= List of people from Kansas =

State flag of Kansas

Location of Kansas in the United States

The following are notable people who were either born, raised, or have lived for a significant period of time in the American state of Kansas.

== Academics and Nobel Prize laureates ==
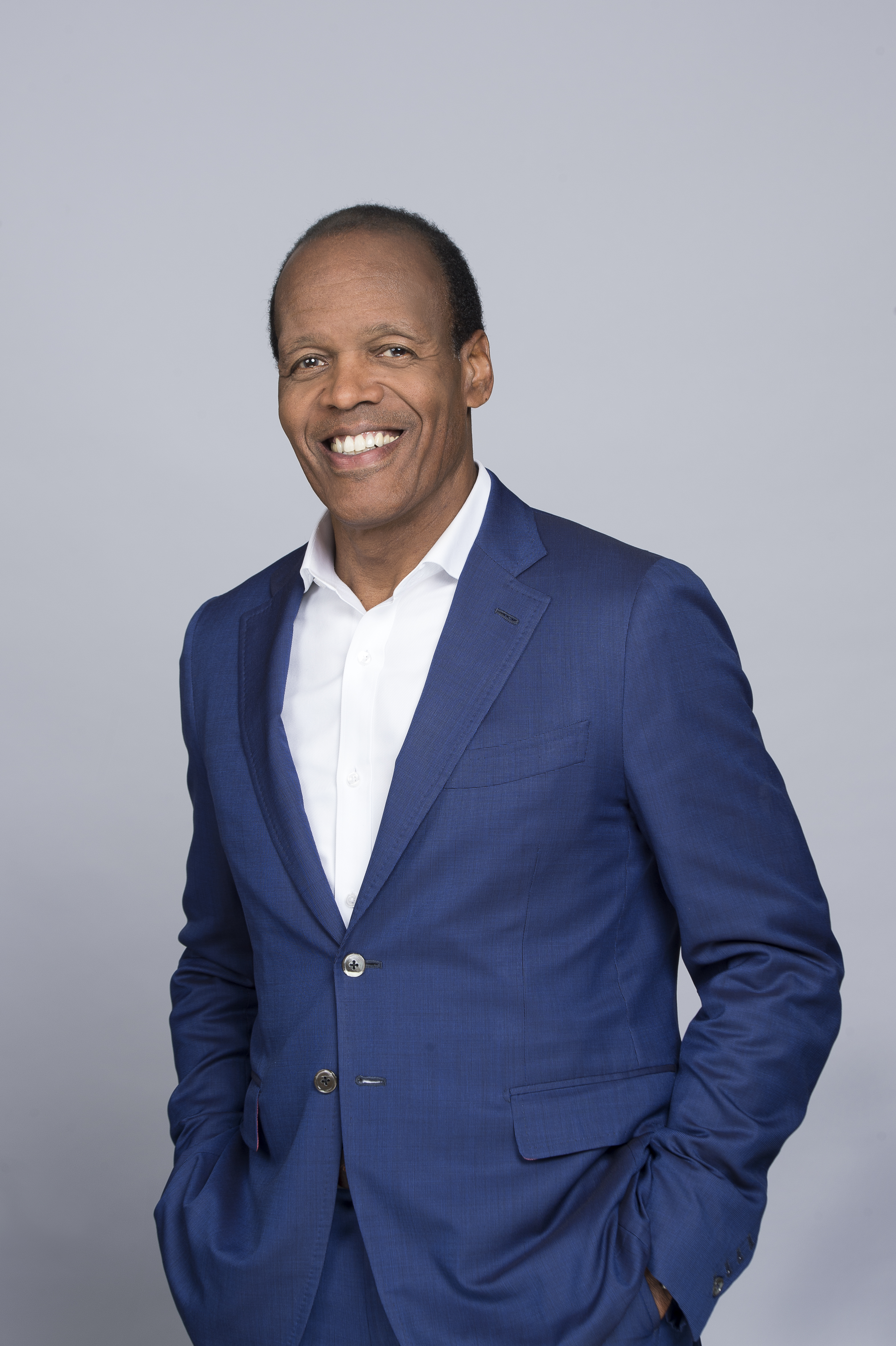
Marvin Lee Pelton

- Milton S. Eisenhower (1899–1985), university president; Abilene
- Wendell Johnson (1906–1965), psychologist and speech pathologist, author of The Monster Study; Roxbury
- Jack S. Kilby (1923–2005), Nobel Prize winner in Physics; Great Bend
- Solon Toothaker Kimball (1909–1982), anthropologist; Manhattan
- Stanford Lehmberg (1931–2012), historian; McPherson
- Norman Malcolm (1911–1990), philosopher; Selden
- Deane Waldo Malott (1898–1996), president of Cornell University; Abilene
- Abby Lillian Marlatt (1869–1943), home economics; Manhattan
- Eric K. Meyer (born 1953), journalism professor and Pulitzer Prize nominee; Marion
- M. Lee Pelton (born 1950), president of Willamette University; Wichita
- John Brooks Slaughter (1934–2023), college president and first African-American director of the National Science Foundation; Topeka
- Vernon L. Smith (born 1927), Nobel Memorial Prize winner in Economics; Wichita
- Earl Wilbur Sutherland Jr. (1915–1974), 1971 Nobel Prize winner in Physiology and Medicine; Burlingame
- Donald Worster (born 1941), historian; Lawrence

== Arts and literature ==
=== Artists ===
- Nina E. Allender (1873–1957), artist and women's suffrage cartoonist; Auburn
- Grace Bilger (1907–2000), artist; Olathe
- Grant Bond (born 1974), artist; Kansas City
- Blackbear Bosin (1921–1980), Native American artist; Wichita
- Gwendolyn Elizabeth Brooks (1917–2000), poet; Topeka
- Bruce Conner (1933–2008), artist; McPherson
- John Steuart Curry (1897–1946), artist; Winchester
- Aaron Douglas (1900–1979), artist; Topeka
- Randall Duell (1903–1992), architect and art director; Russell County
- Edgar Heap of Birds (born 1954), artist; Wichita
- Bruce Helander (born 1947), artist; Great Bend
- Elizabeth Layton (1909–1993), artist; Wellsville
- Evan Lindquist (born 1936), printmaker, Artist Laureate of Arkansas; Salina
- Barbara Morgan (1900–1992), photographer; Buffalo, Kansas
- Gordon Parks (1912–2006), photographer and film director; Fort Scott
- Birger Sandzen (1871–1954), artist, art professor at Bethany College; Lindsborg
- Gary Mark Smith (born 1956), photographer, studied at University of Kansas; Wichita
- W. Eugene Smith (1918–1978), photographer; Wichita
- Mort Walker (1923–2018), cartoonist, creator of Beetle Bailey and Hi and Lois comic strips; El Dorado

=== Authors ===
- Laura Abbot, author of Harlequin romance novels; Kansas City
- Elizabeth Barr Arthur (1884–1971), poet, author, journalist, librarian, police officer, suffragist; Lincoln County
- Gwendolyn Brooks (1917–2000), author, poet; Topeka
- William Burroughs (1914–1997), author; Lawrence
- Don Coldsmith (1926–2009), author of Western fiction; Iola
- Dorothy Canfield Fisher (1879–1958), author of children's books; Lawrence
- Thomas Frank (born 1965), author and editor; Mission Hills
- Clara H. Hazelrigg (1861–1937), author, educator, social reformer; Council Grove
- Jane Heap (1883–1964), author and publisher; Topeka
- Scott Heim (born 1966), author; Hutchinson
- Langston Hughes (1902–1967), author and poet; Lawrence
- William Inge (1913–1973), playwright; Independence
- Bill James (born 1949), author; Mayetta
- Bill Martin Jr. (1916–2004), children's author; Hiawatha
- Fred Myton (1885–1955), screenwriter; Garden City
- Gwendolen Overton (1874/76–1958), novelist; short story writer
- Kathy Patrick, author, founder of Pulpwood Queens Book Club; Eureka
- Scott Phillips (born 1961), author; Wichita
- Vance Randolph (1892–1980), folklorist; Pittsburg
- Red Reeder (1902–1998), author and United States Army officer; Fort Leavenworth
- Richard Rhodes (born 1937), author and historian; Kansas City
- Lois Ruby, author of historic fiction; Lawrence
- Damon Runyon (1880–1946), author; Manhattan
- Mary Francis Shura (1923–1990), children's, romance and mystery author; Pratt
- William Stafford (1914–1993), poet and pacifist; Hutchinson
- Max Yoho (1934–2017), author; Colony

=== Dancers ===
- Clark Tippet (1954–1992), ballet; Parsons

=== Musicians ===
- Chris Arpad, solo steel pannist; McPherson
- Karrin Allyson, jazz performer; Great Bend
- Dawayne Bailey, musician and songwriter (Bob Seger and Chicago); Manhattan
- Pattie Brooks, singer
- Karla Burns (1955–2021), mezzo-soprano; Wichita
- Danny Carey (born 1961), musician; Lawrence
- Richard Christy, musician, actor, comedian, drummer, writer for Howard Stern show; Fort Scott
- Gene Clark (1944–1991), singer-songwriter and founding member of the folk rock band the Byrds; Bonner Springs
- Buck Clayton (1911–1991), jazz trumpeter-arranger solo and with Count Basie, Benny Goodman, Billie Holiday, others; Parsons
- Dorothy DeLay (1917–2002), violinist, Juilliard professor; Medicine Lodge
- Joyce DiDonato (born 1969), mezzo-soprano; Prairie Village
- Phil Ehart (born 1951), drummer for the rock band Kansas; Coffeyville
- Melissa Etheridge (born 1961), musician; Leavenworth
- Rory Lee Feek (born ca. 1966), country music singer; Atchison
- Wendell Hall (1886–1969), musician; St. George
- Mark Hart (born 1953), musician, Crowded House, Supertramp; Fort Scott
- Nora Holt (1885 or 1890–1975), singer and co-founder of the National Association of Negro Musicians; Kansas City
- Dave Hope (born 1949), musician; Topeka
- Eva Jessye (1895–1992), choral conductor; Coffeyville
- Jennifer Knapp (born 1974), singer and songwriter; Chanute
- Brian Leeds (born 1991), a.k.a. Huerco S. and Pendant, electronic musician; Emporia.
- Katrina Leskanich (born 1960), musician; Topeka
- Kerry Livgren (born 1949), founding member of Kansas; Topeka
- Frank Luther (1905–1980), musician; Lakin
- Mitch Markovich (born 1944), drummer, marching band director, professor; Great Bend
- Martina McBride (born 1966), musician; Sharon
- Andy McKee (born 1979), musician; Topeka
- Janelle Monáe (born 1985), vocalist; Kansas City
- Moondog (1916–1999), vocalist, percussionist and composer; real name Louis Thomas Hardin; Marysville
- Jerrod Niemann (born 1979), country singer; Liberal
- Charlie Parker (1920–1955), musician; Kansas City
- Samuel Ramey (born 1942), opera, bass-baritone; Colby
- Joe Don Rooney (born 1975), guitarist and vocalist; Baxter Springs
- Mark Schultz (born 1970), musician; Colby
- Robby Steinhardt (1950–2021), musician; Lawrence
- Steven Stucky (1949–2016), Pulitzer Prize-winner in music; Hutchinson
- Jeremy Turner, guitar player in death metal band Origin, formerly of Cannibal Corpse
- Grace VanderWaal (born 2004), singer-songwriter, ukuleleist, winner of America's Got Talent season 11 (born in Lenexa)
- Joe Walsh (born 1947), musician; Wichita
- Bobby Watson (born 1953), musician; Bonner Springs
- James Wesley, country music singer; Mound Valley
- David Wetzel (born 1983), musician; Westwood
- J. White Did It (born 1984), record producer; Kansas City and Leavenworth
- Rich Williams (born 1950), musician; Topeka
- Chely Wright (born 1970), musician; Wellsville
- XV (stage name of Donavan LaMond Johnson), emcee, producer; Wichita
- Gordon Young (1919–1998), organist and composer; McPherson

== Athletics ==
=== Athletes ===
A–F

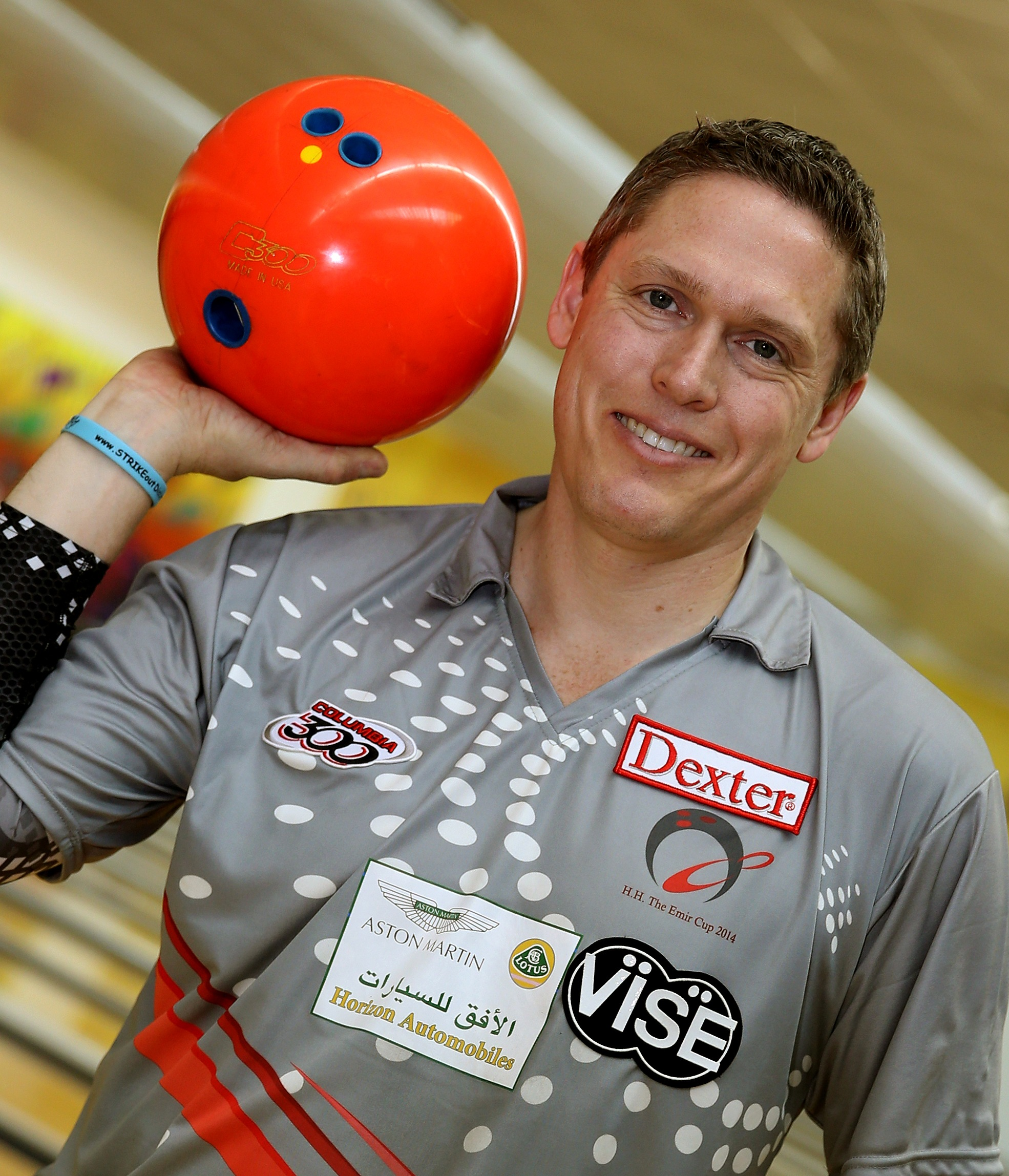
Chris Barnes

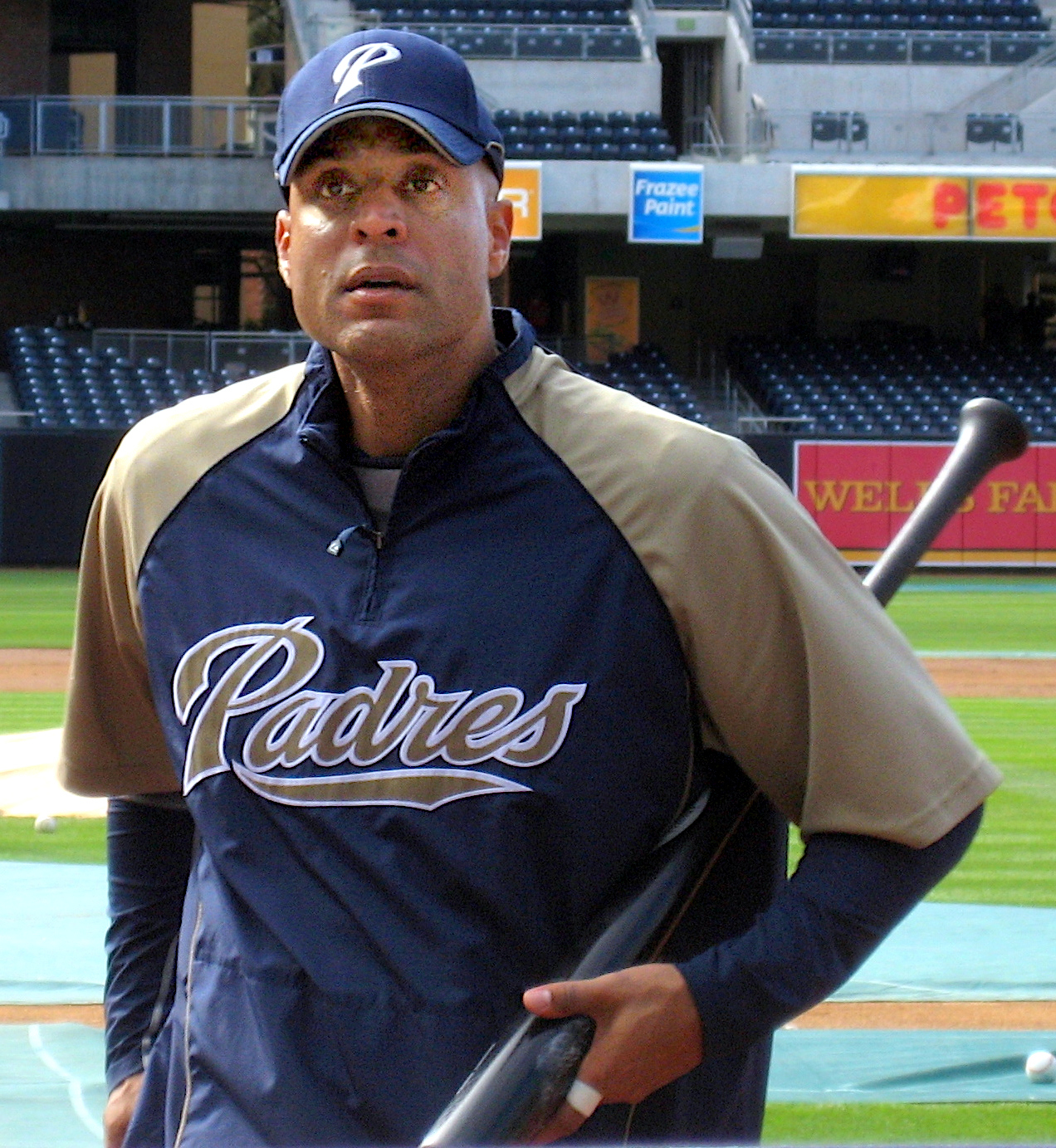
Tony Clark

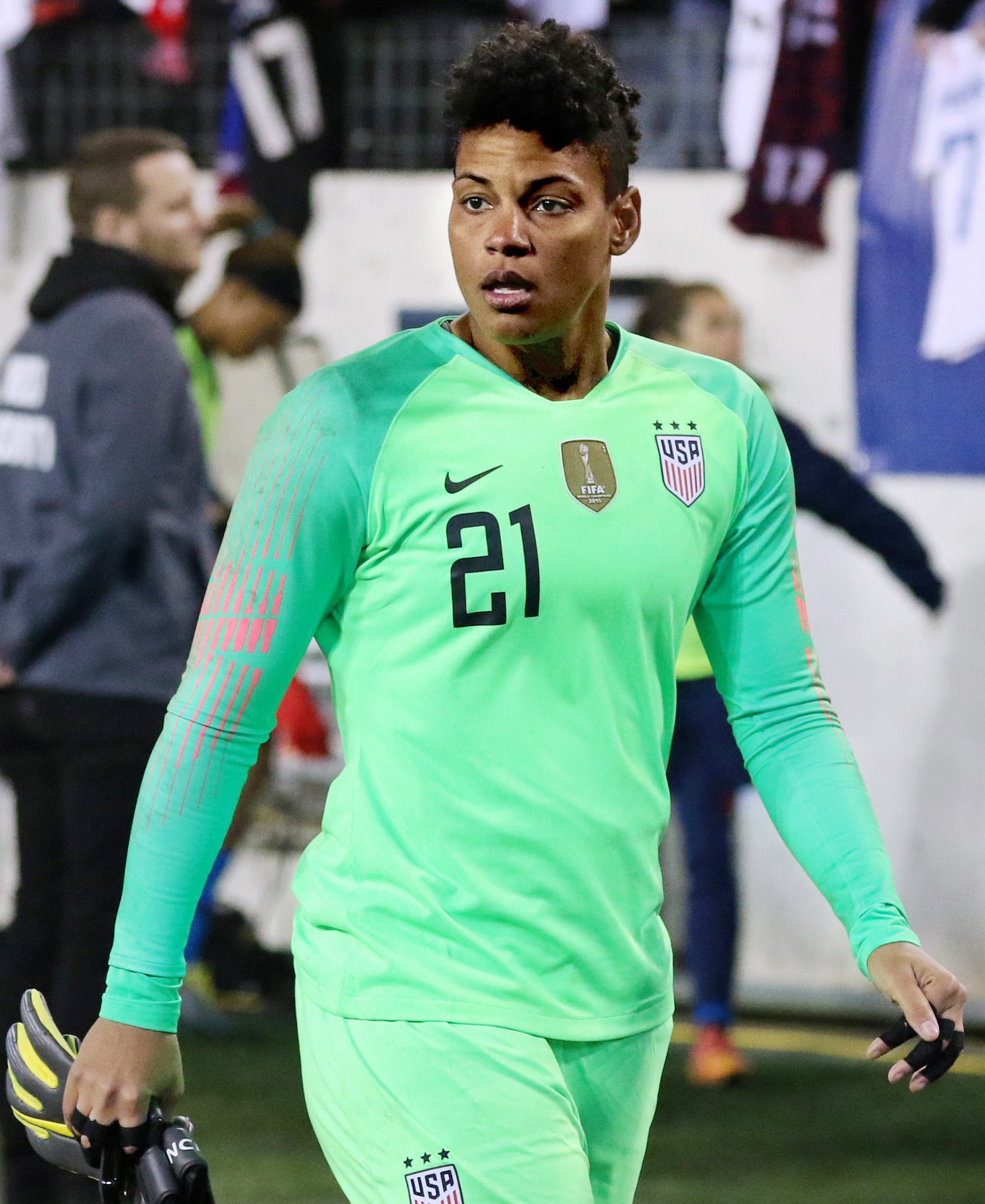
Adrianna Franch

- Alvan Adams (born 1954), basketball; Lawrence
- John H. Adams (1914–1995), jockey; Iola
- Neil Allen (born 1958), baseball pitcher, pitching coach; Kansas City
- David Arkin (born 1987), pro football player; Wichita
- Elden Auker (1910–2006), baseball pitcher; Norcatur
- Chase Austin (born 1989), NASCAR driver; Eudora
- Chris Babb (born 1990), basketball player in the Israeli Basketball Premier League; Topeka
- Ron Baker (born 1993), NBA player (New York Knicks); Utica and Scott City (born in Hays)
- Thane Baker (born 1931), gold medalist at 1956 Summer Olympics, decathlon; Elkhart
- Tony Barker (born 1968), football player; Wichita
- Chris Barnes (born 1970), professional bowler; Topeka
- James Bausch (1906–1974), gold medalist 1932 Summer Olympics; Garden Plain
- Oliver Bradwell (born 1992), sprinter; Wichita
- Judy Bell (born 1936), member of World Golf Hall of Fame; Wichita
- Matt Besler (born 1987), professional soccer player; Overland Park
- B.H. Born (1932–2013), basketball player; Medicine Lodge
- Clint Bowyer (born 1979), NASCAR driver; Emporia
- George Brett (born 1953), baseball Hall of Famer; Mission Hills
- Bryce Brown (born 1991), football player; Wichita
- Orville Brown (1908–1981), pro wrestler, NWA champion; Sharon
- Mildred Bliss Burke (1915–1989), pro wrestler, Professional Wrestling Hall of Fame; Coffeyville
- Enos Cabell (born 1949), baseball player; Fort Riley
- Veronica Campbell-Brown (born 1982), track and field athlete (Olympic and world champion); Great Bend
- Antoine Carr (born 1961), basketball player
- Willie Cauley-Stein (born 1993), professional basketball player Spearville
- Larry Cheney (1886–1969), baseball pitcher; Belleville
- Jack Christiansen (1928–1986), football Hall of Famer; Sublette
- Tony Clark (born 1972), baseball player; Newton
- Maliek Collins (born 1995), football player; Kansas City
- Baron Corbin (born 1984), football player, WWE wrestler; Lenexa
- Nolan Cromwell (born 1955), football player; Smith Center
- Aaron Crow (born 1986), baseball player; Topeka
- Glenn Cunningham (1909–1988), silver medalist, 1936 Olympic Games,1,500m run; Elkhart
- Johnny Damon (born 1973), baseball player; Fort Riley
- Eldon Danenhauer (1935–2021), football player; Clay Center
- Darren Daulton (born 1962), baseball player; Arkansas City
- Wantha Davis (1917–2012), jockey; Liberal
- Joey Devine (born 1983), baseball player; Junction City
- Lynn Dickey (born 1949), football player; Osawatomie
- Andy Dirks (born 1986), baseball player; Burrton
- Larry Drew (born 1958), basketball player and coach; Kansas City
- Mark Duckens (born 1965), football player; Wichita
- Brian Duensing (born 1983), baseball player; Marysville
- Brody Eldridge (born 1987), football player; La Cygne
- Tim Elliott (born 1986), mixed martial artist; Wichita
- Maurice Evans (born 1978), basketball player; Wichita
- Kyle Farnsworth (born 1976), baseball player; Wichita
- Galen Fiss (1931–2006), football player; Johnson City
- Adrianna Franch (born 1990), soccer player (world champion); Salina
- Scott Fulhage (born 1961), football player; Beloit

G–M

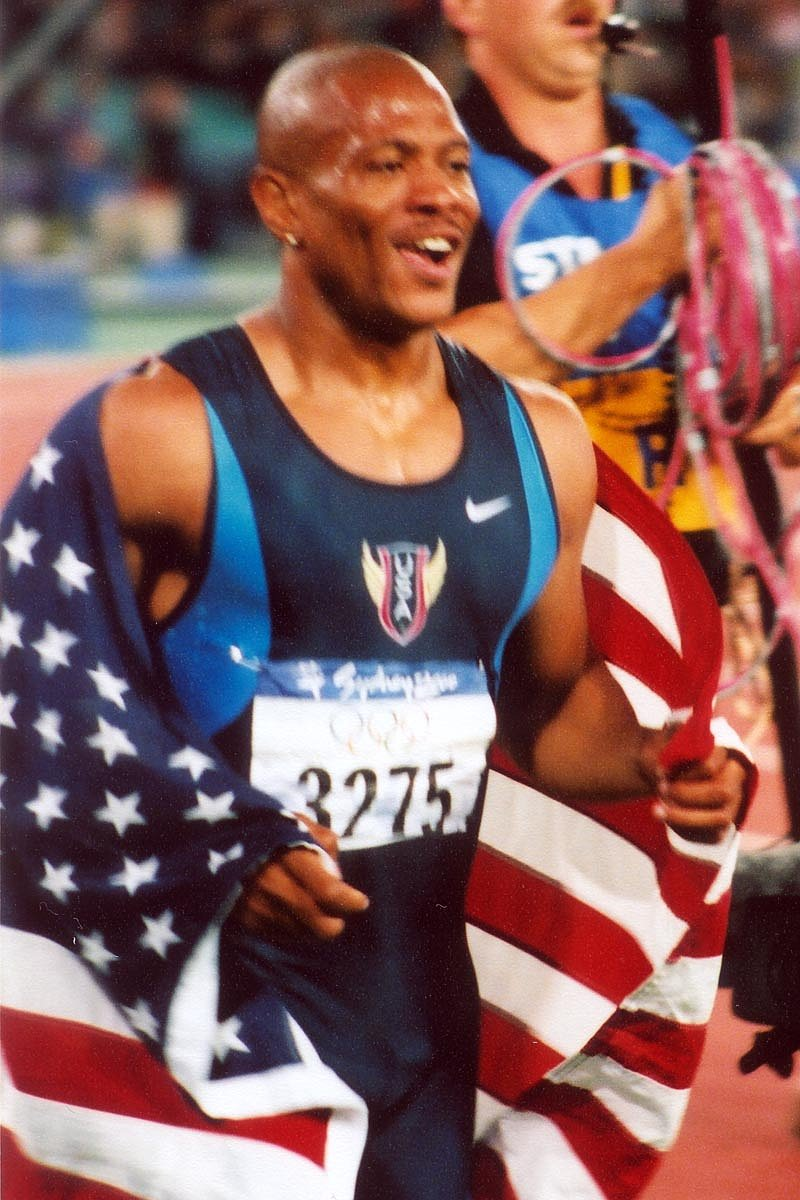
Maurice Greene

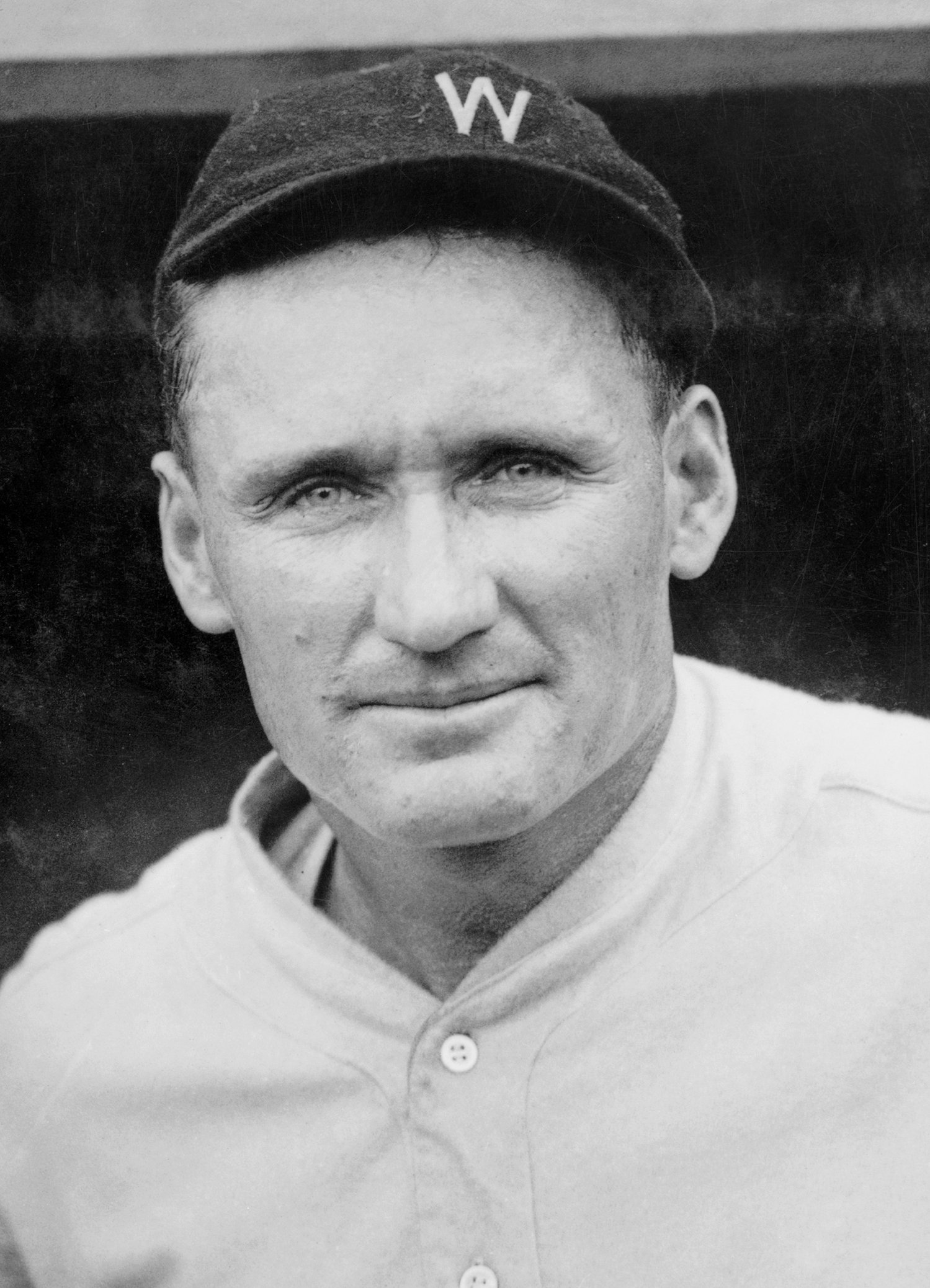
Walter Johnson

- Andrew Gachkar (born 1988), football player; Overland Park
- Kendall Gammon (born 1968), football player; Rose Hill
- Tyson Gay (born 1982), track and field athlete (world champion); Great Bend
- Maurice Greene (born 1974), track and field athlete (world and Olympic champion); Kansas City
- Adrian Griffin (born 1974), basketball player and coach; Wichita
- Geneo Grissom (born 1992), football player; Hutchinson
- Andy Gruenebaum (born 1982), soccer player
- Don Gutteridge (1912–2008), baseball player and manager; Pittsburg
- Joe Hastings (born 1987), football player; Wichita
- Tanner Hawkinson (born 1990), football player; McPherson
- Mark Haynes (born 1958), football player; Kansas City
- Ben Heeney (born 1992), football player; Hutchinson
- Bobby Henrich (born 1938), baseball player; Lawrence
- Don Hill (1904–1967), football player; Hiawatha
- Shaun Hill (born 1980), football player; Parsons
- Elon Hogsett (1903–2001), baseball player; Brownell
- Lionel Hollins (born 1953), basketball player and coach; Arkansas City
- Scott Huffman (born 1964), pole vaulter; Quinter
- Damian Johnson (born 1962), football player; Great Bend
- Walter Johnson (1887–1946), baseball Hall of Famer; Humboldt
- Pete Kilduff (1893–1930), baseball player; Weir
- Fred Kipp (born 1931), baseball pitcher; Piqua
- Tonya Knight (born 1966), IFBB professional bodybuilder; Overland Park
- Laurie Koehn (born 1982), WNBA player; Moundridge
- Gene Krug (born 1955), baseball player; Garden City
- Adam LaRoche (born 1979), baseball player; Fort Scott
- Bobby Lashley (born 1976), professional wrestler for WWE; Junction City
- Shalee Lehning (born 1987), WNBA player; Sublette
- Martin Lewis (born 1975), NBA basketball player; Liberal
- Danny Manning (born 1966), NBA basketball player; Lawrence
- Harold Manning (1909–2003), Steeplechase world record holder and Olympian; Sedgwick
- Rudy May (born 1944), baseball player; Coffeyville
- Jon McGraw, professional football player; Riley
- Archie "Hap" McKain (1911–1985), baseball player; Delphos
- Peter Mehringer (1910–1987), Olympic gold medalist wrestler, pro football player; Kinsley
- Brian Moorman (born 1976), football player; Sedgwick
- Mike Morin (born 1991), baseball player; Leawood

N–Z

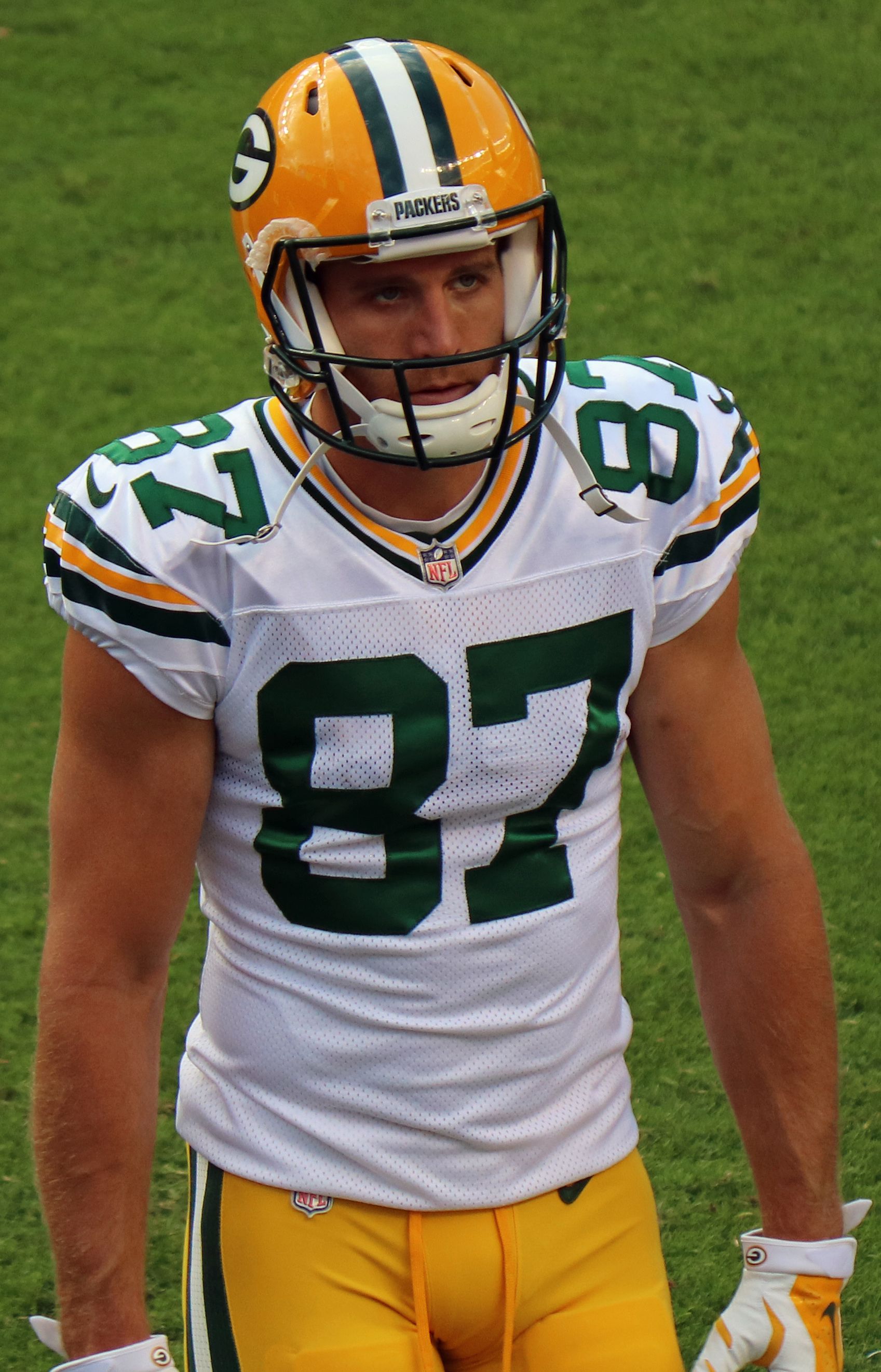
Jordy Nelson

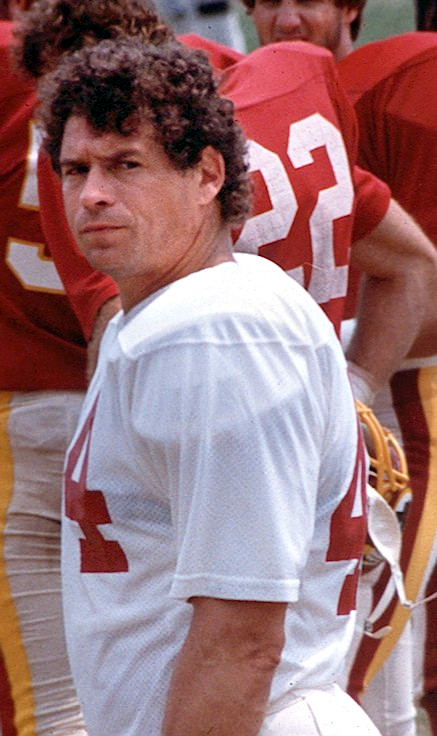
John Riggins

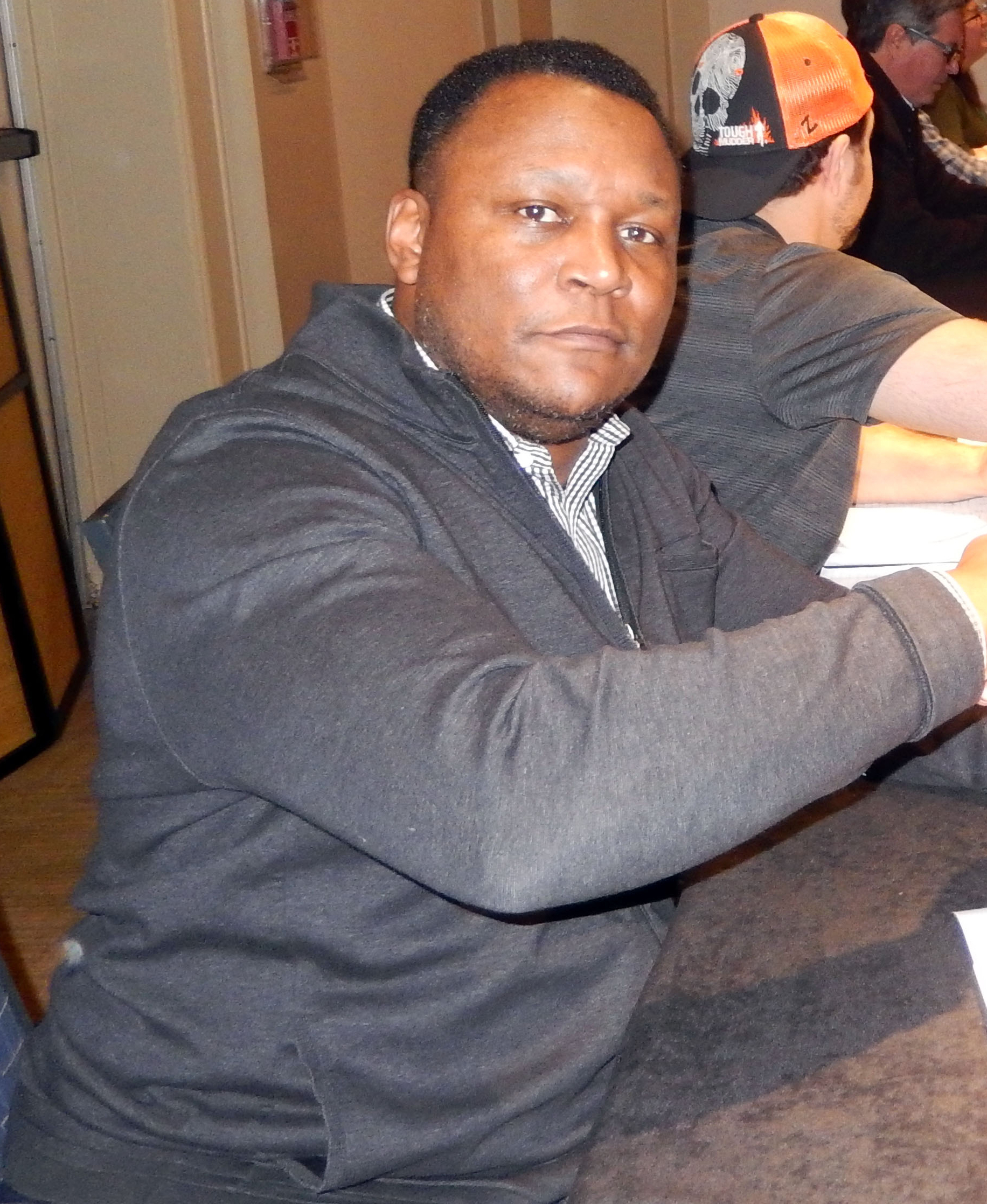
Barry Sanders

- Marcio Navarro (born 1978), professional kickboxer and mixed martial artist; Wichita
- Jordy Nelson (born 1985), football player; Leonardville
- Terence Newman (born 1978), football player; Salina
- Nicole Ohlde (born 1982), WNBA player; Clay Center
- Antonio Orozco (born 1987), professional boxer; Garden City
- Victor Ortiz (born 1987), professional boxer; Garden City
- Bob Orton (1929–2006), professional wrestler; Kansas City
- Bob Orton Jr. (born 1950), professional wrestler, WWE Hall of Fame; Kansas City
- John Parrella (born 1969), professional football player; Topeka
- Hal Patterson (1932–2011), professional football player; Larned
- Jordan Phillips (born 1992), professional football player; Towanda
- Joseph Randle (born 1991), professional football player; Wichita
- Ronn Reynolds (born 1958), professional baseball player; Wichita
- Dustin Richardson (born 1984), MLB pitcher; Newton
- John Riggins (born 1949), football player, Pro Football Hall of Famer; Centralia
- Brandon Rios (born 1986), professional boxer; Garden City
- Lafayette Russell (1905–1978), football player, B-movie actor "Reb" Russell; Osawatomie
- Johnny Rutherford (born 1938), race car driver; Coffeyville
- Jim Ryun (born 1947), athlete and politician; Wichita
- Barry Sanders (born 1968), football player, NFL Hall of Famer; Wichita
- Melvin Sanders (born 1981), pro basketball player; Liberal
- Wes Santee (1932–2010), NCAA cross country champion, track and field athlete; Ashland
- Gale Sayers (1943–2020), NFL Hall of Famer; Wichita
- Otto Schnellbacher (1923–2008), pro basketball and football player; Sublette
- Ryan Schraeder (born 1988), professional football player; Wichita
- Grant Sherfield (born 1999), basketball player in the Israeli Basketball Premier League
- Wayne Simien (born 1983), NCAA All-American, NBA basketball player; Leavenworth
- Mark Simoneau (born 1977), professional football player; Smith Center
- Marilynn Smith (1929–2019), professional golfer and LPGA co-founder; Topeka
- Darren Sproles (born 1983), professional football player; Olathe
- Bubba Starling (born 1992), professional baseball player; Gardner
- Lee Stevens (born 1967), professional baseball player; Lawrence
- Jackie Stiles (born 1978), WNBA basketball player; Claflin
- Stewart "Smokey" Stover (born 1938), professional football player; McPherson
- Darrell Stuckey (born 1987), professional football player; Kansas City
- Tom Sturdivant (1930–2009), professional baseball player; Gordon
- Steve Tasker (born 1962), NFL Pro Bowl MVP in 1993; Leoti (born in Smith Center
- Luther Haden "Dummy" Taylor (1875–1958), baseball pitcher; Oskaloosa
- Doug Terry (born 1968), pro football player; Liberal
- Tommy Thompson (1916–1989), pro football player; Hutchinson
- Joe Tinker (1880–1948), MLB shortstop, member of Baseball Hall of Fame; Muscotah
- Blake Treinen (born 1988), professional baseball player; Osage City
- Jerame Tuman (born 1976), pro football player; Liberal
- Ron Warner (born 1975), professional football player; Independence
- Earl Watson (born 1979), NBA basketball player; Kansas City
- Tom Watson (born 1949), golfer, member of World Golf Hall of Fame; Stilwell
- Mitch Webster (born 1959), MLB player; Larned
- Kendra Wecker (born 1982), WNBA player; Marysville
- Michael Wilhoite (born 1986), pro football player; Manhattan
- Jess Willard (1881–1968), world heavyweight boxing champion, St. Clere; Pottawatomie County
- Kamerion Wimbley (born 1983), professional football player; Wichita
- Lynette Woodard (born 1959), basketball Hall of Famer; Wichita
- Brad Ziegler (born 1979), baseball player; Pratt
- John Zook (1947–2020), professional football player; Garden City

=== Coaches ===
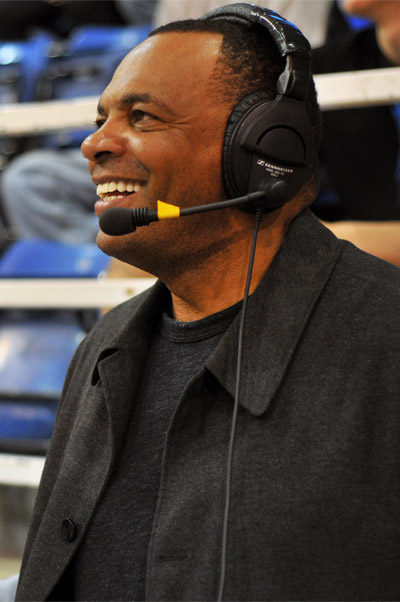
Lionel Hollins

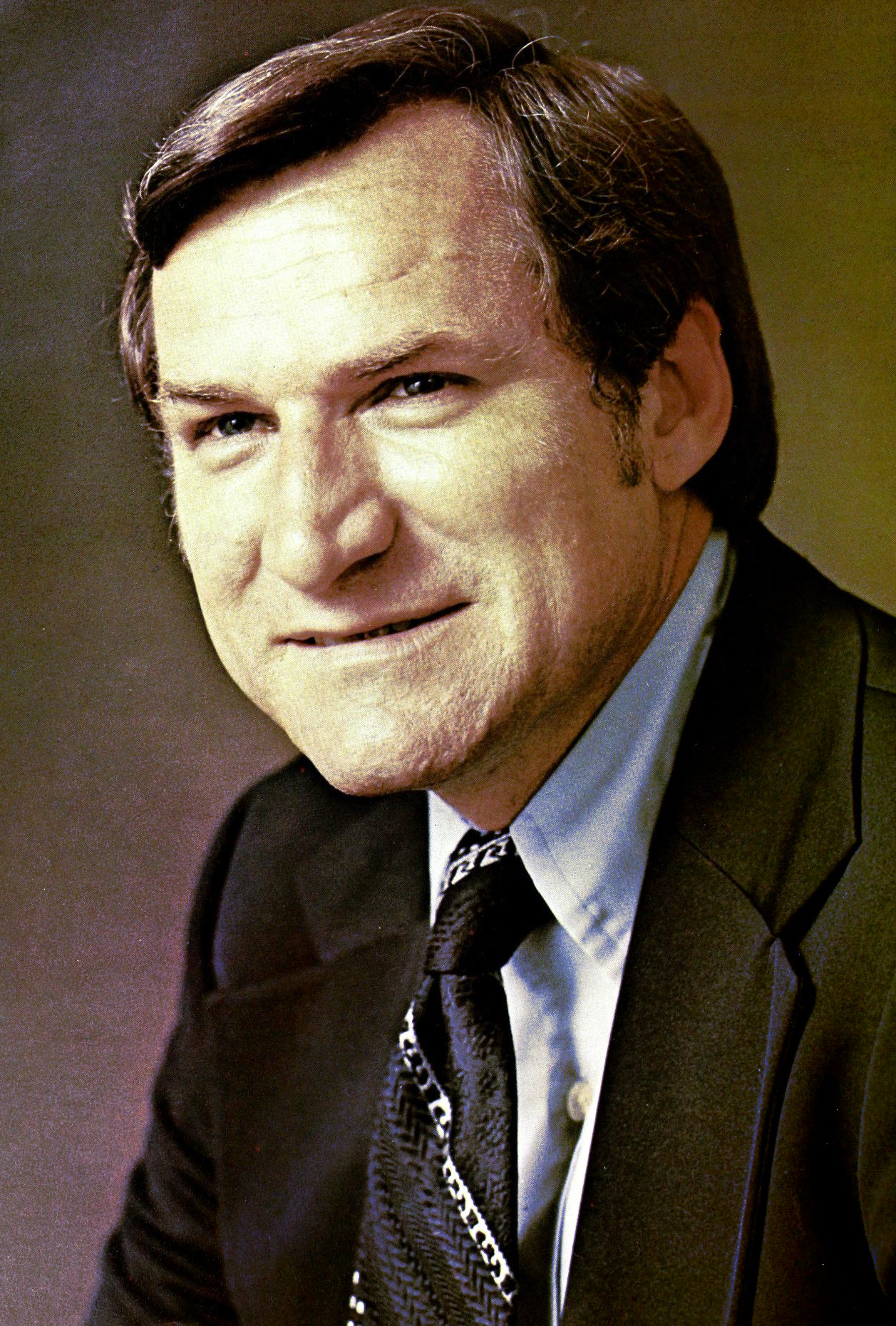
Dean Smith

- Phog Allen (1885–1974), Hall of Fame college basketball coach; Lawrence
- Jeremy Bates (born 1976), NFL offensive coordinator; Manhattan
- Jack Christiansen (1928–1986), pro and college football coach; Sublette
- Alan Cockrell (born 1962), hitting coach, New York Yankees; Kansas City
- Jory Collins (born 1978), college basketball coach; Holton
- Larry Drew (born 1958), NBA head coach; Kansas City
- Mark Fox (born 1969), college basketball coach; Garden City
- Dennis Franchione (born 1951), college football coach; Girard
- Edward C. Gallagher (1887–1940), NCAA Champion, Olympic and Hall of Fame Wrestling Coach; Perth
- Don Gambril (born 1934), Hall of Fame swimming coach; Altamont
- Ted Gilmore (born 1967), college football coach; Wichita
- Bill Guthridge (1937–2015), college basketball coach; Parsons
- Lionel Hollins (born 1953), NBA head coach; Arkansas City
- Ralph Houk (1919–2010), Major League Baseball manager; Lawrence
- Tim Jankovich (born 1959), college basketball coach; Manhattan
- Gene Keady (born 1936), Hall of Fame college basketball coach; Larned
- Gary Patterson (born 1960), college football coach; Rozel
- Jerry Kill (born 1961), college football coach; Cheney
- Lon Kruger (born 1952), college and NBA basketball coach; Silver Lake
- John McLendon (1915–1999), Hall of Fame basketball coach of college, ABL, and ABA; Hiawatha
- Ralph Miller (1919–2001), Hall of Fame college basketball coach; Chanute
- Billie Moore (born 1943), Hall of Fame college basketball coach; Westmoreland
- James Naismith (1861–1939), inventor of basketball, coach, athletic director, faculty member at University of Kansas
- Johnny Orr (1927–2013), college basketball coach; Yale
- John H. Outland (1871–1947), namesake of Outland Trophy; Douglas County
- Adolph Rupp (1901–1977), Hall of Fame college basketball coach; Halstead
- Francis Schmidt (1885–1944), college football, baseball, and basketball coach; Downs
- Brian Schottenheimer (born 1973), NFL offensive coordinator; Stilwell
- Dean Smith (1931–2015), Hall of Fame college basketball coach; Emporia
- Bill Snyder (born 1939), Hall of Fame college football coach; Kansas State University
- Eddie Sutton (1936–2020), college basketball coach; Bucklin
- Mark Turgeon (born 1965), college basketball coach; Topeka
- Brent Venables (born 1970), college football coach; Salina

== Aviators and astronauts ==
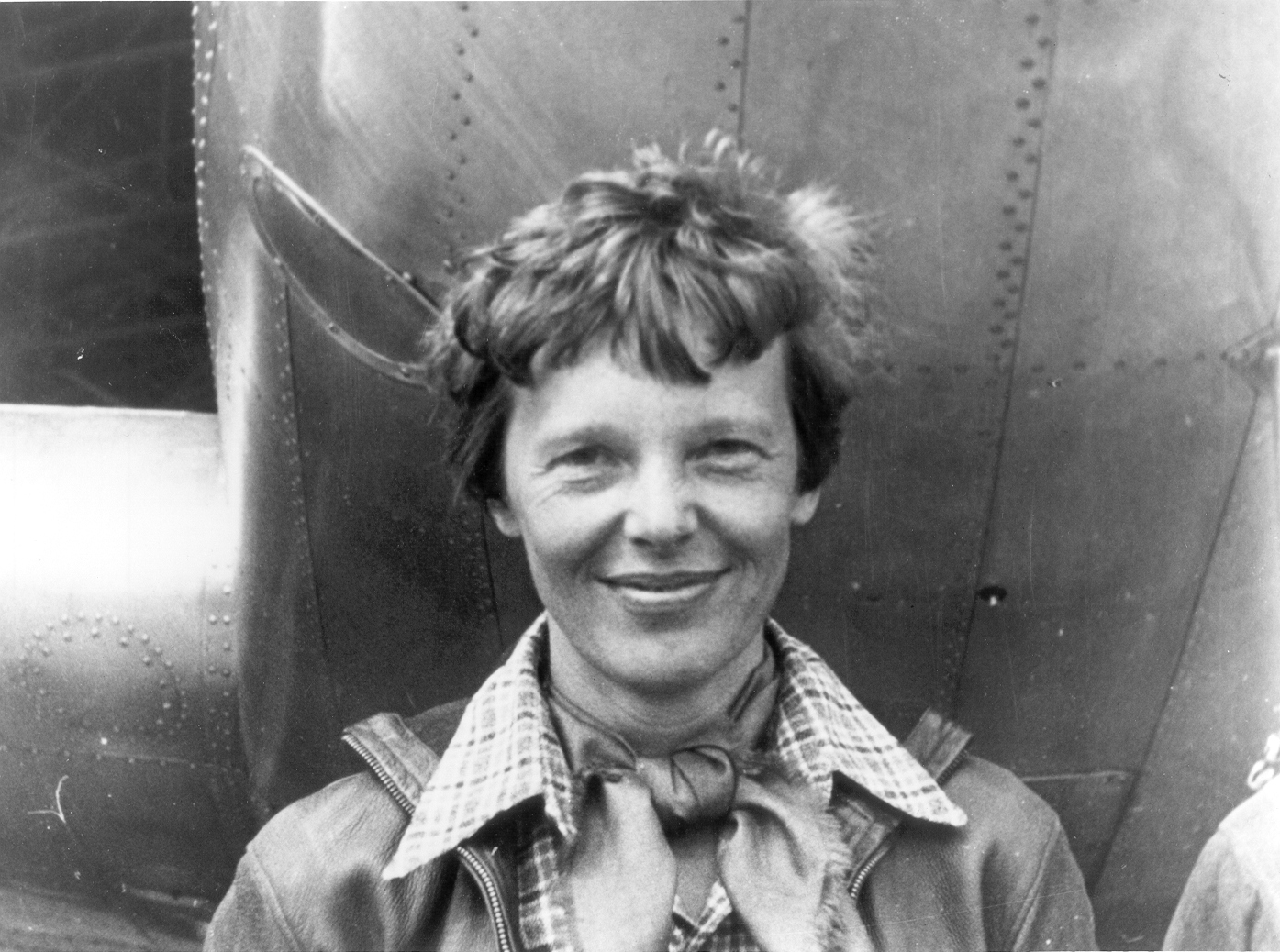
Amelia Earhart

- Walter Herschel Beech (1891–1950), aviator and aircraft designer; Wichita
- Clyde Vernon Cessna (1879–1954), aviator and aircraft designer; Rago
- Amelia Earhart (1897–1937), aviator; Atchison
- Joe Engle (1932–2024), astronaut; Chapman
- Ronald Evans (1933–1990), astronaut; St. Francis
- Daniel Forbes (1920–1948), United States Army Air Corps pilot; Carbondale
- Steve Hawley (born 1951), astronaut; Salina
- Donald Hudson (1895–1967), World War I flying ace; Topeka
- Glenn L. Martin (1886–1955), aviation pioneer; Salina
- Lloyd Carlton Stearman (1898–1975), aviator and aircraft designer; Wellsford

== Businesspeople and inventors ==
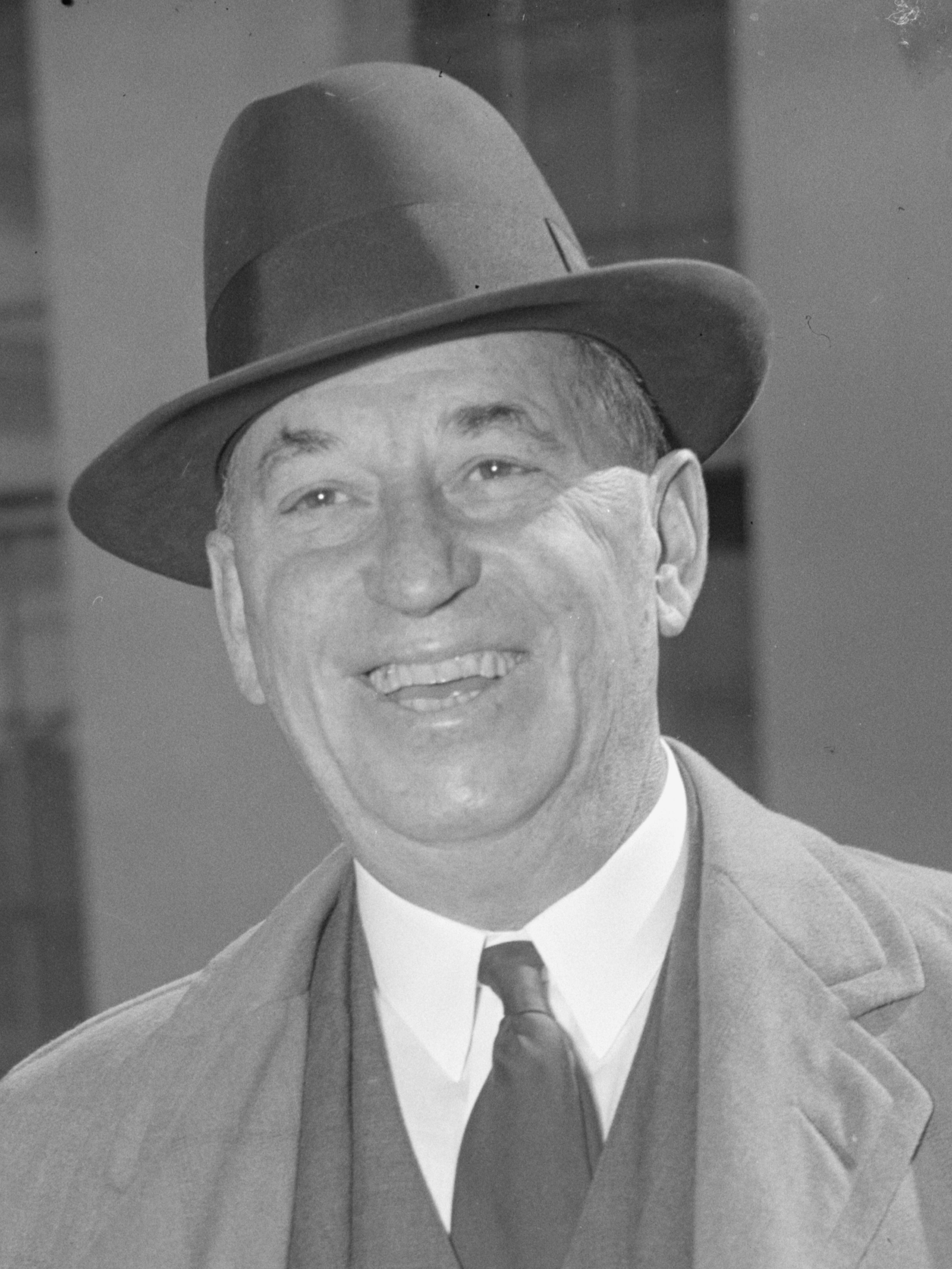
Walter Chrysler

- Philip Anschutz (born 1939), billionaire investor; Russell
- Bion Barnett (1857–1958), co-founder of Barnett Bank; Hiawatha
- Olive Ann Beech, chairwoman of Beech Aircraft Company; Wichita (born in Waverly)
- David G. Booth (born 1946), co-founder of Dimensional Fund; Lawrence, Kansas
- Dan and Frank Carney (Dan born 1931, Frank 1938–2020), founders of Pizza Hut; Wichita
- Walter Chrysler (1875–1940), founder of Chrysler Corporation; Wamego
- William Coffin Coleman (1870–1957), founder of the Coleman Company; Wichita
- David Dillon (born 1951), former CEO of Kroger; Hutchinson
- Vic Edelbrock (1913–1962), automotive engineer; Eudora
- David Green (born 1941), founder of Hobby Lobby; Emporia
- James Harbord (1866–1947), president and chairman of the board of RCA; Manhattan
- Hollis Dow Hedberg (1903–1988), president of Gulf Oil Company; Falun
- William Wadsworth Hodkinson (1881–1971), pioneer film marketer and distributor; Independence
- Carl Ice (born 1956), president of BNSF; Topeka
- Omar Knedlik (1915–1989), inventor of the ICEE frozen drink; Barnes
- Charles G. Koch (born 1935), CEO of Koch Industries; Wichita
- David H. Koch (1940–2019), executive and politician; Wichita
- Alan Mulally (born 1945), engineer, former president and CEO of the Ford Motor Company; Lawrence
- Matthew K. Rose (born 1959), chairman and CEO of Burlington Northern Santa Fe Corp.; Salina
- Harry F. Sinclair (1876–1956), founder of Sinclair Oil Company; Independence
- Russell Stover (1888–1954), founder of Russell Stover Candies; Alton

== Film, stage and television ==
=== Actors and performers ===
- Brandon Adams (born 1979), actor; Topeka
- Tyrees Allen (born 1954), actor; Salina
- Kirstie Alley (1951–2022), actress; Wichita
- Fatty Arbuckle (1887–1933), actor; Smith Center
- Barbara Babcock (born 1937), actress; Fort Riley
- Gerry Bamman (born 1941), actor; Independence
- Hugh Beaumont (1909–1982), actor; Lawrence
- Annette Bening (born 1958), actress; Topeka
- Gregg Binkley (born 1963), actor; Topeka
- Madge Blake (1899–1969), actress (Batman); Kinsley
- Roscoe Born (1950–2020), actor; Topeka
- Steve Brodie (1919–1992), actor; El Dorado
- Louise Brooks (1906–1985), actress; Cherryvale
- Petrea Burchard (born 1955), actress; Lawrence
- Darren E. Burrows (born 1966), actor; Winfield
- Trai Byers (born 1983), actor; Kansas City
- Del Close (1934–1999), actor and comedian; Manhattan
- Brent Collins (1941–1988), actor; Plainville
- Jack Colvin (1934–2005), actor; Lyndon
- Aneta Corsaut (1933–1995), actress; Hutchinson
- Nathan Darrow (born 1976), actor; Overland Park
- Lucinda Dickey (born 1960), actress and dancer; Hutchinson
- Billy Drago (1945–2019), actor; Hugoton
- Marj Dusay (1936–2020), actress; Hays
- Jimmy Donaldson (born 1998), YouTuber; Wichita
- R. Lee Ermey (1944–2018), actor; Emporia
- Bridget Everett (born 1972), actress, cabaret artist, comedian; Manhattan
- Bill Farmer (born 1952), voice actor; Pratt
- Tamara Feldman (born 1980), actress; Wichita
- Scott Foley (born 1972), actor; Kansas City
- Dwight Frye (1899–1943), actor; Salina
- Alan Fudge (1944–2011), actor; Wichita
- Laurel Goodwin (born 1942), actress; Wichita
- Cary Guffey (born 1972), actor; Topeka
- Zach Hadel (born 1990), voice actor; Overland Park
- Dennis Hayden (born 1952), actor; Girard
- Colton Haynes (born 1988), actor; Wichita
- Thelma Hill (1906–1938), actress; Emporia
- Dennis Hopper (1936–2010), actor; Dodge City
- Jayne Houdyshell (born 1953), actress; Topeka
- Mary Howard (1913–2009), actress; Independence
- Don Johnson (born 1949), actor; Wichita
- Neal Jones (born 1960), actor; Wichita
- Gordon Jump (1932–2003), actor; Manhattan
- Tom Kane (born 1962), voice actor; Overland Park
- Buster Keaton (1895–1966), actor and director; Piqua
- Emmett Kelly (1898–1979), circus clown; Sedan
- Laura Kirk (born 1966), actress; Lecompton
- Shirley Knight (1936–2020), actress; Goessel
- Sarah Lancaster (born 1980), actress; Overland Park
- Lila Leeds (1928–1999), actress; Dodge City
- Hattie McDaniel (1895–1952), actress; Wichita
- Everett McGill (born 1945), actor; Kansas City
- Michael McMillian (born 1978), actor; Olathe
- Vera Miles (born 1930), actress; Pratt and Wichita
- George Murdock (1930–2012), actor; Salina
- Cassandra Peterson (born 1951), actress, aka Elvira, Mistress of the Dark; Manhattan
- ZaSu Pitts (1894–1963), actress; Parsons
- Chris Porter (born 1979), comedian; Olathe
- John Quade (1938–2009), actor; Kansas City
- James Reynolds, actor; Oskaloosa
- Rob Riggle (born 1970), actor and comedian; Overland Park
- Charles "Buddy" Rogers (1904–1991), actor and jazz musician; Olathe
- Paul Rudd (born 1969), actor; Overland Park
- Sheila Ryan (1921–1975), actress; Topeka
- Kendall Schmidt (born 1990), singer, actor, and dancer; Wichita
- Kevin Schmidt (born 1988), actor; Andover
- Travis Schuldt (born 1974), actor; Topeka
- Angus Scrimm (1926–2016), actor; Kansas City
- Max Showalter (1917–2000), actor; Caldwell
- Cynthia Sikes (born 1954), actress; Coffeyville
- Lois Smith (born 1930), actress; Topeka
- David Rees Snell (born 1966), actor; Wichita
- Sara Sothern (1895–1994), stage actress; Arkansas City
- Taryn Southern (born 1986), actress, YouTube personality; Wichita
- Rebecca Staab (born 1961), actress; Hays
- Michael Stevens (born 1986), educator, entertainer; Stilwell
- Milburn Stone (1904–1980), actor (Gunsmoke); Burrton
- Eric Stonestreet (born 1971), actor; Kansas City
- Jason Sudeikis (born 1975), actor; Overland Park
- Norma Terris (1904–1989), actress; Columbus
- Fay Tincher (1884–1983), actress; Topeka
- Vivian Vance (1909–1979), actress (I Love Lucy); Cherryvale
- Matt Vogel (born 1970), puppeteer; Kansas City
- Lyle Waggoner (1935–2020), sculptor, actor (Wonder Woman); Kansas City
- Kari Wahlgren (born 1977), actress; Hoisington
- Dee Wallace (born 1948), actress; Kansas City
- Jason Wiles (born 1970), actor; Lenexa
- Claire Windsor (1892–1972), actress; Cawker City
- Patrice Wymore (1926–2014), actress; Miltonvale
- Jeff Yagher (born 1961), actor; Lawrence

=== Directors ===
- Michael Almereyda (born 1960), film director; Overland Park
- Steve Balderson (born 1975), film director; Wamego
- Darren Lynn Bousman (born 1979), film director; Overland Park
- Chris Buck (born 1960), film director, animator; Wichita
- Eric Darnell (born 1960), director, writer, songwriter, animator; Prairie Village
- Randall Duell (1903–1992), art director; Russell County
- Alex Graves (born 1968), television director; El Dorado
- Sherman Halsey, music video and television director; Independence
- Martin and Osa Johnson (1884–1937 and 1894–1953), film pioneer, explorer; Chanute
- Stephen R. Johnson (1952 - 2015), music video and television director; Paola
- Oscar Micheaux (1893–1951), film director; Great Bend
- Gordon Parks (1912–2006), film director; Fort Scott
- Richard Thorpe (1896–1991), film director; Hutchinson
- Kevin Willmott (born, 1959), film director and screenwriter; Junction City

== Public figures ==
=== Journalists ===
- Frank Marshall Davis (1905–1987), journalist, poet, political and labor movement activist; Arkansas City
- Steve Doocy (born 1956), co-host of Fox News's Fox & Friends; Abilene
- Elizabeth Farnsworth (born 1943), television journalist; Topeka
- William M. Gallagher (1923–1975), Pulitzer Prize-winning photojournalist; Hiawatha
- Jane Grant (1892–1972), journalist who co-founded The New Yorker; Girard
- E. W. Howe (1853–1937), author and newspaper editor; Atchison
- Bill Kurtis (born 1940), television journalist; Independence
- Jim Lehrer (1934–2020), television journalist; Wichita
- Melissa McDermott (born 1960s), television news anchor for CBS's Up to the Minute; Wichita
- Clementine Paddleford (1898–1967), journalist and food critic; Riley County
- Eugene C. Pulliam (1889–1975), founder of Central Newspapers, Inc.; Ulysses
- Roy A. Roberts (1887–1967), newspaper editor; Muscotah
- W. Eugene Smith (1918–1978), photojournalist; Wichita
- John Cameron Swayze (1906–1995), television journalist; Wichita
- Julius Wayland (1854–1912), newspaper editor, Appeal to Reason; Girard
- William Allen White (1868–1944), author and newspaper editor; Emporia
- Gene Wojciechowski, author, sportswriter and ESPN commentator; Salina

=== Politics and law ===
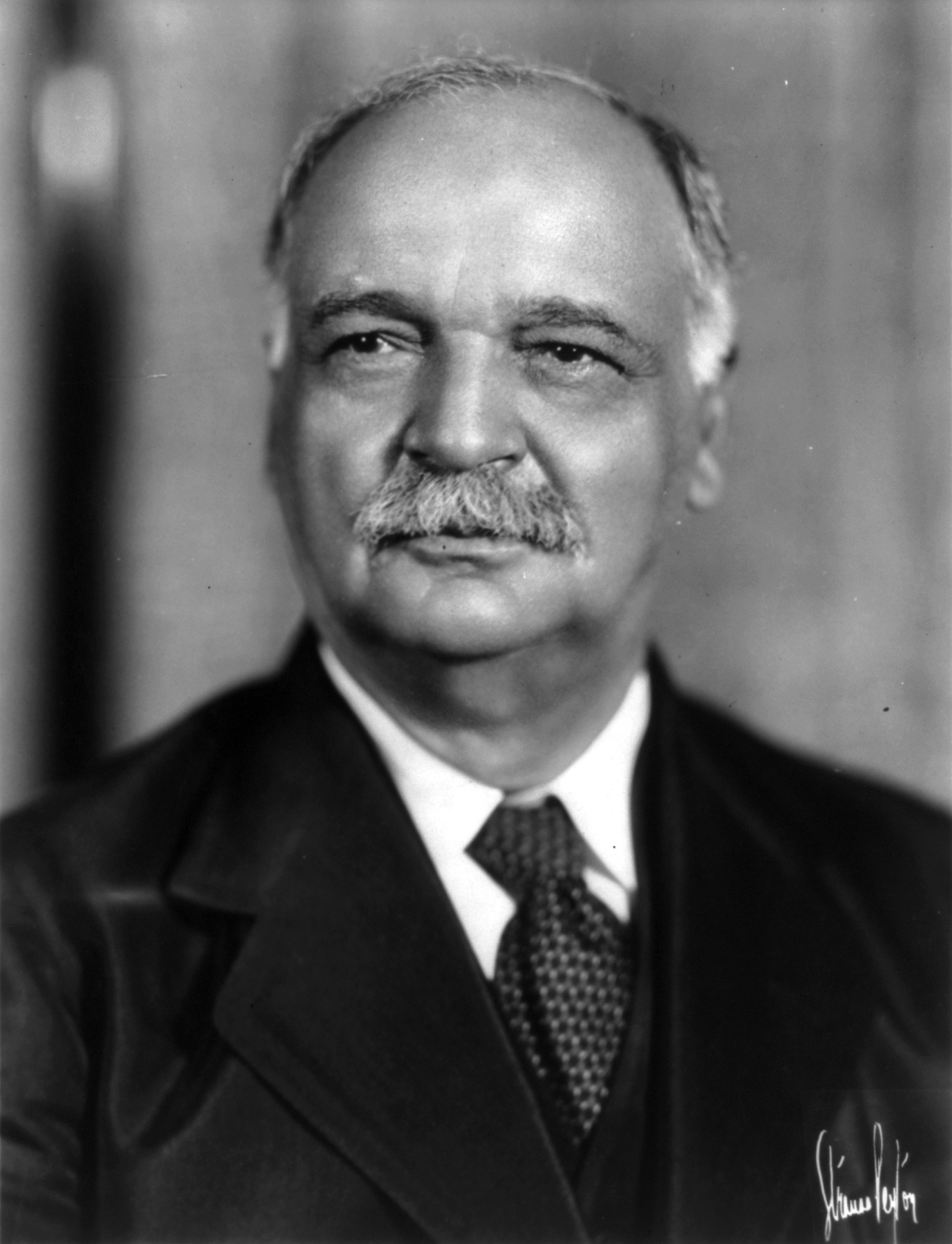
Charles Curtis

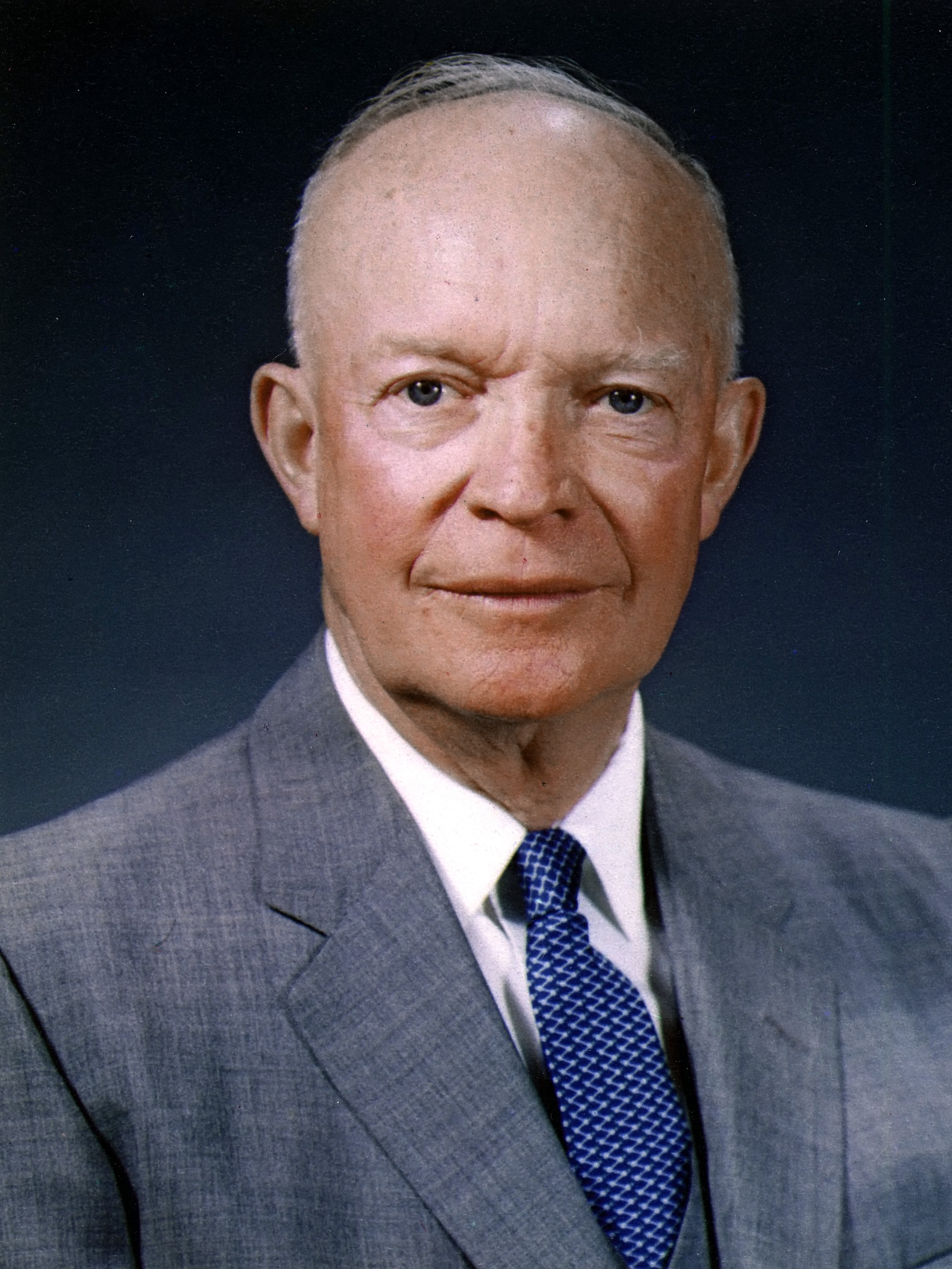
Dwight D. Eisenhower

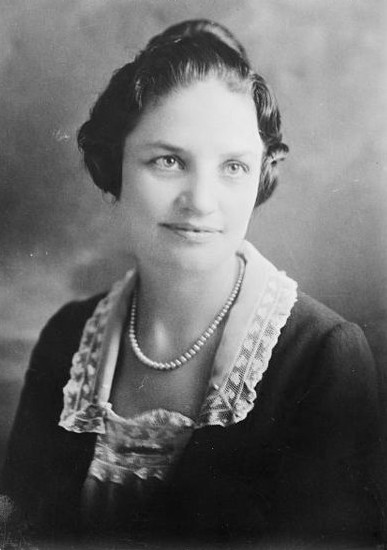
Mabel Walker Willebrandt

- John Anderson Jr. (1917–2014), Kansas governor; De Soto
- Sheila Bair (born 1954), former chair of the Federal Deposit Insurance Corporation (FDIC), former commissioner and acting chair of the Commodity Futures Trading Commission; Independence
- Earl Browder (1891–1973), general secretary, Communist Party USA; Wichita
- Sam Brownback (born 1956), U.S. representative, U.S. senator, Kansas governor; Garnett
- Arthur Capper (1865–1951), Kansas governor and newspaper editor; Garnett
- Frank Carlson (1893–1987), U.S. representative, U.S. senator, and Kansas governor; Concordia
- Georgia Neese Clark Gray (1900–1995), first female treasurer of United States; Richland
- Ty Cobb (born 1950), special counsel to the president of the United States; Great Bend
- Samuel J. Crawford (1835–1913), Kansas governor; Garnett
- Charles Curtis (1860–1936), U.S. senator and 31st vice president of United States; Topeka
- Harry Darby (1895–1987), businessman and U.S. senator; Kansas City
- George Docking (1904–1964), Kansas governor; Clay Center
- Bob Dole (1923–2021), U.S. senator from Kansas (1969–1996) and 1996 Republican nominee for president; Russell
- Dwight Eisenhower (1890–1969), 34th president of the United States, Allied commander in World War II; Abilene (born in Denison, Texas)
- Joan Finney (1925–2001), Kansas governor; Topeka
- Marlin Fitzwater (born 1942), press secretary for Presidents Ronald Reagan and George H. W. Bush; Abilene
- Robert Gates (born 1943), CIA director, U.S. secretary of defense; Wichita
- Robert L. Gernon (1943–2005), Kansas Supreme Court justice; Sabetha
- Dan Glickman (born 1944), secretary of agriculture, president of Motion Picture Association of America; Wichita
- Bill Graves (born 1953), Kansas governor; Salina
- Paul Ranous Greever (1891–1943), Wyoming congressman; Lansing
- Gary Hart (born 1936), Colorado senator; Ottawa
- Carl Hatch (1889–1963), New Mexico senator; Kirwin
- Mike Hayden (born 1944), Kansas governor; Colby
- Wally Hickel (1919–2010), governor of Alaska, U.S. secretary of interior; Claflin
- Laura M. Johns (1849–1935), president, Kansas State Suffrage Association; president, Kansas Republican Woman's Association
- Ural Alexis Johnson (1908–1997), diplomat and ambassador; Falun
- Tim Kaine (born 1958), Virginia governor and senator; 2016 Democratic nominee for vice president; Overland Park
- Nancy Kassebaum Baker (born 1932), Kansas senator; Topeka
- James H. "Dog" Kelley (1833–1912), frontiersman, mayor of Dodge City
- William P. Lambertson (1880–1957), U.S. congressman; Fairview
- Alf Landon (1887–1987), Kansas governor, 1936 presidential candidate; Topeka
- Frank H. Lee (1873–1952), Missouri U.S. representative; De Soto
- John Martin (1839–1889), Kansas governor, newspaperman, Civil War colonel; Atchison
- George McGill (1879–1963), Kansas senator; Wichita
- Jerry Moran (born 1954), U.S. representative and senator; Plainville
- Roger Noriega (born 1959), U.S. assistant secretary of state for Western Hemisphere Affairs; Wichita
- Gale Norton (born 1954), U.S. secretary of the interior; Wichita
- Lawton Nuss (born 1952), State Supreme Court justice; Salina
- Kate Richards O'Hare (1877–1948), American Socialist Party activist; Ottawa County
- Leslie Osterman (born 1947), member of Kansas House of Representatives; Wichita
- Shirley Phelps-Roper (born 1957), lawyer for Westboro Baptist Church; Topeka
- Chuck Reed (born 1948), mayor of San Jose, California; Garden City
- Roy Romer (born 1928), Colorado governor; Garden City
- Susanna M. Salter (1860–1961), mayor of Argonia, first female mayor in U.S.
- Bradley Schlozman (born 1971), controversial figure in George W. Bush Administration's dismissal of U.S. attorneys controversy; Overland Park
- K. Gary Sebelius (born 1949), U.S. magistrate judge, husband of Kathleen Sebelius; Norton
- Harold Sebring (1898–1968), Nuremberg Trial judge; Olathe
- Arlen Specter (1930–2012), Pennsylvania senator; Russell
- Dale Swenson (born c. 1957), member of Kansas House; Wichita
- Forest Tennant, physician and two-term mayor of Covina, California, advocate for the use of opioids for pain management; Dodge City
- Martin E. Trapp (1877–1951), Oklahoma governor; Robinson
- Rosalie E. Wahl (1924–2014), associate justice, Minnesota Supreme Court; Caney
- William Walker (1800–1874), provisional governor of Nebraska Territory, Wyandot chief
- Mabel Walker Willebrandt (1889–1963), U.S. assistant attorney general 1921–29; Woodsdale
- Harry Hines Woodring (1890–1967), Kansas governor and secretary of war under Franklin Roosevelt; Elk City
- Robert M. Wright (1840–1915), member of Kansas House of Representatives; a founder of Dodge City
- Ron Wyden (born 1949), Oregon senator; Wichita

=== Military and national security ===
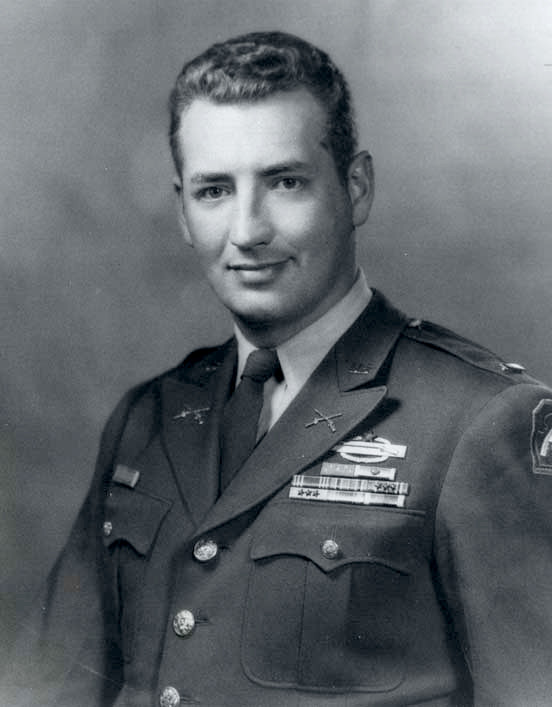
Stanley T. Adams

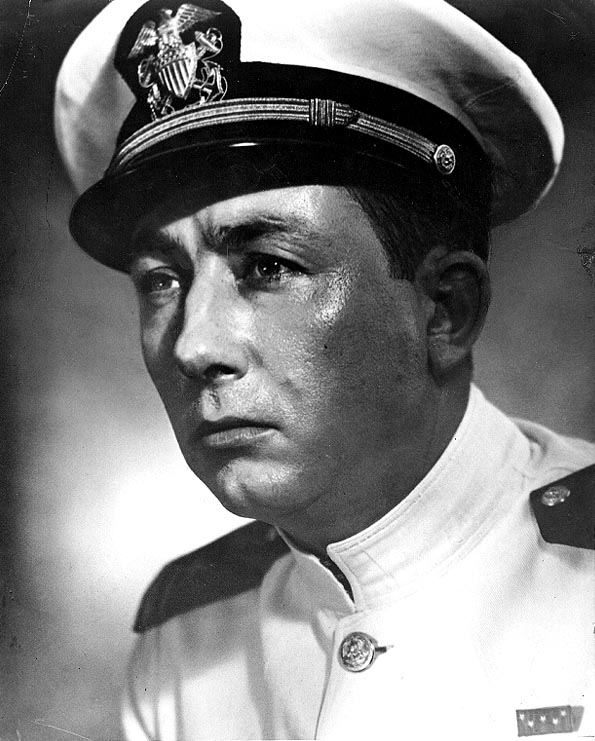
Donald K. Ross

- Stanley T. Adams (1922–1999), Korean War Medal of Honor recipient; De Soto
- Wilbur Bestwick (1911–1972), first sergeant major of the Marine Corps; Sabetha
- Kendall Carl Campbell (1917–1942), ensign, posthumous WWII Navy Cross recipient; Garden City
- Richard Cowan (1922–1944), WWII Medal of Honor recipient; Wichita
- Dwight Eisenhower (1890–1969), 34th president of the United States, Allied commander in World War II, 5-star general; Abilene (born in Denison, Texas)
- Rebecca L. Ediger (born 1952), agent in charge of Presidential Protective Division of U.S. Secret Service; Peabody (born in Newton)
- Harry D. Felt (1902–1992), WWII Naval aviator and admiral; Topeka
- Arthur M. Ferguson (1877–1922), colonel, Medal of Honor recipient, Philippine–American War; Coffey County
- Frederick N. Funston (1865–1917), major general, Medal of Honor recipient; Iola
- John E. Gingrich (1897–1960), U.S. Navy four-star admiral, first chief of security for Atomic Energy Commission; Dodge City
- James Harbord (1866–1947), U.S. Army, WWI Distinguished Service Cross; Bushong
- Joseph Henderson (1869–1938), Medal of Honor recipient, Philippine–American War; Fort Leavenworth
- Elizabeth P. Hoisington (1918–2007), first WAC officer promoted to brigadier general; Newton
- Herbert Loper (1896–1989), major general, U.S. Army; Norcatur
- Homer A. McCrerey (1919–1999), U.S. Navy meteorologist and oceanographer; Hiawatha
- Richard Myers (born 1942), general, U.S. Air Force, 15th chairman of Joint Chiefs; Olathe
- Ross Myers (born 1959), commander of the United States Cyber Command, Tenth Fleet; Garden City
- Danny J. Petersen (1949–1970), specialist 4, U.S. Army, posthumous Vietnam Medal of Honor recipient; Netawaka
- George S. Robb (1887–1972), U.S. Army, WWI Medal of Honor recipient; Assaria
- Bernard W. Rogers (1921–2008), NATO Supreme Allied Commander, Europe; Fairview
- Donald K. Ross (1910–1992), first Medal of Honor recipient in WWII, United States Navy; Beverly
- Conrad Schmidt (1830–1908), Civil War, Medal of Honor recipient; Ogden
- Duane D. Thiessen (born 1951), major general, USMC; Goessel
- Grant F. Timmerman (1919–1944), sergeant, USMC, posthumous Medal of Honor recipient; Americus
- William B. Trembley (1877–1952), Medal of Honor recipient, Philippine–American War; Johnson
- Lewis William Walt (1913–1989), general, USMC, initiated Combined Action Program in Vietnam; Wabaunsee County

=== Religious ===
- William Bickerton (1815–1905), founder of the Church of Jesus Christ (Bickertonite) and the Zion Valley, Kansas, colony; St. John
- Charles J. Chaput (born 1944), archbishop, Roman Catholic Archdiocese of Denver; Concordia
- Sheri L. Dew (born 1953), influential Latter-day Saint spokeswoman; Ulysses
- Bart D. Ehrman (born 1955), New Testament scholar; Lawrence
- Jerry Johnston (born 1959), Southern Baptist Convention evangelist and pastor; Overland Park
- Emil Kapaun (1916–1951), Army chaplain, Korean War, posthumous Medal of Honor recipient, Catholic martyr and sainthood candidate; Pilsen
- Ron Kenoly (born 1944), musical worship leader; Coffeyville
- Lillian M. Mitchner (1862/64–1954), president, Kansas State Woman's Christian Temperance Union; Topeka
- Fred Phelps (1929–2014), leader of Westboro Baptist Church; Topeka
- James Reeb (1927–1965), Unitarian minister beaten to death by segregationists in Selma, Alabama, during the Civil Rights Movement; Wichita
- David Laurin Ricken (born 1954), bishop of Roman Catholic Diocese of Cheyenne; Dodge City
- Richard Rohr (born 1943), Franciscan priest and writer on spirituality; Topeka
- Michael Jarboe Sheehan (born 1939), archbishop of Santa Fe; Wichita
- M. Madeline Southard (1877–1967), Methodist minister and writer
- John Joseph Sullivan (1920–2001), bishop of Grand Island, Nebraska, and Kansas City-St. Joseph; Horton
- Gerald B. Winrod (1900–1957), evangelical Christian and Nazi sympathizer; Wichita
- Gordon Winrod (1926–2018), Christian Identity minister; Hesston

== Scientists and programmers ==
- Charles Bachman (1924–2017), computer scientist; Manhattan
- C. Olin Ball (1893–1982), food scientist; Abilene
- Barnum Brown (1873–1963), paleontologist; Carbondale
- John D. Carmack (born 1970), computer programmer; Shawnee Mission
- George Washington Carver (1864–1943), botanist and chemist; Minneapolis, Kansas
- James F. Crow (1916–2012), geneticist; Wichita
- Carl Owen Dunbar (1891–1979), geologist and paleontologist; Cherokee County
- David Fairchild (1869–1954), botanist and explorer; Manhattan
- Philip Fox (1878–1944), astronomer; Manhattan
- Howard K. Gloyd (1902–1978), herpetologist; De Soto
- Ebbe Hoff (1906–1985), neurologist; Rexford
- Jack Kilby (1923–2005), inventor of the integrated circuit; Great Bend
- Homer A. McCrerey (1919–1999), meteorologist and oceanographer; Hiawatha
- Ray McIntire (1918–1996), research engineer, inventor of Styrofoam; Gardner
- Karl Menninger (1893–1990), psychiatrist; Topeka
- Charles D. Michener (1918–2015), entomologist; Lawrence
- Lou Montulli, a founding engineer at Netscape and responsible for many HTML and web innovations
- Ernest Fox Nichols (1869–1924), scientist; Leavenworth County
- Wallace Pratt (1885–1981), petroleum geologist; Phillipsburg
- Walter Sutton (1877–1916), geneticist and physician; Russell
- George Tiller (1941–2009), medical doctor and controversial late-term abortion provider; Wichita
- Clyde Tombaugh (1906–1997), astronomer; Burdett
- Samuel Wendell Williston (1852–1918), scientist; Manhattan
- Douglas Youvan (born 1955), biophysicist and inventor; Frontenac

== Others ==
=== Notable individuals ===
- Danni Boatwright (born 1975), winner of Survivor: Guatemala; Tonganoxie
- Emily Gibson Braerton (1884–1966), V.P. Daughters of the American Revolution {1950–53}; Lawrence
- Deborah Bryant (born 1946), Miss America 1966; Overland Park
- Erin Brockovich (born 1960), environmental activist; Lawrence
- Oliver Brown (1918–1961), welder; Topeka
- Richard Christy (born 1974), comedian on the Howard Stern Show; Fort Scott
- Hilda Clark (1872–1932), operetta soprano and model in early Coca-Cola advertisements; Leavenworth
- Earl Cole (born 1971), winner of Survivor: Fiji; Kansas City
- Racquel Darrian (born 1968), pornographic film star; Hutchinson
- Elmer Dresslar Jr. (1925–2005), voice actor and baritone voice of Jolly Green Giant commercials; St. Francis
- Alvin Dewey (1912–1987), special agent of the Kansas Bureau of Investigation; Garden City
- Ann Dunham (1942–1995), mother of Barack Obama; Wichita
- Madelyn and Stanley Dunham (1922–2008 and 1918–1992), grandparents of Barack Obama; Peru
- Tara Dawn Holland (born 1972), Miss America 1997; Overland Park
- Carrie Ingalls (1870–1946), sister of Laura Ingalls Wilder; born in Little House on the Prairie near Independence
- Vicki Lynn Lasseter (born 1960), February 1981 Playboy Playmate; Iola
- Candy Loving (born 1956), January 1979 Playboy Playmate and 25th Anniversary Playmate; Oswego
- Waldo McBurney (1902–2009), formerly listed as oldest worker; Quinter
- Kelli McCarty (born 1969), Miss USA 1991, actress, pornographic films; Liberal
- Janet Murguía (born 1954), president and CEO, National Council of La Raza; Kansas City
- Dan Perkins (born 1961), cartoonist, pen name "Tom Tomorrow"; Wichita
- Jeff Probst (born 1962), television personality and host of Survivor; Wichita
- Darrel Ray (born 1950), psychologist, author, atheist activist, and founder of Recovering from Religion and the associated Secular Therapy Project; Wichita
- Victor Rojas, studio analyst for MLB Network; Overland Park (born in Miami)
- Satanta (1830–1878), chief of Kiowa tribe; western Kansas
- Matt Schlapp, chairman of American Conservative Union; Wichita
- Theresa Vail (born 1990), host of Outdoor Channel's Limitless with Theresa Vail; Manhattan
- Carrie Westcott (born 1969), September 1993 Playboy Playmate; Mission Hills
- Harold F. Williamson (1901–1989), business historian; Piper
- Earl Woods (1932–2006), father of golfer Tiger Woods and first African-American baseball player in the Big Eight Conference; Manhattan

=== Notable historical figures not from Kansas but who participated in a significant event in Kansas ===
- John Brown (1800–1859), abolitionist; Osawatomie
- Buffalo Bill Cody (1846–1917), buffalo hunter and showman; Leavenworth
- Wyatt Earp (1848–1929), lawman; Wichita and Dodge City
- Mary Tenney Gray (1833–1904), known as the "mother of the Women's Club movement in Kansas"; Kansas City
- Dora Hand (1844–1878), dance hall singer, Dodge City
- Wild Bill Hickok (1837–1876), lawman; Hays and Abilene
- John James Ingalls (1833–1900), politician
- Kris Kobach (born 1966), candidate for governor in 2018, Kansas Secretary of State
- James H. Lane (1814–1866), abolitionist, senator and union general; Lawrence
- Bat Masterson (1853–1921), lawman; Dodge City
- Carrie Nation (1846–1911), temperance activist; Medicine Lodge
- Mary Bell Smith (1818-1894), organizer and first president, Kansas Woman's Christian Temperance Union

=== Crime ===
- Edward J. Adams (1887–1921), bank robber and murderer; Hutchinson
- Lowell Lee Andrews (1939–1962), murderer; Wolcott
- John and Kate Bender (1872–1873), serial killers; Labette County
- Fred "Killer" Burke (1893–1940), Prohibition-era gangster; Mapleton
- Mark Essex (1949–1973), mass murderer; Emporia
- Jake and Ralph Fleagle, bank robbers and murderers; Marienthal
- Debora Green (born 1951), murderer; Prairie Village
- Eric Harris (1981–1999), perpetrator, along with Dylan Klebold, of the Columbine High School massacre; Wichita
- Richard Hickock (1931–1965), murderer; Kansas City
- Alvin "Creepy" Karpis (1907–1979), bank robber and member of the Barker Gang; Topeka
- Anna Emmaline McDoulet (1882–1978), female spy for Doolin Gang known as Cattle Annie Lawrence; Seneca
- George Newcomb (1866–1895), member of Bill Doolin's Wild Bunch; Fort Scott
- Duane Earl Pope (born 1943), bank robber and murderer; Roxbury
- Dennis Rader (born 1945), serial killer known as "BTK"; Wichita
- Scott Philip Roeder (born 1958), assassin; Merriam
- Marc Sappington (born 1978), murderer and cannibal, known as the Kansas City Vampire; Kansas City

=== Fictional persons ===
- Courage the Cowardly Dog, lives with his adoptive family in fictional Nowhere, Kansas
- Helen Crump (1962), girlfriend of Sheriff Andy Taylor of Mayberry on The Andy Griffith Show, from rural Kansas
- Dennis the Menace (1951), neighborhood terror, Wichita
- Matt Dillon (1949), marshal, Kansas
- Sam "Squid" Dullard, character on Rocket Power, moves to fictional California town featured in the show in the first episode, revealed in a later episode that he’s from Hutchinson
- Dorothy Gale (1900), farm girl who lived with her Aunt Em and Uncle Henry; transported to the Land of Oz by a tornado, with her dog Toto
- Elmer Gantry (1927), evangelist and title character in the Sinclair Lewis novel of the same name; attended college in Kansas
- Gil Hamilton (c. 2083), futuristic detective, Topeka
- Will Kane (1952), sheriff in the 1952 classic Western High Noon, from Hadleyville, Kansas
- Johnny Kaw (1955), mythical Kansas settler, Manhattan
- Clark Joseph Kent (1938), adopted child of Jonathan and Martha Kent of Smallville, known as the alter ego Superman, born on Krypton as Kal-El
- Lana Lang (1950), Superboy's teenage love interest, Smallville
- Ted Lasso (2020), head coach of the fictional London-based AFC Richmond, Overland Park
- Major Astro (1960), astronaut portrayed by local character actor Tom Leahy; host of a children's television program, Wichita
- Colleen McMurphy, lead character from China Beach, from a "small town" in Kansas
- Cameron Mitchell, Lieutenant Colonel of Stargate SG-1 television series, from Auburn
- Jack B. Quick (1999), boy genius, Queerwater Creek, Kansas
- Amanda Rogers (born 2351), character on Star Trek: The Next Generation, Topeka
- Pete Ross (1961), Superboy's best friend, Smallville
- Mary Ann Summers, traveler on a "three-hour tour" that was lost at sea on Gilligan's Island, Winfield
- Annie Wilson (1993), aspiring actress, Wichita
- Dean Winchester (1979), demon hunter, Lawrence
- Sam Winchester (1983), demon hunter, Lawrence
- Wizard of Oz (1900), balloonist, magician, ruler of the Land of Oz (1939 movie version only)

== See also ==
- Lists of people from Kansas
- List of Kansas suffragists
