= Kansan =

A Kansan is a native resident of the State of Kansas. Kansan may also refer to:

- Kansan glaciation
- List of Kansan people
- University Daily Kansan, the student newspaper of the University of Kansas
- AT-11 Kansan and SNB-1 Kansan, military and naval variants respectively of the Beechcraft Model 18 twin engine airplane

== See also ==
- Hanshan (poet)
