= Teresa MacBain =

American Methodist minister

- Occupations: Educator, University Adjunct Faculty
- Known for: Former Minister, The Clergy Project

Teresa MacBain is a former Methodist minister who came out as a nonbeliever in 2012, and returned to her faith in 2016.

== Biography ==
MacBain was raised as a Southern Baptist and she wanted to be a pastor like her father when she grew up. MacBain recalls that she felt that God had called her to become a pastor at an early age. MacBain eventually became the pastor of Lake Jackson United Methodist Church in Florida. After serving in ministry for many years, she began to question her faith. Aspects of the Bible did not seem 'to add up', but MacBain was not able to reconcile those questions.

=== Losing faith ===
During her time as a pastor, MacBain began to have questions about difficult Biblical passages, the problem of evil, and suffering. She considered her questions carefully, initially believing this would strengthen her faith. As MacBain worked through her doubts she "found that religion had so many holes in it, [that she] couldn't believe it." .

MacBain told the Christian Post that her process of becoming an atheist was gradual. She states that she had no issues with the church structure or organization: her deconversion was "just theological." She pointed to "the contradictory nature of the Bible; the lack of scientific or historical foundation or accuracy" as starting points to her questioning her faith. MacBain cites contradictions in the Bible, also tough questions like, “Where was God when the hurricane hit killing so many innocent people?” and “How could God condemn someone to hell who has never even heard of him?” and “Would a loving God torment people for eternity?” A time came when MacBain could no longer ignore these types of questions. In late 2011, MacBain realized she was an atheist.

=== The Clergy Project ===
MacBain became one of the first pastors helped by The Clergy Project, a group for clergy who have lost their faith. She joined in 2011 under the pseudonym "Lynn." MacBain felt less alone with the support of The Clergy Project. but still could not easily escape her work. MacBain applied for alternative employment but could not explain why she wanted to leave the ministry. She became the Clergy Project's first female "graduate."

=== Leaving the ministry ===
MacBain left the ministry in March 2012. After coming to terms with the conclusion that she did not believe in God any longer, she felt that leaving her position as pastor was the right thing to do. She "came out" publicly as an atheist at the 2012 American Atheists convention. After she came out as an atheist, she said: "An enormous number of Christians have threatened to do physical harm to me. Many others have been kind in their response." MacBain reported that she was also ostracized by friends and extended family, but that her husband and children were supportive. American Atheists named her "Atheist of the Year" in 2012. After she lost her job and said that other "job interviews were cancelled" in her hometown of Tallahassee, the Humanists of Florida Association helped by offering to pay her salary for a year.

=== Subsequent life ===
MacBain worked as the Public Relations Director for American Atheists for a brief period of time. She moved back to Florida in 2013 to work as the Executive Director of the Humanists of Florida. Later that year, she was hired as the director of the Humanist Community Project at Harvard. She moved from Florida to the Cambridge area. Her work with the Humanist Community Project was to help secular communities build connections, and if they wanted to, secular alternatives to church.

MacBain was part of a controversy in 2013 when it came out that she had fraudulently listed a Masters of Divinity from Duke University on her resume to Harvard. She was quoted in saying "I have committed a grave error in judgment that I deeply regret. While I did not do anything with malice or intention to harm others, my actions were still wrong." MacBain stated in a public apology that many assumed she had a M.Div, but she was not initially aware of this fact. She also admitted that once she became aware of the situation, she was not sure of how to remedy the situation. In her public apology, she indicated that her inaction led to the situation at Harvard. It was true that she attended Duke, but only for the first year summer course in the United Methodist Church Course of Study for Local Pastors. (University course credit is not granted through this program.) Summer Course of Study | Duke Divinity School

After the controversy, MacBain continued to be active in supporting nontheists in their activities to build alternatives to church, such as helping communities create Sunday Assemblies. MacBain describes the importance of communities for secular people, "We all need a place to belong, to be accepted and supported, to celebrate life and mourn loss, and to just have fun."

=== Returning to faith ===
MacBain is no longer involved with the freethought movement, and has returned to her faith. After several years as a prominent atheist, MacBain returned to a life of faith, stating “When I was at my lowest point, I found God right there beside me. Realizing the true meaning of grace led me to embrace life as a Progressive Christian.” Her journey brought her to a place where she is "ok with not being able to define everything" and describes her faith as "an honest belief where questions are a part of the experience."

She currently lives in Alabama where she works as an adjunct instructor and is a musician in a local band." She completed a BA in Organizational Leadership in 2018, graduating summa cum laude and an MS ed in Instructional Design and Technology in 2019 from Samford University in Birmingham, AL.
