= Jerry DeWitt =

American activist

- Born: September 17, 1969 (age 57)
- Occupations: Writer, public speaker
- Children: Paul (Son)
- Writing career
- Genre: Nonfiction
- Notable work: Hope After Faith

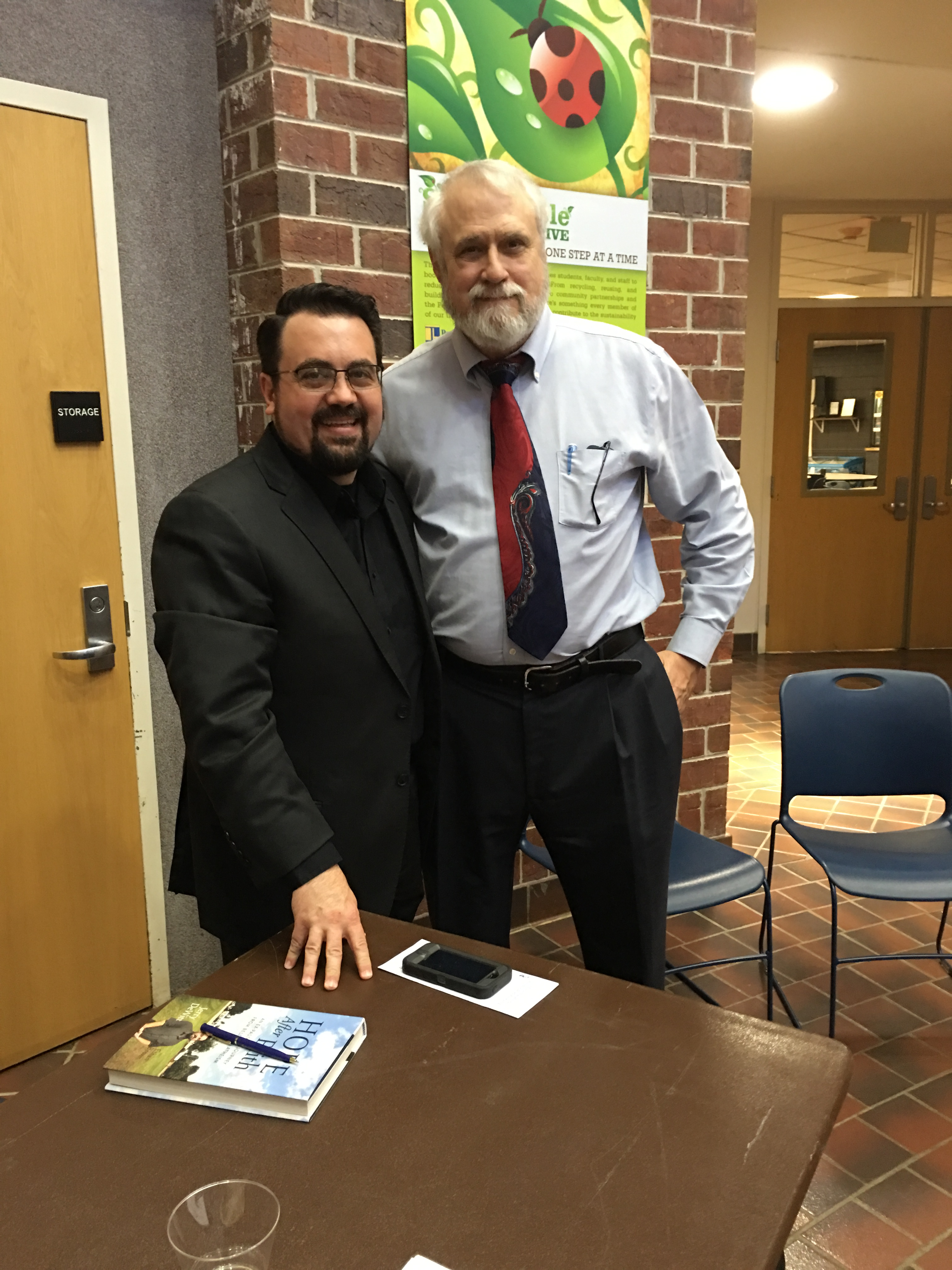
Jerry DeWitt (left) with Larry Rhodes in 2016

Jerry DeWitt (born September 17, 1969) is an American author and public speaker. He is a former pastor of two evangelical churches and publicly deconverted to atheism in 2011.

== Biography ==
DeWitt is a former pastor of two churches surrounding DeRidder, Louisiana, a town where two-thirds of the population report membership in a faith organization. DeWitt first experienced doubts about his religious beliefs when he contemplated the idea of hell. He later found himself unable to invoke God's help after a congregant asked him to pray for her injured brother. He preached for the last time in April 2011.

After becoming aware that he no longer held theistic beliefs, DeWitt joined The Clergy Project (TCP), a group which lends confidential support to preachers who no longer believe in God. TCP was founded by Richard Dawkins, Daniel Dennett, Linda LaScola, former preacher Dan Barker, and anonymous non-believing ministers "Adam Mann" and "Chris." DeWitt's outing as an atheist occurred in October 2011 after a photo circulated online of DeWitt and Dawkins, taken at a meeting of freethinkers. DeWitt was the first member of TCP to drop anonymity and speak freely about his involvement in the project. Following his departure from ministry and after more information emerged on DeWitt's loss of faith, he was subsequently fired from his non-ministerial job as well. Shortly thereafter, his wife then separated from him.

DeWitt has written a book based on his career and experiences entitled Hope After Faith. The 288-page autobiographical book was written by Dewitt and Ethan Brown, and published in 2013 by Da Capo Press.

== Community Mission Chapel ==
The former fundamentalist minister hosted the first meeting of the Community Mission Chapel, which DeWitt calls a "Secular Service". In a story for the New York Times, DeWitt said, "Just because we value critical thinking and the scientific method, that doesn't mean we suddenly become disembodied and we can no longer benefit from our emotional lives."
