= The Clergy Project =

Nonprofit organization

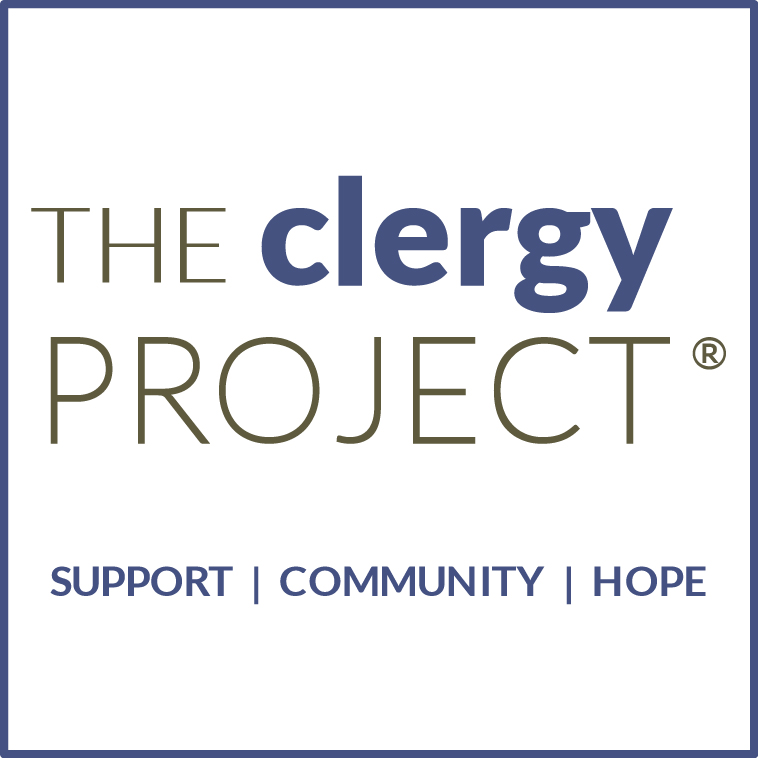
- Abbreviation: TCP
- Formation: 2011; 15 years ago
- Founders: Dan Barker; Richard Dawkins; Daniel Dennett; Linda LaScola; Carter "Adam Mann" Warden; "Chris"
- Type: Non-profit
- Legal status: 501(c)(3) educational organization
- Region served: Worldwide
- President: Duane Grady
- Affiliations: Freedom From Religion Foundation; Richard Dawkins Foundation for Reason and Science
- Website: clergyproject.org

The Clergy Project (TCP) is a nonprofit organization based in the United States that provides peer support to current and former religious leaders who no longer believe in a God or other supernatural elements. The group's focus is to provide private online forums for its participants, career transition assistance (including career coaching grants), and subsidized psychotherapy sessions in partnership with Recovering from Religion's Secular Therapy Project.

== About ==
Launched in March 2011 as a collaborative effort to provide an online space where deconverted clergy could gather to support and encourage one another, the Clergy Project eventually grew to become its own independent organization, receiving 501(c)(3) status in early 2015. An all-volunteer-led organization overseen by a board of directors and staffed by a team of committees, TCP seeks "to provide support, community, and hope to current and former religious professionals who no longer hold supernatural beliefs."

From the very beginning, the Clergy Project's efforts have centered on its online community of forums with a secured, private website that is only accessible to screened, registered forum participants. Project applicants must meet two qualifications for forum admission: being both religious professionals (current or formerly employed) and non-supernaturalist. Though most Clergy Project participants come from various streams of Christianity, membership also includes those of Judaism, Buddhism, Hinduism, Islam, and Scientology.

In January 2018, the Clergy Project's board of directors selected Lon Ostrander to serve as its third president, following Terry Plank (2014–2016) and Drew Bekius (2017).

In May 2021, the Clergy Project joined the Secular Coalition for America.

== History ==
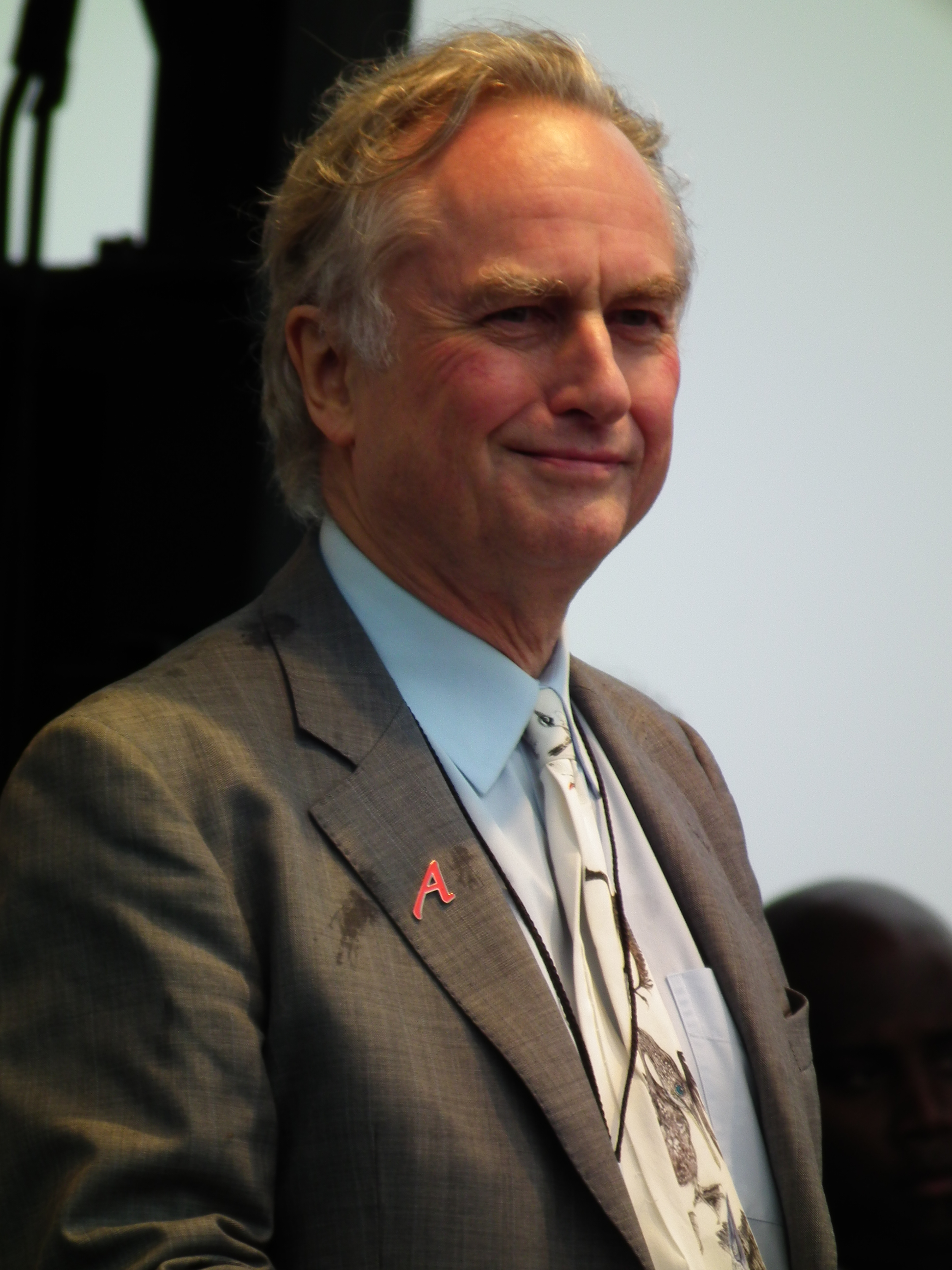
Richard Dawkins

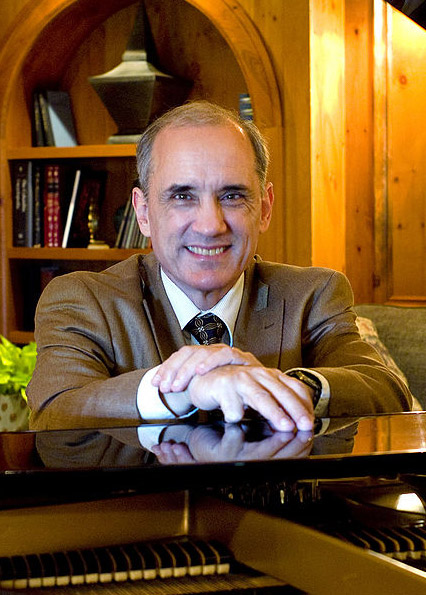
Dan Barker

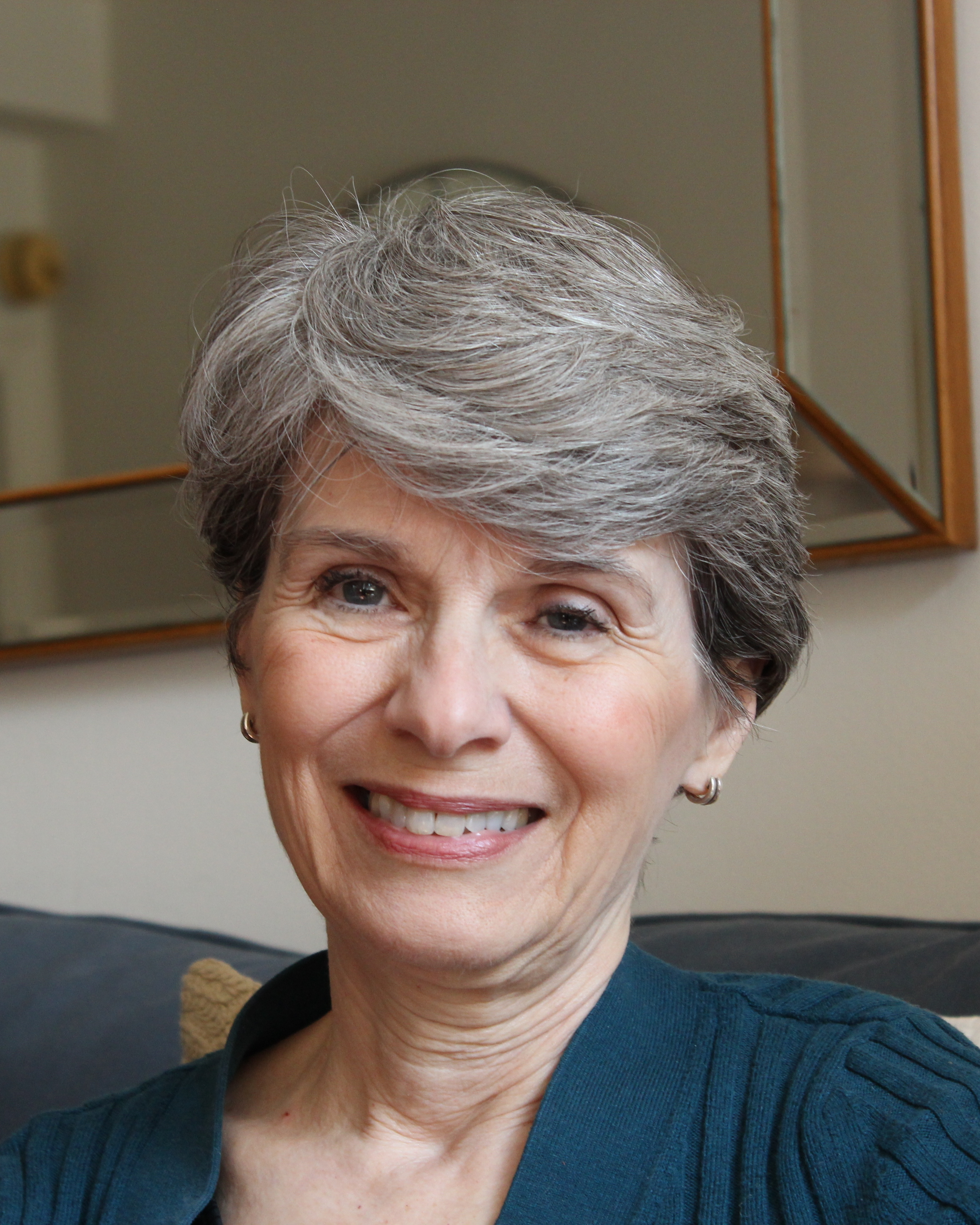
Linda LaScola

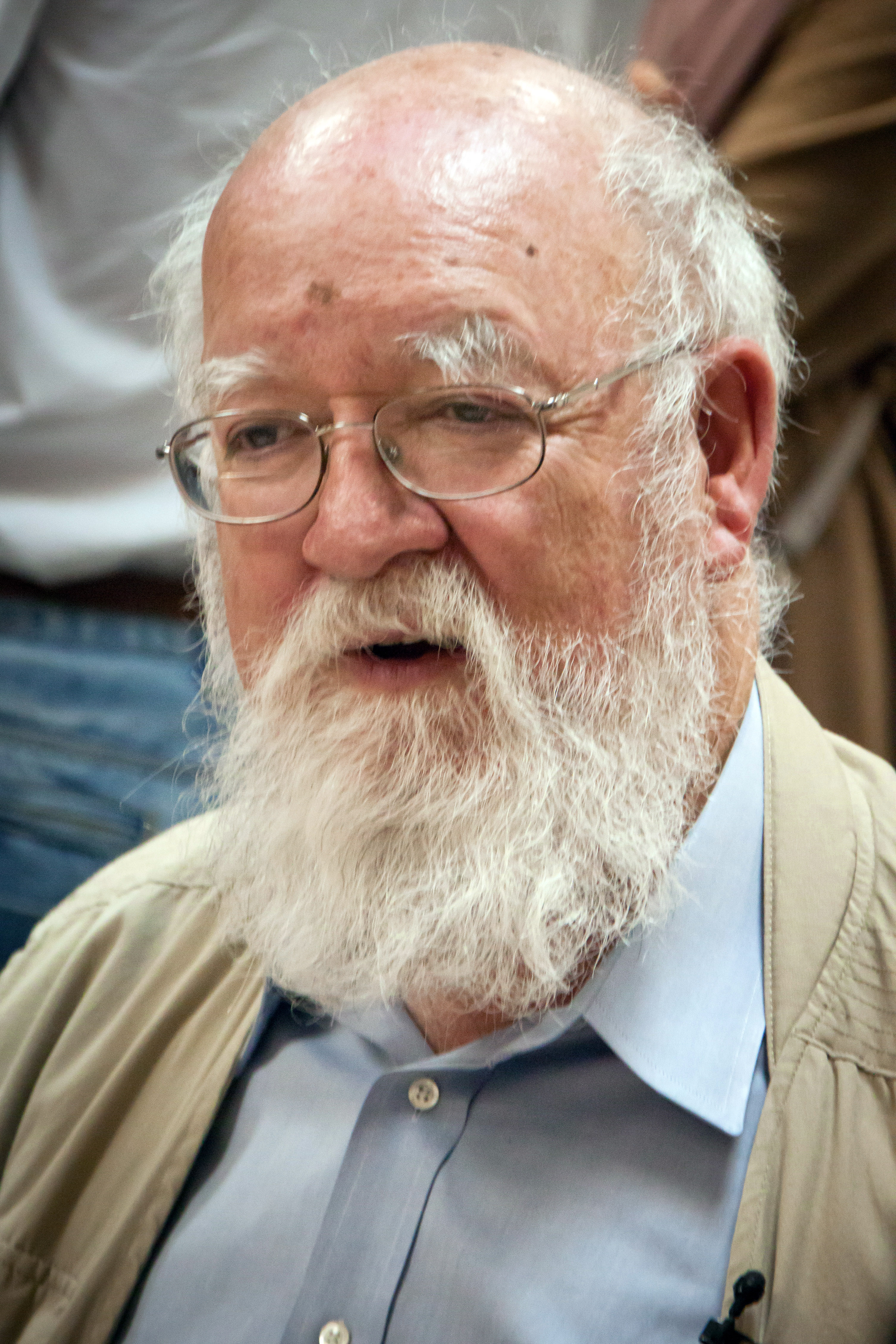
Daniel Dennett

The Clergy Project traces its origins to the 2006 International Humanist and Ethical Union Convention in Reykjavík, Iceland, where Dan Barker, a former Christian minister, met with scientist and activist Richard Dawkins. At the convention, Dawkins expressed interest in Barker's former history as a minister and in better understanding the challenges that come with leaving professional ministry, such as translating the value of a Master of Divinity degree to secular employers and the loss of community support structures. Dawkins wanted to find a way to help others in situations like Barker's, but a solution did not immediately present itself.

In 2010, the philosopher Daniel Dennett and the researcher Linda LaScola published a pilot study called "Preachers Who Are Not Believers". Barker had assisted them in locating three of their five original participants, and a larger study was later conducted and published as Dennett and LaScola's book Caught in the Pulpit: Leaving Belief Behind. This second study featured 30 additional participants.

Also in 2010, Barker and Dawkins met once again to discuss what a potential project might look like in their efforts to help clergy closeted in disbelief. This time Dawkins brought Robin Elisabeth Cornwell on board, then-executive director of the Richard Dawkins Foundation for Reason and Science. Soon she met with LaScola and Barker at the National Museum of the American Indian's Mitsitam Cafe in Washington, D.C., in January 2011. Here they planned the details of what would become their project's Online Community of Forums, aided by two anonymous current ministers on the other side of their computer screens. Those two anonymous participants went by the pseudonyms "Adam Mann" and "Chris".

On March 20, 2011, the Clergy Project officially launched with 52 charter members, all of whom were longtime contacts of Barker's and participants from LaScola and Dennett's study.

The Richard Dawkins Foundation provided the funding and technical support needed to create and administer TCP's Online Community of Forums as well as the subsequent website ClergyProject.org, which was later launched as a marketing tool and application portal. The Freedom From Religion Foundation likewise assisted TCP with a focus on its financial side.

As TCP grew to evolve beyond a mere project, its ad-hoc governing board implemented the role of executive director, appointing Teresa MacBain as acting executive director, who only served a few months in 2012, followed by Catherine Dunphy who served throughout 2013. In early 2014, the ad-hoc board decided to discontinue plans for an executive director position, instead determining that TCP would remain entirely volunteer-led without paid staff, overseen directly by a board of directors and staffed by a number of committees. Terry Plank was selected to serve as TCP's first president, along with John Compere as vice-president, Gretta Vosper as secretary, and Robert Parham as treasurer. The process of incorporation was completed one year later, with the Clergy Project becoming its own 501(c)(3) in early 2015. TCP's first annual meeting took place on the Online Community of Forums in January 2016.

As of September 2019, TCP reached a milestone of 1,000 verified non-believing clergy (current and former) participating.

== Services ==
=== Online community ===
The focus of the Clergy Project is that they have a private online platform for screened and registered participants, who are "current or former religious professionals who no longer hold supernatural beliefs". Clergy and other professional religious leaders can come out "anonymously, using an alias" and avatar before they are ready to come out completely. Members can ask for help, seek information and find themselves in a community where they are not being judged. Access to the forum is "invitation only".

Many of the individuals use the online community to find support that they are lacking in their day-to-day lives.

The online community also provides the kind of support that former clergy need because of the sense of loss that many feel when leaving their religion. The process of coming out of theology is often compared to experiencing the death of someone because research shows that there is a sense of loss and a real loss of community support.

=== Transitional assistance grants ===
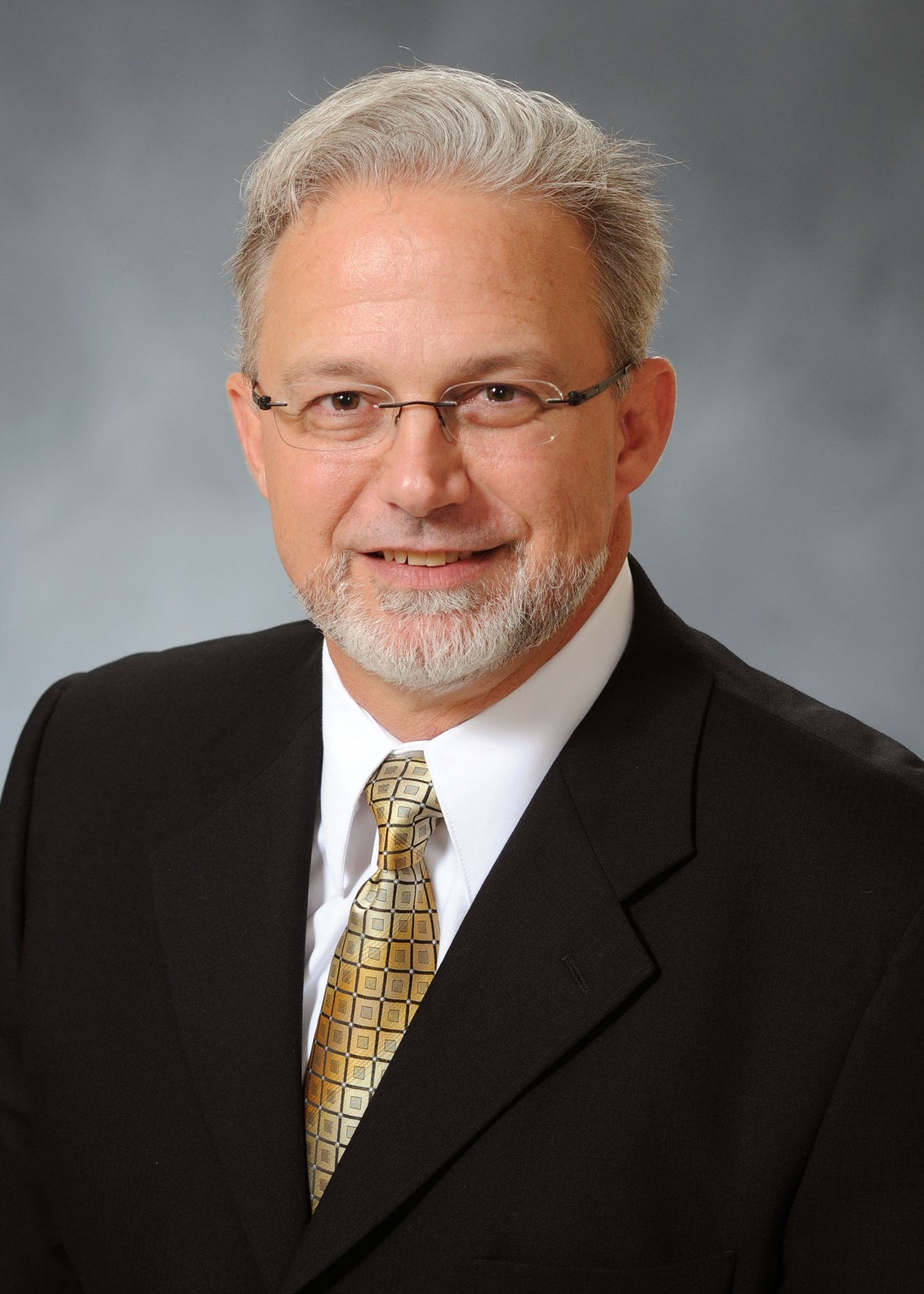
Carter Warden

Many former clergy are very concerned about leaving their religious careers and education because they are not sure where to find jobs while still needing to provide for their families. In order to help forum participants obtain secular employment, the Clergy Project, aided by the Stiefel Freethought Foundation, provide funds for a transitional assistance grant (TAG). The grant provides six months of outplacement services through RiseSmart which helps grant recipients in their search for new employment. Costs for services which include "skills assessment, resume assistance, linkages to job opportunities and access to professional career advisers" is paid directly to RiseSmart. Co-founder Carter "Adam Mann" Warden was the first recipient of an outplacement grant in 2013. He publicly announced his atheism at the Freedom From Religion Foundation Convention in Pittsburgh in October 2016.

=== Free counseling ===
Recovering from Religion's Secular Therapy Project has made free counseling available to all Clergy Project forum participants. Twelve sessions of psychotherapy with secular licensed therapists, either online or on-location, are made available to all forum participants.

== See also ==
- Apostasy
- List of irreligious organizations
- Nicodemite
