= Recovering from Religion =

Non-profit organization supporting people leaving religion

- Founded: 2009; 17 years ago
- Founder: Darrel Ray
- Type: Non-profit
- Legal status: 501(c)(3) organization
- Purpose: Support to people doubting religious faith or who have lost religious faith
- Key people: Darrel Ray (Founder); Gayle Jordan (executive director); Nathan Phelps (emeritus board member)
- Website: recoveringfromreligion.org

Recovering from Religion (RfR) is an international non-profit organization that helps people who have left religion, are in process of leaving, or are dealing with problems arising out of theistic doubt or non-belief. RfR provides support groups, telephone and chat helplines, an online peer support community, and online meetings for "people in their most urgent time of need". It is headquartered in Kansas City, Kansas.

== History ==
Recovering from Religion was founded in 2009 by Kansas-based atheist activist and psychologist Darrel Ray. RfR includes former Westboro Baptist Church member Nathan Phelps among its board of directors as an emeritus board member. In December 2011, RfR appointed Clergy Project member and former pastor Jerry DeWitt as its executive director. Sarah Morehead, once an evangelical Southern Baptist, was appointed its deputy executive director at the same time. DeWitt resigned in 2012 to pursue personal projects. Sarah Morehead was appointed executive director on January 1, 2013, and remained until October 25, 2015. Gayle Jordan was appointed executive director on January 7, 2016.

In 2012, Recovering from Religion included over 100 local chapters scattered across the United States, each one meeting monthly, typically with 10 to 12 participants. By 2013, RfR announced fundraising for its Hotline Project, a toll free phone number featuring trained support agents, which was funded in a matter of weeks, as well as The Secular Therapist Project. In 2014, RfR offered online classes dubbed "Recovering Your Sexuality" for individuals working through the negative impact of religion on their sexual development and identity.

In advance of the twelfth anniversary of RfR in April 2021, Darrel Ray was interviewed and provided an update on the organization. Ray said that RfR directs people to resources including therapy, but "The main thing is dealing with that immediate pain. In particular, from being shunned. The pain can be quite literal when a father beats a child because they don't believe anymore." Ray reported that RfR takes 300-500 chat and phone calls each month, and that there are 275 volunteers in 16 different time zones, and they have access to a library of online resources to provide to the clients.

== Hotline Project ==
RfR launched the Hotline Project on February 27, 2015, with former pastor Teresa MacBain serving as the director. According to MacBain, the hotline is a peer-support call center for people struggling with issues of faith, doubt, and nonbelief. The number in the US is 84 - I Doubt It (844-368-2848). The call agents are trained to offer support and resources without influencing the caller toward or away from any religious belief or lack of belief. "The greatest gift we offer those who call is compassion without judgement. Each person must walk their own path, we just want to be a 'shoulder to lean on' when needed." remarked Ms. MacBain in a speech given at the Gateway to Reason Conference. This service is a free 24/7 service run by volunteers.

The Hotline Project was developed in response to the large volume of calls and e-mails that RfR receives daily from people who are seeking help and support in their time of doubt, and want to leave religion, but do not know to whom to turn or what to do next. The aim of the service provided by this hotline is not to lead callers away from religion, but to provide advice and support for those who struggle with their doubts. In an interview with The Christian Post, Sarah Morehead said: "It's not our place to do anything but encourage exploration and discovery, and to provide a solid support structure as people reconsider the role of religion in their lives". The service was updated in June 2017 offering more stream-lined technology and changed to the Helpline Project, offering not only a call line and chatline but also an online community.

Christian apologist William Lane Craig has criticised the hotline for its perceived "attempt to portray [religion] in a negative way," claiming that it thereby supports atheism and ignores all contrary philosophical arguments. Morehead denies the claim, affirming that its responders do not promote "any form of belief or disbelief" and are "specifically trained to never debate callers under any circumstances."

== The Secular Therapy Project ==
In 2012, Darrel Ray launched the "Secular Therapist Project" as part of RfR. It employed a website dedicated to connecting people seeking help with therapists who do not make use of religious beliefs in therapy. In September 2017, RfR updated the project's name to the Secular Therapy Project, and launched a brand new website and database.

== RfR podcast ==
The RfR podcast has had several format iterations.

The most recent version is hosted by RfR online programming director, anthropologist Dr. Kara Griffin, a former Southern Baptist. These episodes consist of audio recordings adapted from the organization's weekly "RfRx Talks" in which RfR volunteers "talk to those who've been harmed by extreme religion and religious practices. You meet guests with personal experiences and insights in various religions and religious groups, including Mormonism, Jehovah Witnesses, Scientology, religious activism, and more."

A previous iteration of the podcast, begun in October 2018, was co-hosted by Tim Rymel and Bill Prickett. Guests included Lloyd Evans, Janja Lalich, John Smid, and Angela Soffe. Prior to 2018, the podcast was hosted by Scott Smith who, along with his wife, died on November 27, 2017, in a murder-suicide by Scott.

== Ambassador program ==
RfR has an "Ambassador program" whereby volunteers are trained to represent Recovering from Religion in their local communities as well as online. Volunteers must agree to "refrain from engaging in debate about religion or gods, and will instead encourage people to chat, phone, visit our Resources, or join one [of] our local Support Groups."

== See also ==
- American Atheists
- Atheist Alliance International
- Freedom From Religion Foundation
- List of secularist organizations
- Rebecca Hensler (Grief Beyond Belief founder)
- Richard Dawkins Foundation for Reason and Science
- Secular Coalition for America
- Secular Student Alliance
- Sunday Assembly
- The Clergy Project
