= Darrel Ray =

American writer and atheist activist

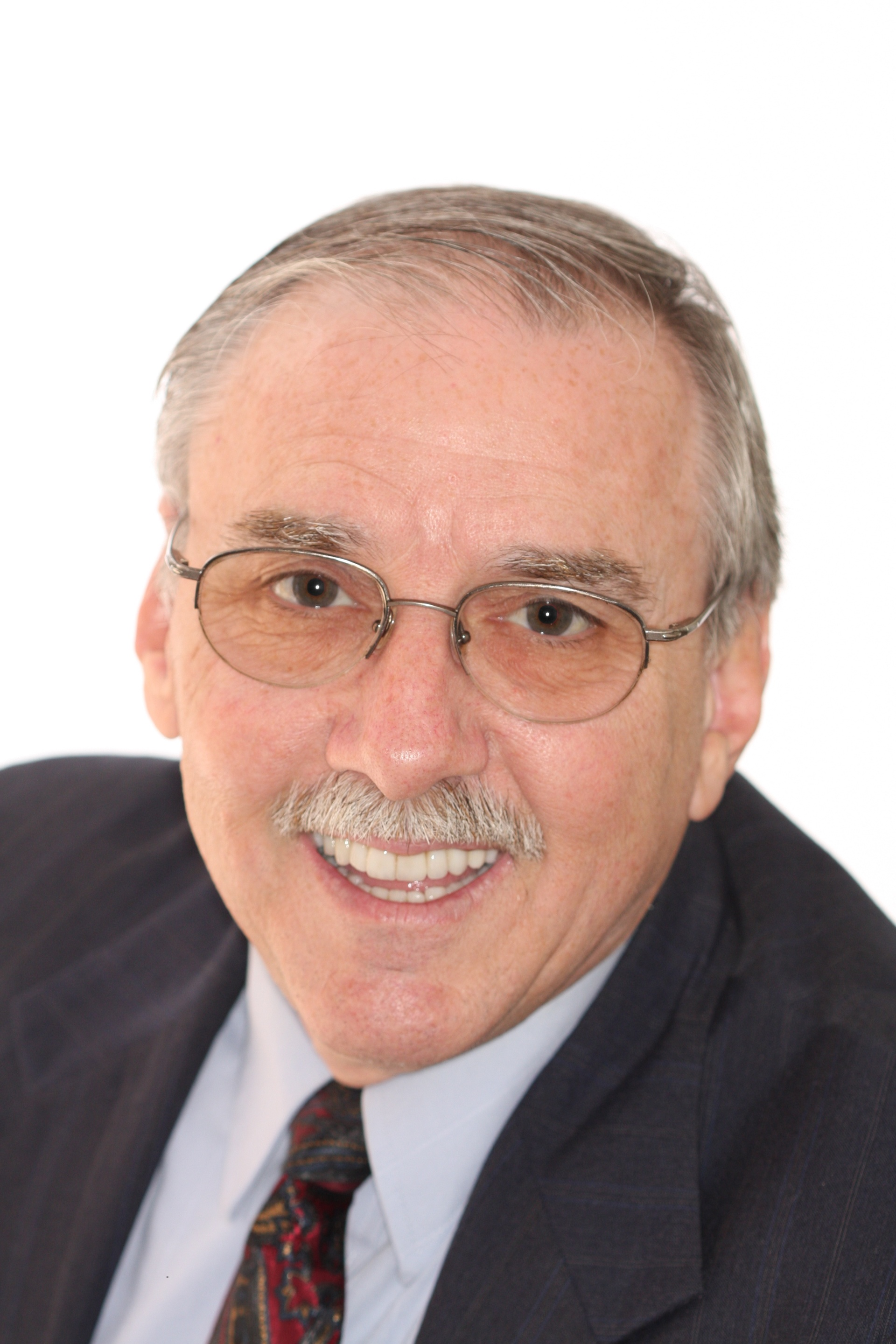
- Born: Darrel Wayne Ray; August 24, 1950 (age 76); Wichita, Kansas
- Education: Friends University; Scarritt College for Christian Workers
- Occupations: Organizational psychologist, author
- Writing career
- Years active: 1978–present
- Genre: Non-fiction
- Subjects: Religion, secularism, organization development, sexuality
- Notable works: The God Virus, Sex and God
- Darrel Ray's voice

Darrel Wayne Ray (born August 24, 1950) is an American organizational psychologist and author who focuses on topics such as workplace organizational culture, secular sexuality, and the treatment of religion-induced trauma. He is a public speaker, podcaster, and atheist activist, and founded the non-profit organization Recovering from Religion as well as the Secular Therapy Project.

== Personal life ==
Ray was raised a fundamentalist Christian in Wichita, Kansas, by parents who eventually became missionaries, and among family members highly involved in church life. This fundamentalist upbringing informs much of his later writing. In 1979, Ray joined the Quaker church, and later he attended the Presbyterian church. From 1969 to 1984, he taught Sunday school, preached, and was a tenor soloist in several church choirs. He became agnostic by his early 30s and an atheist by 40.

Ray is the father of two children and also a grandfather. He is also openly polyamorous.

== Education ==
In 1972, Ray earned a bachelor's degree in sociology/anthropology at Friends University in Wichita, and in 1974 he completed an MA in Church and Community at Scarritt College for Christian Workers in Nashville, Tennessee. In 1978 he finished a doctoral program in psychology at Peabody College of Vanderbilt University, earning his Ed.D.

== Professional work ==
Ray became very involved in organizational culture and in clinical psychology. He has written two books on team-building and served as the director of The Institute for Performance Culture. He also founded Teaming Up, an organizational and team-building coaching program. Ray co-authored two books with Howard Bronstein which describe how to create and manage self-directed teams.

In 2009, Ray founded the organization Recovering from Religion (RfR), an international, non-profit organization which helps people dealing with issues stemming from religious trauma, doubt, and non-belief. As of 2024 Ray serves as the president of the RfR Board of Directors. He also founded the RfR's Secular Therapy Project, which has the goal of helping clients find therapists offering secular and science-based therapy.

Ray has written books about secularism and atheism: The God Virus: How Religion Affects Our Lives and Culture and Sex and God: How Religion Distorts Sexuality. Ray's books about secularism and religion explore how religion interacts with human beings on a personal and cultural level. Ray explores how religious institutions and ideas can be used to control human thoughts and behaviors, especially sexual behaviors. Ray pays special attention to placing sexuality and various religions into context culturally and historically. He takes the stance that many human impulses, feelings and sexual behaviors are normal and can be desirable. Ray's books have influenced other atheists, and his psychological interpretation of Richard Dawkins's concept of religion as a virus has influenced the atheist and secular movement in America.

On August 30, 2014, Ray launched a podcast about human sexuality and atheism called Secular Sexuality, where is he also the host.

Ray has also appeared as a secular psychological expert on television, including ABC News show, Nightline, where in 2011 he spoke out against exorcisms and took a scientific viewpoint towards psychological illnesses that might look like possession.

=== Research ===
In June 1982, Ray and several other authors released a paper describing a study done on male youth offenders in a juvenile correction institute. Ray and the group studied whether population density had any effects on the participants.

In May 2011, Ray and Amanda Brown (an undergraduate at the University of Kansas studying sex and sexuality) released the results of a self-reporting online survey of over 14,500 American secularists, titled "Sex and Secularism: What Happens When You Leave Religion?", and concluding that sex improves dramatically after leaving religion, and that people who are religious exhibit similar sexual behaviors as the non-religious, but experience markedly increased guilt. The study has been criticized for suffering from self-selection bias, due to its recruiting of participants via the science blog Pharyngula.

== Bibliography ==
=== Books ===
- Teaming Up: Making the Transition to a Self-directed, Team-based Organization (IPC Press 1995. ISBN 978-0-07-051646-5 Hardcover.)
- The Performance Culture: Maximizing the Power of Teams (IPC Press, May 2001. ISBN 978-0-9709505-0-5 Paperback.)
- The God Virus: How Religion Affects Our Lives and Culture (IPC Press, December 2009. ISBN 978-0-9709505-1-2 Paperback.)
- The God Virus: How Religion Affects Our Lives and Culture (Dogma Debate, LLC, November 2012. ASIN B00A8D0D9W. Audiobook.)
- Sex and God: How Religion Distorts Sexuality (IPC Press, January 2012. ISBN 978-0-9709505-4-3 Paperback.)
- Sex and God: How Religion Distorts Sexuality (Dogma Debate, LLC, February 2013. ASIN B00BCCW6PC Audiobook.)

=== Journals ===
Ray has written for a number of journals, including The Humanist, a publication of the American Humanist Association.

=== Podcast ===
Ray's podcast, Secular Sexuality addresses human sexuality from an atheist or freethinker's viewpoint. It is produced by Secular Media Group, LLC, an atheist media and publishing company.

- Secular Sexuality with Dr. Darrel Ray (2014)
