= Secular Therapy Project =

The Secular Therapy Project
- Formation: April 2012
- Founder: Dr. Darrel Ray
- Type: 501(c)(3) non-profit organization
- Purpose: Connecting non-religious or secular persons who need mental health services with outstanding mental health professionals.
- Director: Please see www.seculartherapy.org/psych-team
- Website: www.seculartherapy.org

The Secular Therapy Project, sometimes abbreviated to STP, is a 501(c)(3) non-profit organization founded in 2012 by Dr. Darrel Ray as part of its parent project, Recovering from Religion.

The aim of the organisation is "to help connect non-religious or secular persons who need mental health services with outstanding mental health professionals, such as psychologists, psychiatrists, counselors, clinical social workers, and others."

== History ==
In 2011 and early 2012, during a book tour for his book Sex and God, psychologist Dr. Darrel Ray was contacted by many people sharing stories of therapists using religious or spiritual techniques rather than scientific methods. Ray learned of the difficulties in finding therapists using evidence-based techniques in the United States, speculating that such therapists avoided advertising themselves as atheist or humanist because it might drive away religious clients. To provide a solution to this problem, in April 2012, RfR launched the "Secular Therapist Project", a service using only secular therapists.

Just over a year after the launch, in August 2013, the project had reached a key milestone of 2000 registered clients. In 2016, Ray stepped down as director of the project to focus on projects with Recovering from Religion, and made way for Dr. Caleb Lack, a Professor of Psychology at the University of Central Oklahoma.

In September 2017, RfR updated the project's name to the Secular Therapy Project, launched a brand new website and database, and revealed that over 10,000 clients had found secular therapists in the five years since the organisation's launch.

== Services ==
The organization provides services for both registered psychotherapists and potential clients: for clients, the website is a database of therapists who use scientific and secular methods to treat their patients; for therapists, it's a way to discreetly offer those services without their wider client base – which is often heavily religious – finding out. According to the organization's website, "therapists are not free to advertise that they are secular without endangering their practice or their families."

In vetting potential therapists for the database, the organization uses a three-step process, ensuring the therapists are licensed professionals, are using evidence-based practices, and are themselves secular.

For clients, the organization maintains confidentiality by requiring clients to only give minimal information upon registration – an email address, a country of residence, and a zip code – and allows clients to contact therapists through the website with this basic information. Clients are then free to contact their chosen therapists outside of the website in order to proceed with sessions.

== Response ==
The organization has won several proponents since it launched in 2012, most notably from professional psychologists. Dr. Ann Lane, a secular psychotherapist, praised the project, claiming that evidence-based practices are beneficial to the most people: "Everyone can benefit from psychological strategies aimed at altering negative patterns of thinking, improving communication skills, overcoming difficulties in decision making, setting effective goals, proper time management and improving organization."

Matthew May, assistant professor of sociology at Oakland University, undertook a study which demonstrated that individuals who consider leaving their faith but, for whatever reason, do not end up doing so, are more prone to depression. He claimed that "we haven’t given much attention to the people who think about leaving and decide to stay", and instability caused by failing to match the expectations of those around us causes "distress". May's comments were taken by STP Director Caleb Lack as validation for the work of the project.
