= Freethought Festival =

Annual student-run freethinking convention

- Genre: freethought, skepticism, atheism, and science
- Venue: Gordon Dining and Event Center, Symphony Room (2016)
- Location: Madison, WI
- Inaugurated: 2012
- Founder: Chris Calvey
- Website: www.freethoughtfestival.org

Freethought Festival is a student-run freethinking convention held annually in Madison, Wisconsin by the student group Atheists, Humanists, and Agnostics at the University of Wisconsin–Madison. Speakers give talks relating to atheism, freethinking, skepticism, and other topics.

== Description ==
The Freethought Festival is a free, student-run secular conference held annually in Madison, Wisconsin. It is organized and hosted by Atheists, Humanists, and Agnostics (AHA) @ UW-Madison. Authors, bloggers, activists, and scientists from around the country come to speak on secular and scientific issues. The event is funded by AHA through an annual operations budget received from the University of Wisconsin-Madison.

== Past Festivals ==
Dates	Location	Venue	Attendance	Speakers
April 27–29, 2012	UW-Madison	Humanities 3650	310	Richard Carrier, PZ Myers, Matt Dillahunty, Ellery Schempp, JT Eberhard, D. J. Grothe, Hemant Mehta, Darrel Ray, Annie Laurie Gaylor, Andrew Seidel, Dale McGowan, Veronica Drantz, Chris Calvey, Elliott Sober, Valerie Tarico, Phil Ferguson, Lyz Liddell, James Croft, Alix Jules
March 8–10, 2013	UW-Madison	Lowell Center	330	Dan Barker, JT Eberhard, Eugenie Scott, Hemant Mehta, Darrel Ray. Amanda Knief, Dale McGowan, Annie Laurie Gaylor, Andrew Seidel, Greta Christina, Chris Calvey, Jesse Galef, Debbie Goddard, Desiree Schell, Katherine Stewart, Kathy Goodman
April 11 & 12, 2014	UW-Madison	Varsity Hall (Union South) & Social Sciences 6210	550	Dan Savage, Jamie Kilstein, Dan Barker, Dale McGowan, Hemant Mehta, Annie Laurie Gaylor, Jay Rosenstein, Matthew Slick
March 13-15, 2015	UW-Madison	DeLuca Forum, Wisconsin Institutes for Discovery	180	Susan Jacoby, Jamie Kilstein, Lindsey Doe, James Croft, Heina Dadabhoy, Candace Gorham, Debbie Goddard, Andrew Seidel, Patrick Elliott, Ed Brayton
April 8-9, 2016	UW-Madison	Symphony Room, Gordon Dining Hall & Events Center		James Randi, Eugenie Scott, Faisal Saeed Al Mutar, Indre Viskontas, Heina Dadabhoy, Frank and Dan from the Thank God I'm Atheist podcast, Charles Cohen, Katie Klabusich, Tommy Nugent, Howard Schweber, Andrew Seidel, Peter Zupan
