= List of atheist activists and educators =

There have been many atheists who have been active in advocacy or education. This is a list of atheist activists and educators. Living persons in this list are people whose atheism is relevant to their notable activities or public life, and who have publicly identified themselves as atheists.

== Atheist activists and educators ==
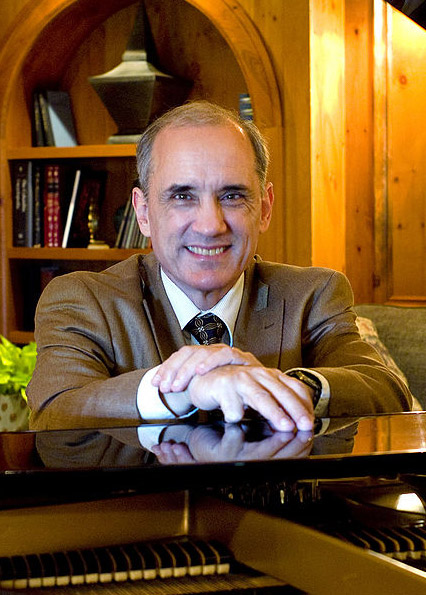
Barker

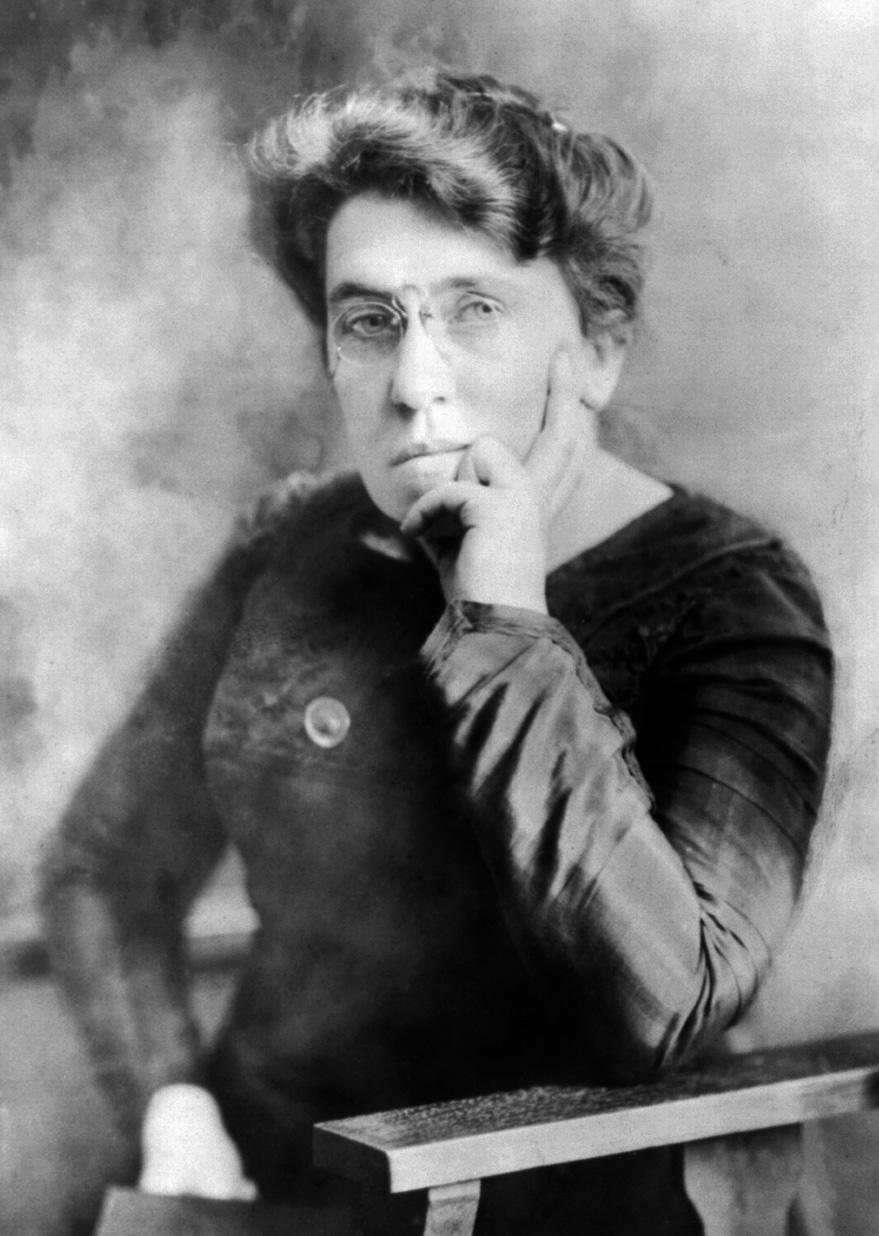
Goldman

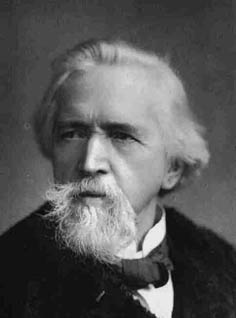
Holyoake

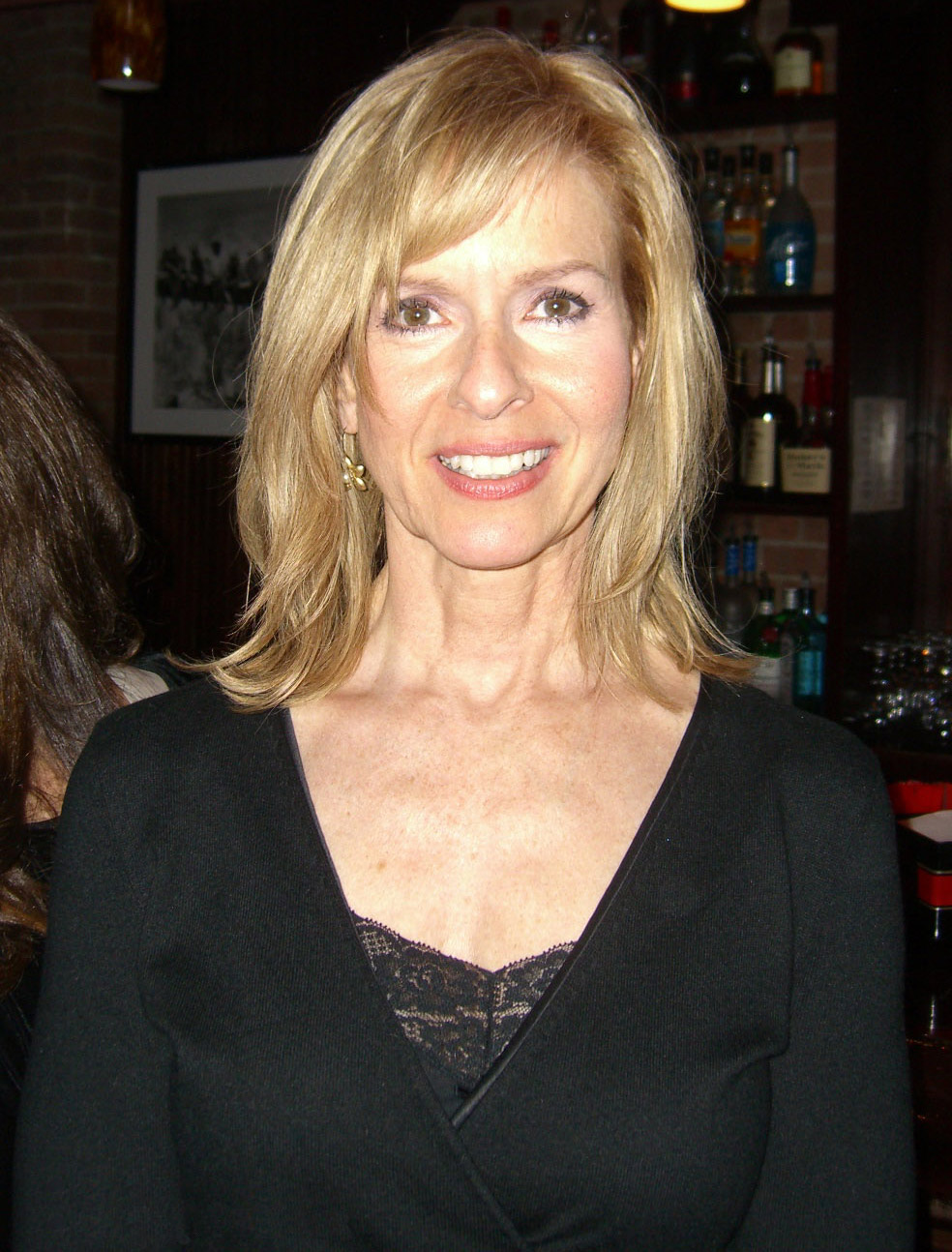
Johnson

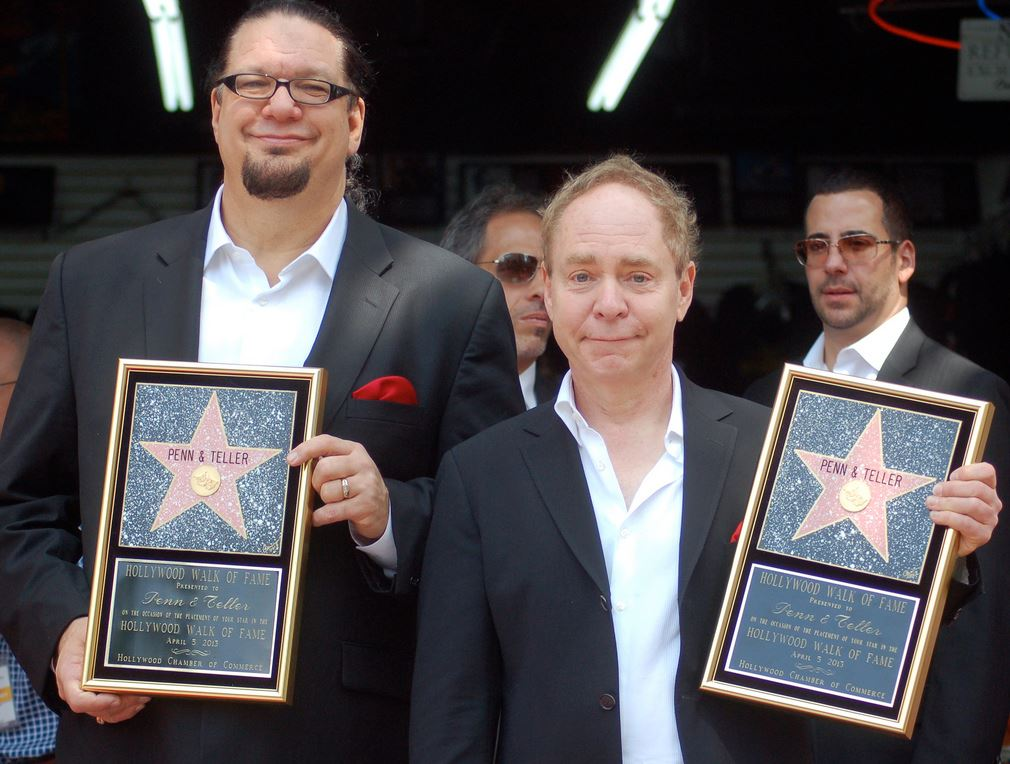
Penn and Teller

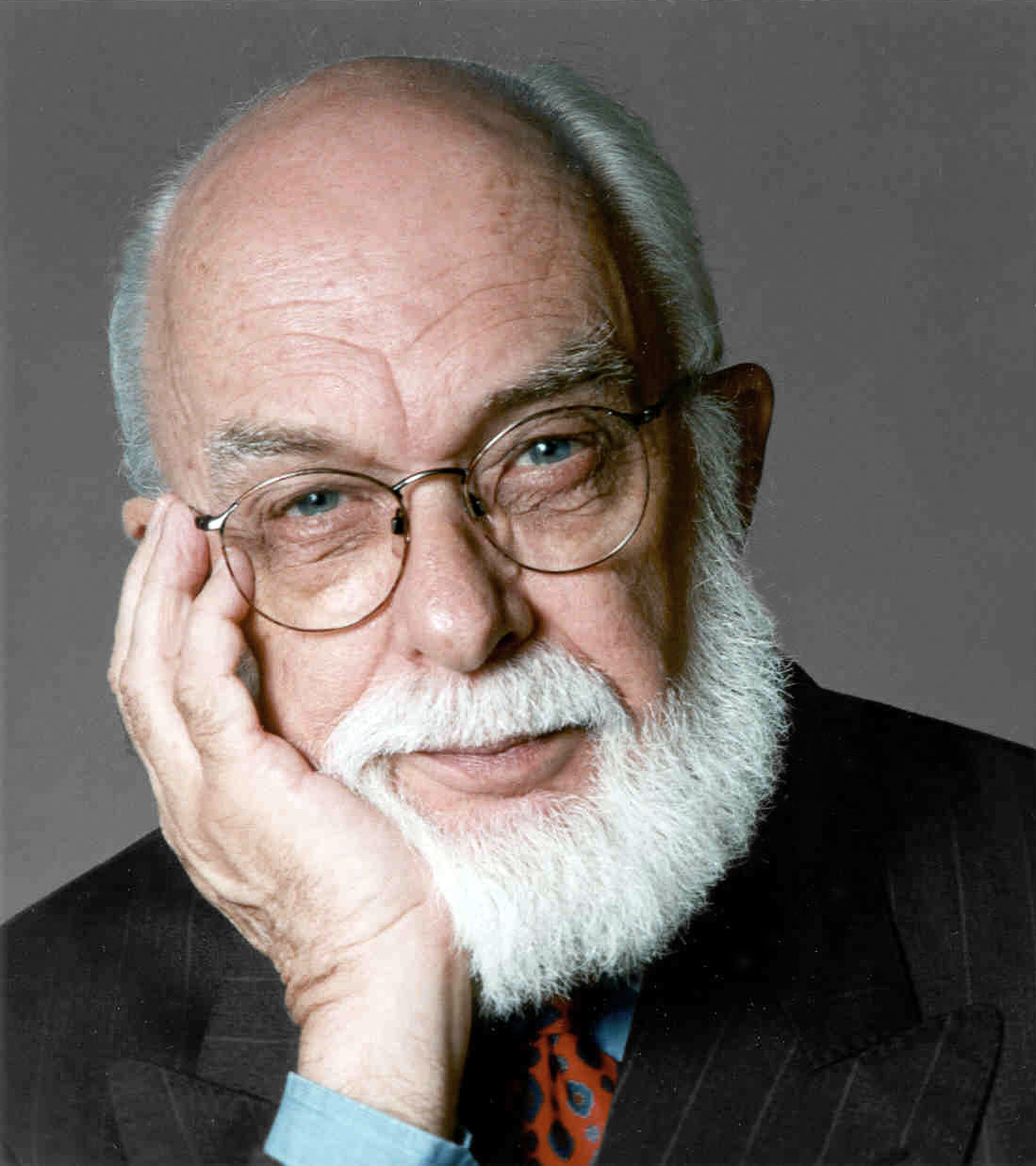
Randi

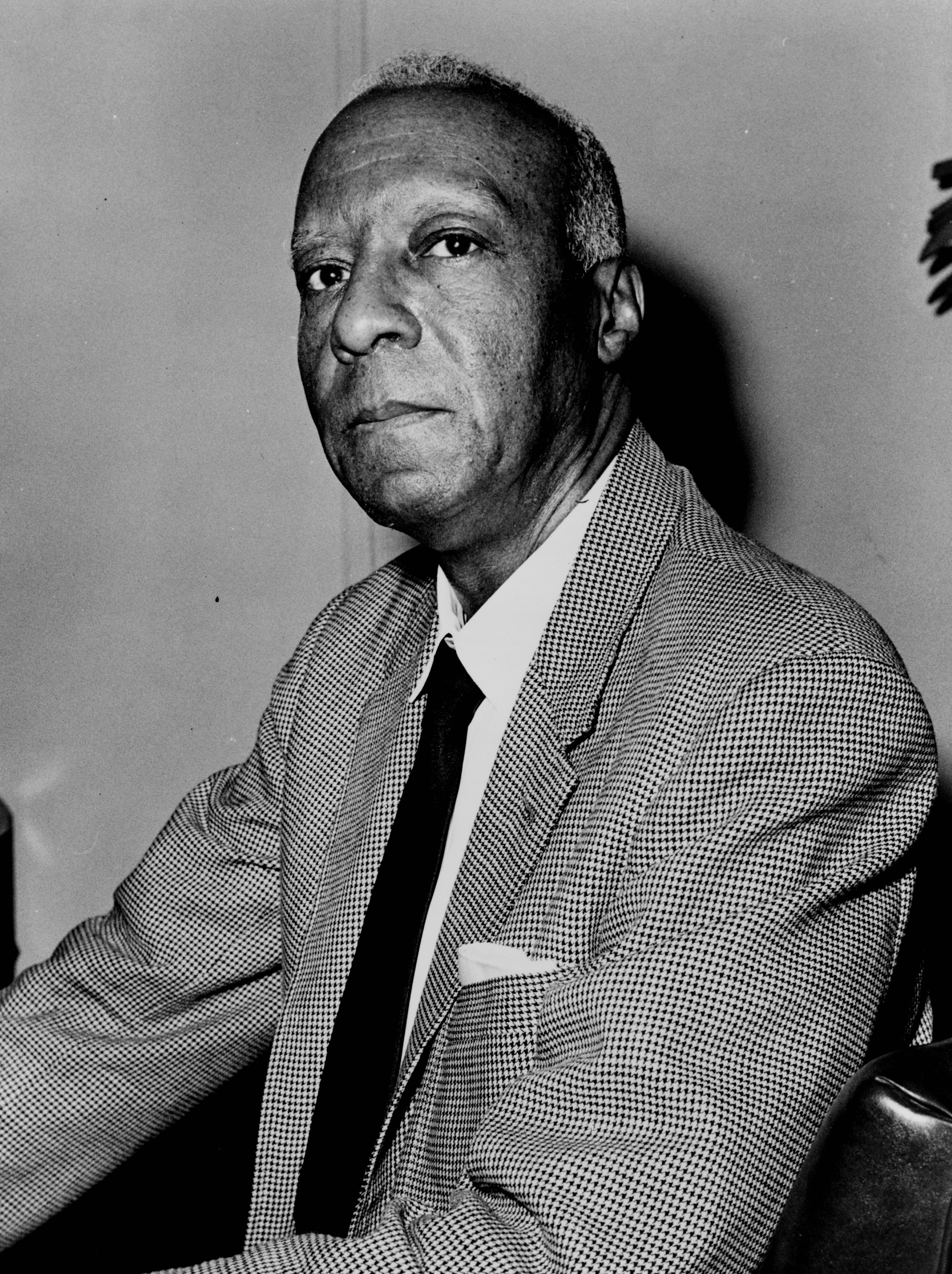
Randolph

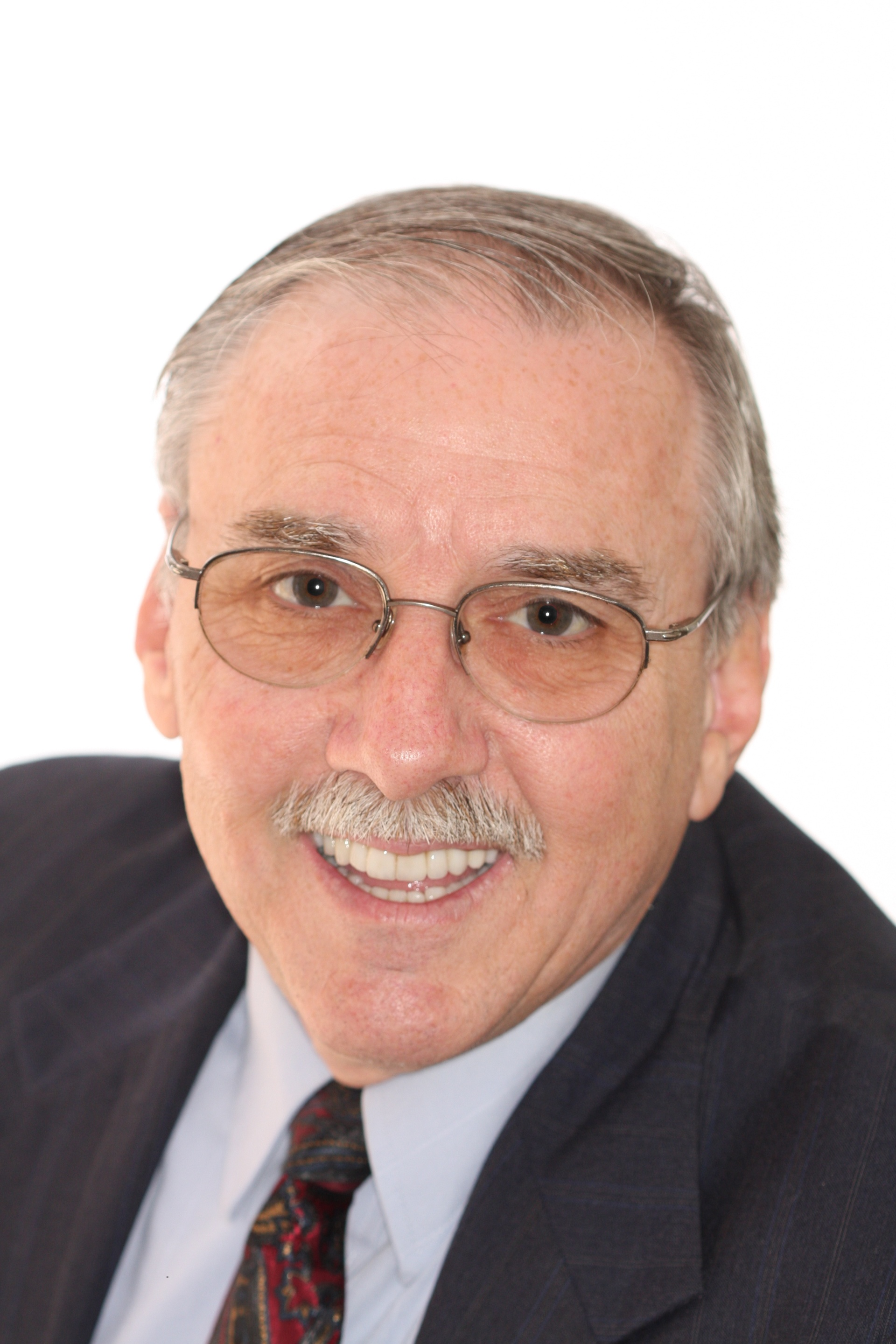
Ray

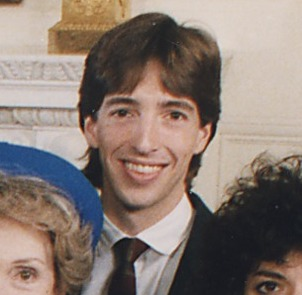
Ron Reagan

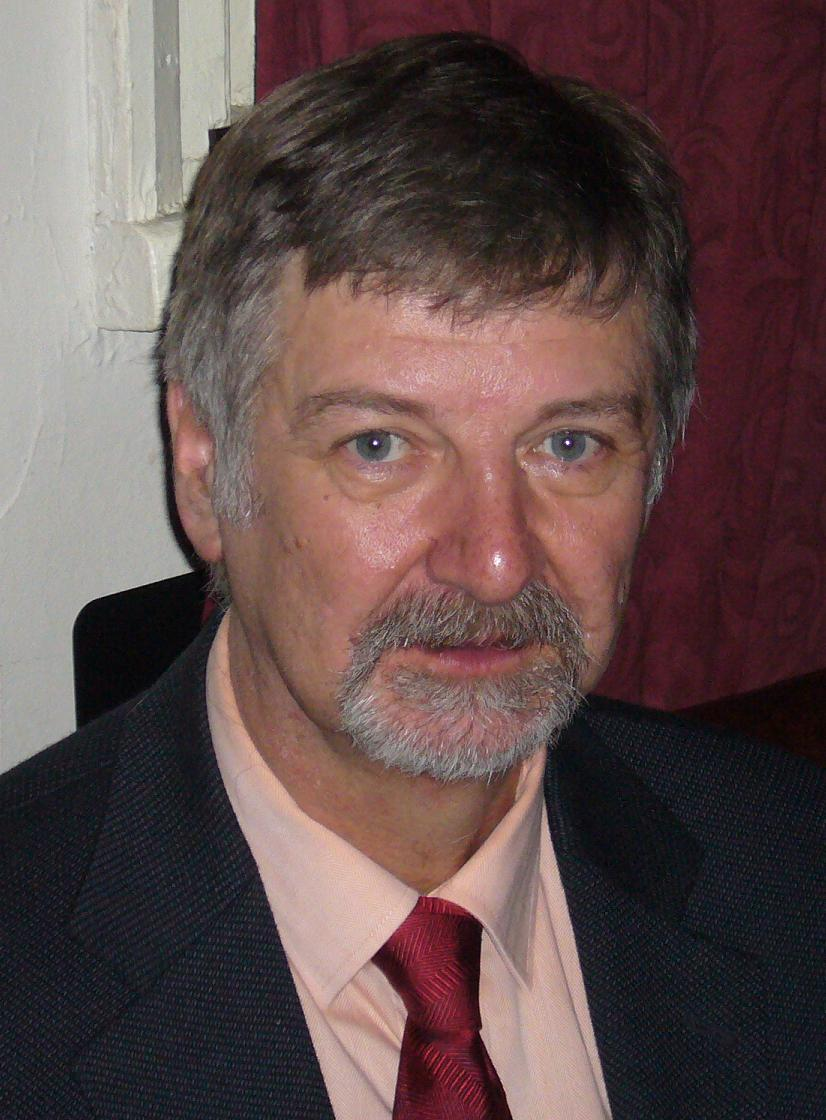
Sanderson

- Clark Adams (1969–2007): prominent American freethought leader and activist.
- Seth Andrews (born 1968): American author and host of The Thinking Atheist radio podcast.
- Natalie Angier (born 1958): nonfiction writer and science journalist for The New York Times; 1991 winner of Pulitzer Prize for Beat Reporting.
- Dan Barker (born 1949): American atheist activist, current co-president of the Freedom From Religion Foundation, alongside his wife, Annie Laurie Gaylor.
- Peter Brearey (1939–1998): British secularist, socialist and journalist, Editor of The Freethinker from 1993 until his death.
- William Montgomery Brown (1855–1937): Episcopal bishop and Communist author.
- Richard Carlile (1790–1843): English activist. He was an important agitator for the establishment of universal suffrage and freedom of the press in the United Kingdom.
- Richard Carrier (born 1969): American author, public speaker, and atheist activist.
- Robin Cavendish (1930–1994): British disability rights advocate, a pioneering developer of medical aids for the paralyzed, and known for being one of the longest-lived "responauts" in Britain.
- Greta Christina (born 1961): American blogger, speaker, and author.
- Chapman Cohen (1868–1954): English freethought writer and lecturer, and an editor of The Freethinker and president of the National Secular Society.
- Matt Dillahunty (born 1969): former president of the Atheist Community of Austin until May, 2013. He is a former host of the live internet radio show "Non-Prophets Radio" and of the Austin Public-access television cable TV show The Atheist Experience. He is also the founder and contributor of the counter-apologetics encyclopedia Iron Chariots and its subsidiary sites.
- Margaret Downey (born 1950): atheist activist who is a former President of Atheist Alliance International.
- Joseph Edamaruku (1934–2006): Indian journalist, author, leader in the rationalist movement, and winner of the International Atheist Award in 1979.
- Sanal Edamaruku (born 1955): Indian rationalist, president of the Indian Rationalist Association.
- Reginald V. Finley, Sr., (born 1974): ("The Infidel Guy"): internet radio host and pioneering podcaster based in Atlanta, Georgia, co-founder of the Atheist Network and founder of FreethoughtMedia.com. Mr. Finley is a lifetime educational activist, critical thinker, humanist and atheist. During his show's tenure (1999–2010), he produced over 500 media programs that challenged his listeners as well as himself. He's also well known for his appearance on ABC's Wife Swap (2005) when his spouse (Amber Finley) swapped places with a fundamentalist pastor's wife, Kelly Stonerock.
- Stephen Fry (born 1957): English actor and media commentator. Fry has frequently expressed opposition to organised religion in the media. In 2010, he was made a Distinguished Supporter of the British Humanist Association.
- Annie Laurie Gaylor (born 1955): co-founder of the Freedom From Religion Foundation and, with her husband Dan Barker, is the current co-president.
- Emma Goldman (1869–1940): Lithuanian-born radical, known for her writings and speeches defending anarchist communism, feminism, and atheism.
- Debbie Goddard (born 1980): Director of African Americans for Humanism.
- Gora (1902–1975): Indian atheist leader, co-founder with his wife of the Atheist Centre in Andhra Pradesh.
- Saraswathi Gora (1912–2006): Indian social activist, wife of Gora and leader of the Atheist Centre for many years, campaigning against untouchability and the caste system.
- John William Gott (1866–1922): English trouser salesman and leader of the Freethought Socialist League, the last person in Britain to be sent to prison for blasphemy.
- E. Haldeman-Julius (1889–1951): American author, editor and publisher of the Little Blue Books series
- Erkki Hartikainen (1942–2021): Finnish atheist activist. He is the chairman of the Atheist Association of Finland (Suomen Ateistiyhdistys) and former chairman of the Union of Freethinkers of Finland (Vapaa-ajattelijoiden liitto), the biggest atheistic association in Finland.
- Rebecca Hensler: founder of Grief Beyond Belief, a support group for grieving people who do not believe in God or an afterlife, which she founded in 2011.
- Christopher Hitchens (1949–2011): British-American columnist, polemicist, and free-thought activist. Author of New York Times best seller God is not Great - How Religion Poisons Everything.
- George Holyoake (1817–1906): English secularist. Holyoake was the last person in England to be imprisoned (in 1842) for being an atheist. He coined the term "secularism" in 1846.
- Penn Jillette (born 1955): one half of debunking illusionist team Penn & Teller
- Ellen Johnson: President of American Atheists, 1995–2008.
- Edwin Kagin (1940–2014): lawyer, activist, founder of the Camp Quest secular summer camp, and American Atheists' Kentucky State Director.
- Paul Kurtz (1925–2012): Professor Emeritus of Philosophy at the State University of New York at Buffalo, best known for his prominent role in the United States humanist and skeptical communities.
- Viktor Emanuel Lennstrand (1861–1895): leader of the Swedish Freethought movement in the 1880s and early 1890s.
- Joseph Lewis (1889–1968): American freethinker and atheist, president of Freethinkers of America 1920–1968.
- Hemant Mehta (born c.1983): author of I Sold My Soul on eBay, chair of the Secular Student Alliance and author of the blog FriendlyAtheist.com.
- William L. Moore (1927–1963): postal worker and Congress of Racial Equality (CORE) member who staged lone protests against racial segregation. He was murdered on his final protest.
- Maryam Namazie (born 1963): human rights activist, commentator and broadcaster. Namazie has served as the executive director of the International Federation of Iranian Refugees. She is spokesperson for the One Law for All Campaign against Sharia Law in Britain.
- Michael Newdow (born 1953): American physician and attorney, who sued a school district on the grounds that its requirement that children recite the U.S. Pledge of Allegiance, containing the words "under God", breached the separation-of-church-and-state provision in the establishment clause of the United States Constitution.
- Michael Nugent (born 1961): Irish writer and activist, chairperson of Atheist Ireland.
- Madalyn Murray O'Hair (1919–1995): founder of American Atheists, campaigner for the separation of church and state; filed the lawsuit that led the US Supreme Court to ban teacher-led prayer and Bible reading in public schools. Murdered September 1995.
- Robert L. Park (1931–2020): scientist, University of Maryland professor of physics, and author of Voodoo Science and Superstition.
- Philip K. Paulson (1947–2006): American plaintiff in a series of lawsuits to remove a Christian cross from a prominent summit in the city of San Diego.
- Herman Philipse (born 1951): professor of philosophy at Utrecht University, the Netherlands and University of Oxford, United Kingdom, writer of Atheistisch manifest & De onredelijkheid van religie
- James Randi (1928–2020): magician, paranormal investigator, and founder of the James Randi Educational Foundation.
- A. Philip Randolph (1889–1979): African-American leader during the Civil Rights Movement.
- Darrel Ray (born 1950): psychologist, author, and founder of Recovering from Religion and the Secular Therapy Project.
- Ron Reagan (born 20 May 1958): In a 23 June 2004 interview on the CNN show Larry King Live, while discussing reasons why he would not run for political office, Ron Reagan stated: "I'm an atheist... I can't be elected to anything because polls all say that people won't elect an atheist."
- J. M. Robertson (1856–1933): Scottish journalist, advocate of rationalism and secularism, social reformer and Liberal Member of Parliament.
- Terry Sanderson (1946–2022): British secularist and gay rights activist, author and journalist, President of the National Secular Society since 2006.
- Ellery Schempp (born 1940): American physicist and church-state separation activist.
- Ariane Sherine (born 1980): English comedy writer and journalist. She created the UK version of the Atheist Bus Campaign, which ran in January 2009. She lives in London.
- Charles Lee Smith (1887–1964): atheist activist in the United States and an editor of the Truth Seeker until his death. He also founded the American Association for the Advancement of Atheism. Smith was arrested twice in 1928 for selling atheist literature and for blasphemy. Since he refused to swear an oath to God on the Bible, he was not allowed to testify in his own defense.
- Barbara Smoker (1923–2020): British humanist activist and freethought advocate. Wrote the book Freethoughts: Atheism, Secularism, Humanism – Selected Egotistically from The Freethinker.
- Teller (magician) (born 1948): one half of debunking illusionist team Penn & Teller
- Mandisa Thomas (living): founder and president of Black Nonbelievers Inc, which she founded in 2011.
- Polly Toynbee (born 1946): British journalist, columnist for The Guardian.
- Nicolas Walter (1934–2000): British anarchist and atheist writer, speaker and activist."Mr Walter is a third-generation atheist, very proud that his grandparents, on both sides, shrugged off various forms of Protestantism. His father was W Grey Walter, the eminent neurologist, who often appeared on The Brains Trust. "He was a left-wing humanist and believed that science could solve everything." " Hunter Davies interviewing Walter, 'O come all ye faithless: Nicolas Walter, a militant atheist, sees no reason to celebrate Christmas. But he'll still be singing a carol or two', The Independent
- Keith Porteous Wood (born 1948): Executive Director, formerly General Secretary, of the National Secular Society in the United Kingdom.

== Other activists and educators ==
People who are/were activists or educators in other areas (social reform, feminism etc), but who were also atheists.

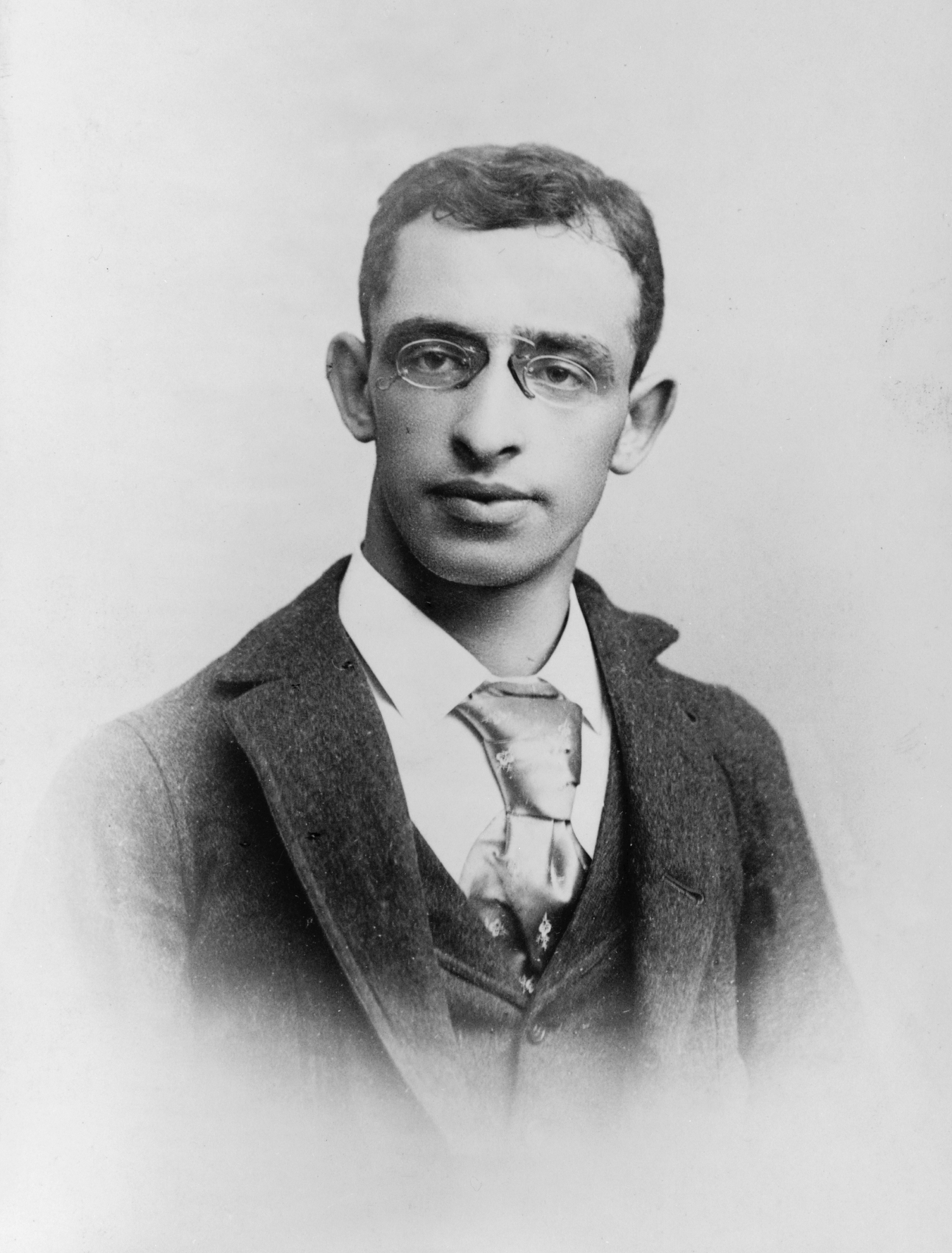
Berkman

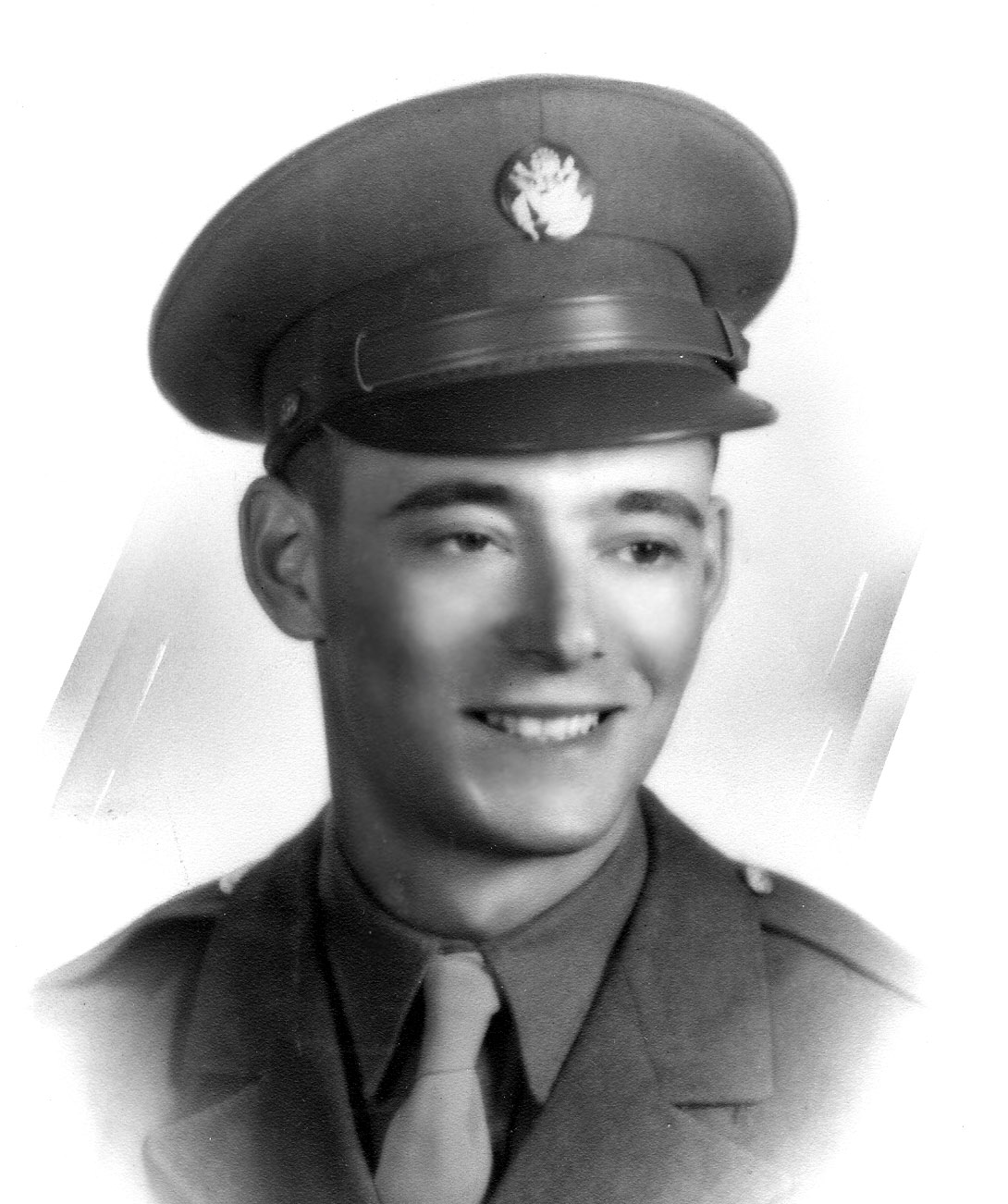
Ettinger

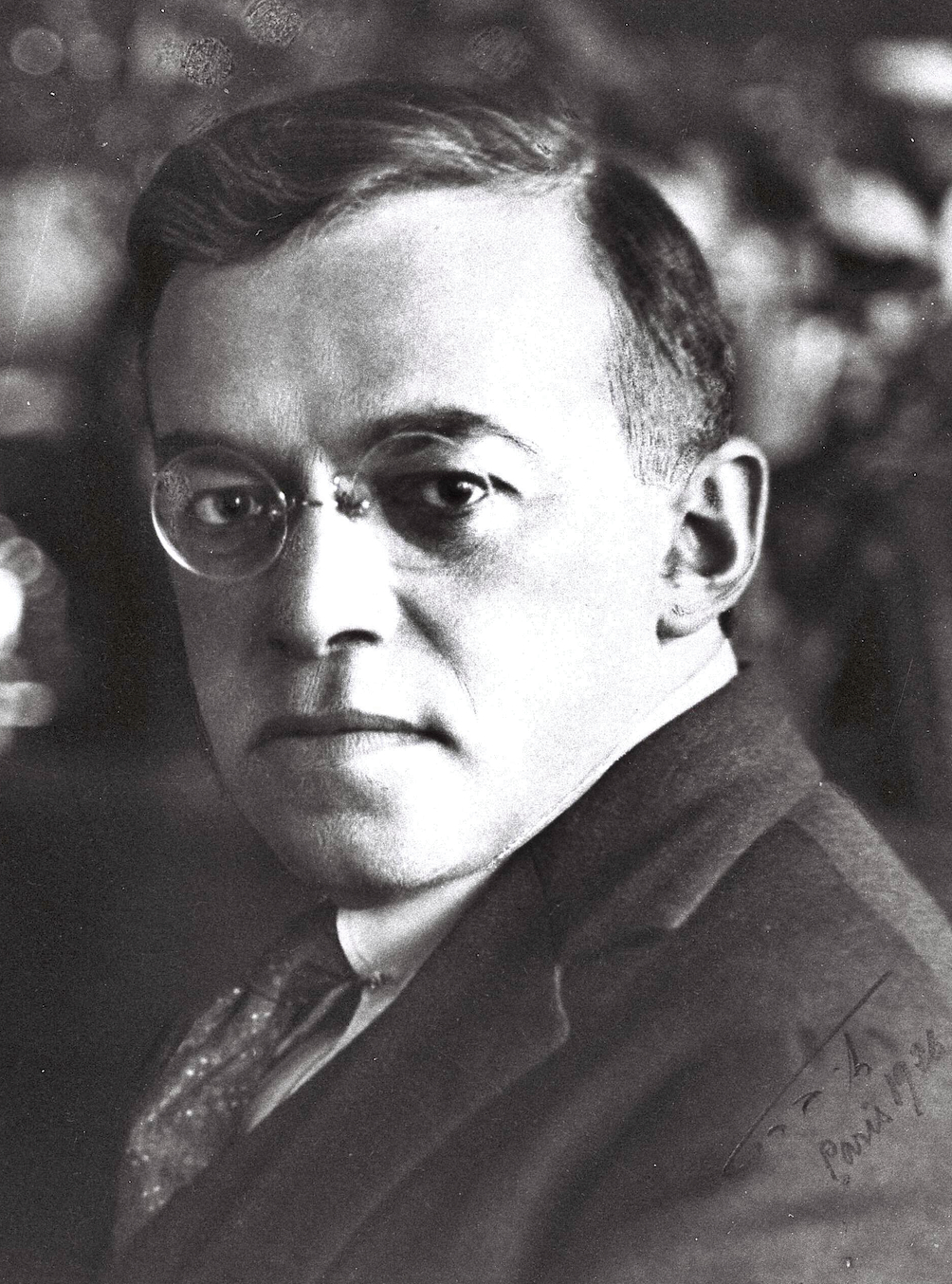
Jabotinsky

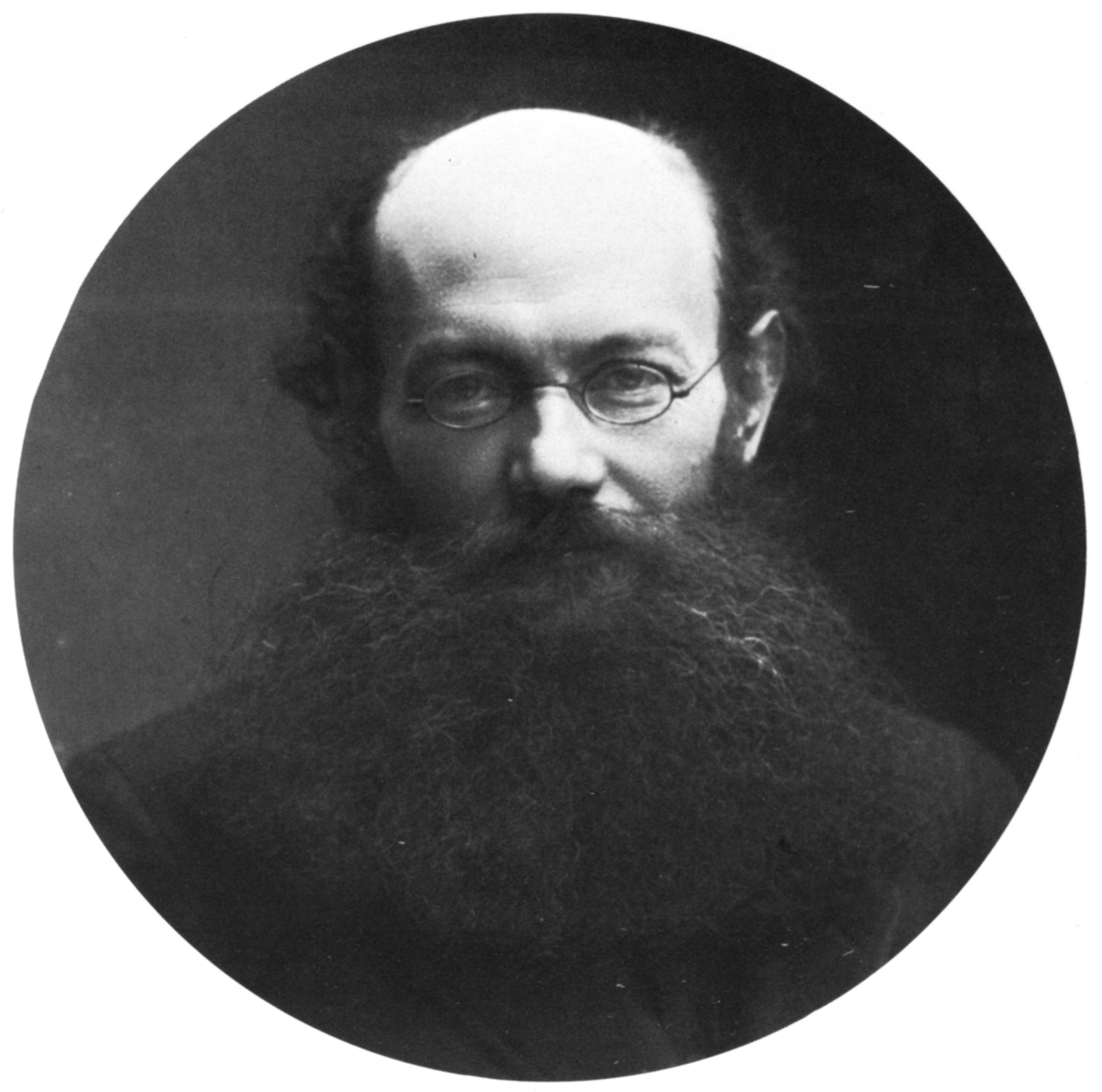
Kropotkin

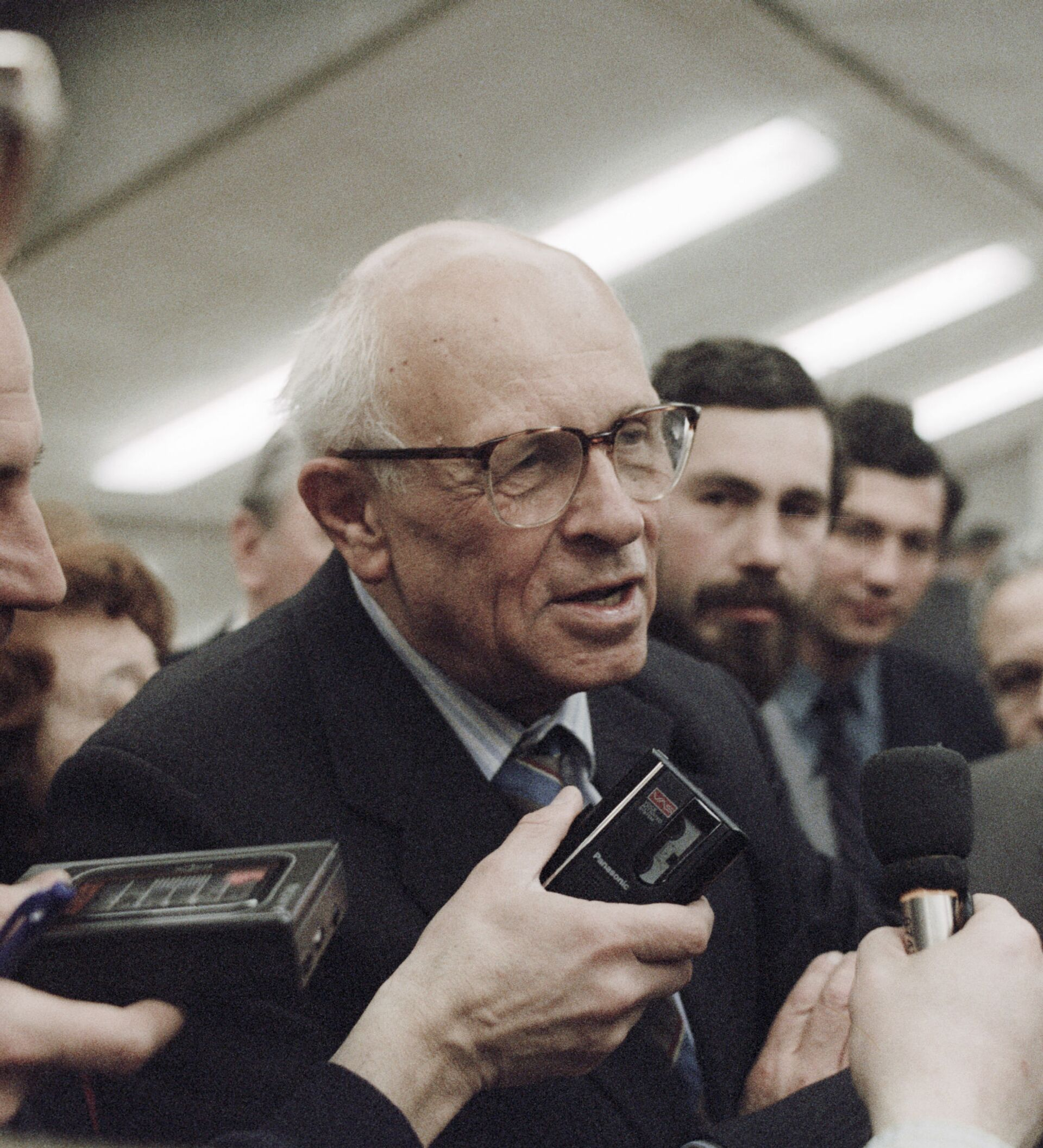
Sakharov

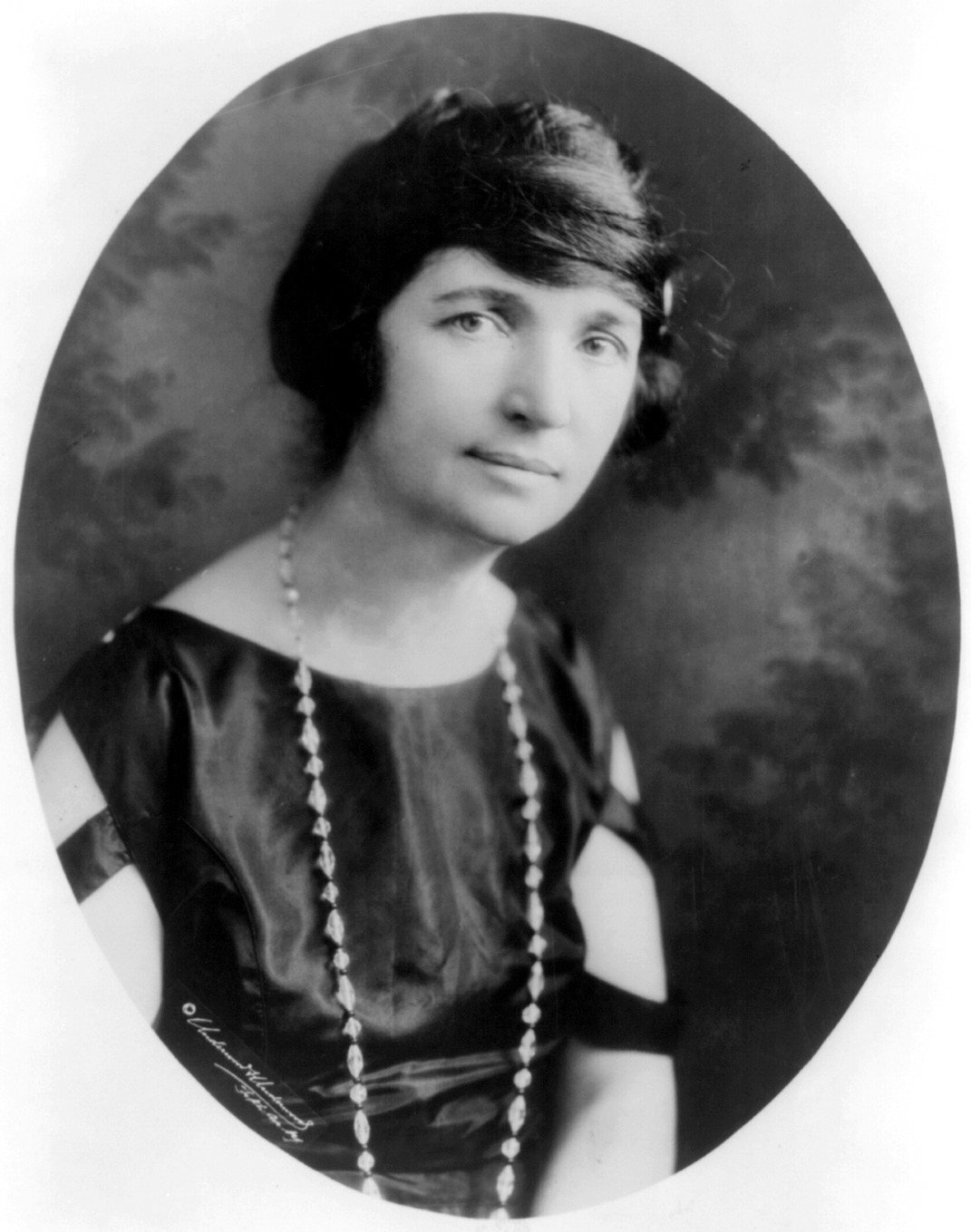
Sanger

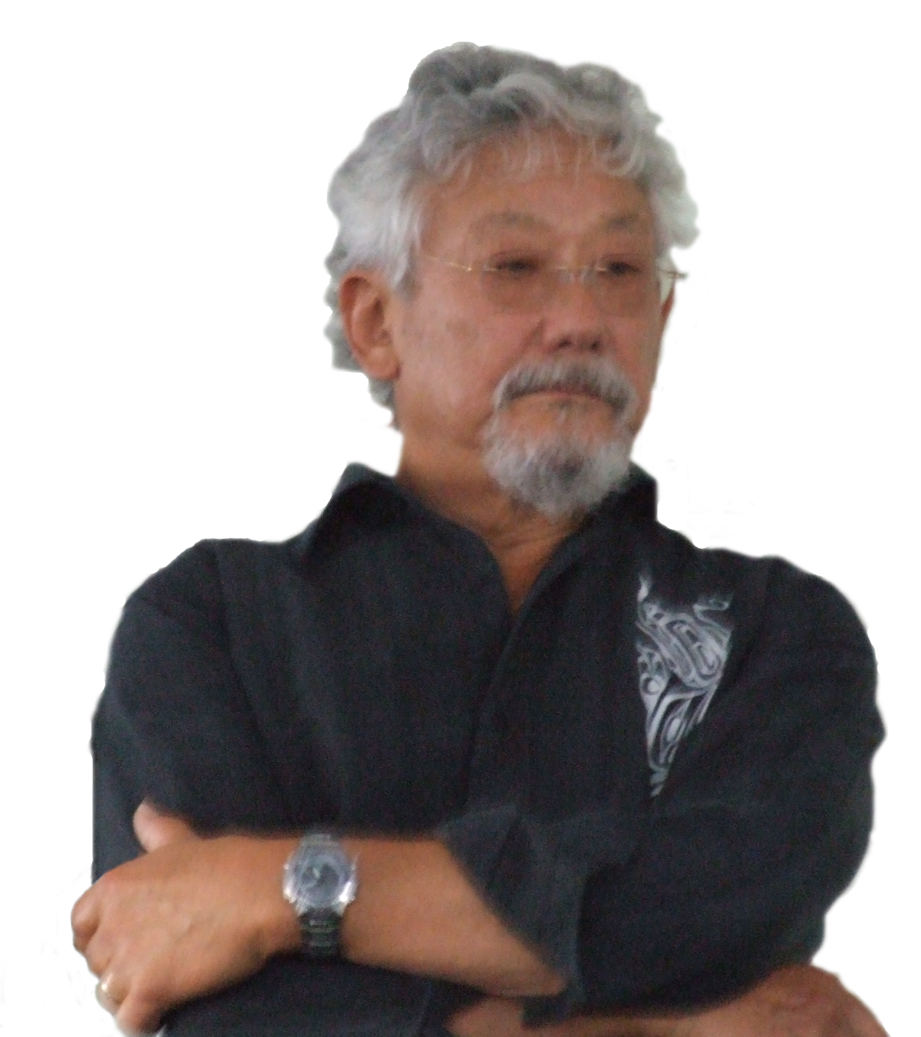
Suzuki

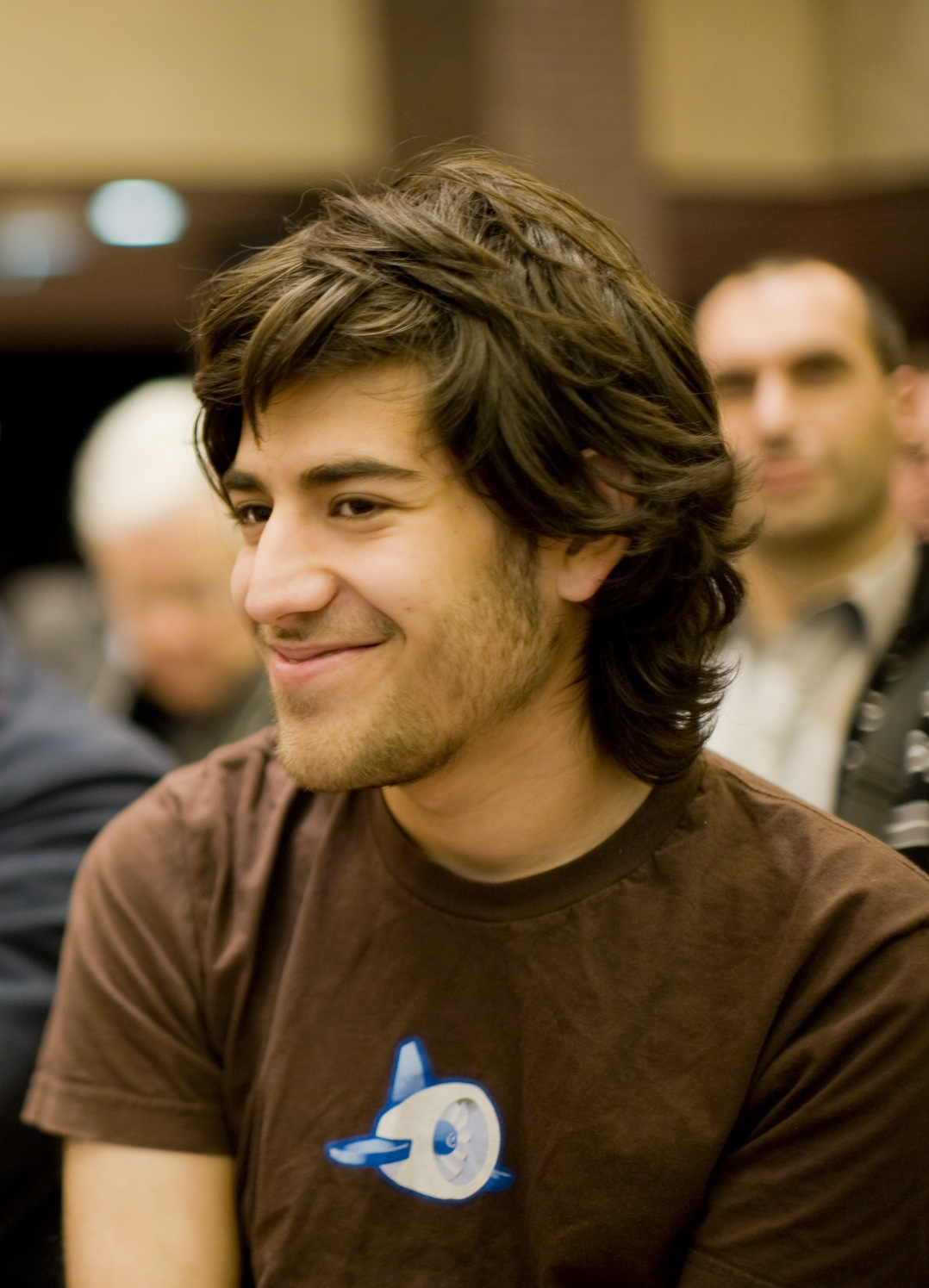
Swartz

- Pietro Acciarito (1871–1943): Italian anarchist activist who attempted to assassinate King Umberto I.
- Zackie Achmat (born 1962): South African anti-HIV/AIDS activist; founder of the Treatment Action Campaign.
- Baba Amte (1914–2008): respected Indian social activist, known for his work with lepers.
- Julian Assange (born 1971): Australian publisher, journalist, media and internet entrepreneur, media critic, writer, computer programmer and political/internet activist.
- Alexander Berkman (1870–1936): anarchist known for his political activism and writing. He was a leading member of the anarchist movement in the early 20th century. While living in France, Berkman continued his work in support of the anarchist movement, producing the classic exposition of anarchist principles, Now and After: The ABC of Communist Anarchism.
- Walter Block (born 1941): Austrian School economist and classical liberal
- Richard Dawkins (born 1941): British biologist, author of The God Delusion, The Greatest Show on Earth, Climbing Mount Improbable, Unweaving the Rainbow, A Devil's Chaplain, The Ancestor's Tale, The Blind Watchmaker, The Extended Phenotype, River Out of Eden, and The Selfish Gene. Founder of the Richard Dawkins Foundation for Reason and Science, a non–profit charitable organization that promotes critical thinking, science-based education, and evidence–based understanding of the world. Richard Dawkins has produced several documentaries, including Root of all Evil? and Enemies of Reason.
- Robert Ettinger (1918–2011): American academic, known as "the father of cryonics" because of the impact of his 1962 book The Prospect of Immortality.
- David D. Friedman (born 1945): Economist, law professor, novelist, and libertarian activist.
- Abbie Hoffman (1936–1989): American political and social activist.
- Ze'ev Jabotinsky (1880–1940): Revisionist Zionist (nationalist) leader, author, orator, activist, soldier, and founder of the Jewish Self-Defense Organization in Odessa.
- Franklin E. Kameny (1925–2011): American gay rights activist and former astronomer.
- Adam Kokesh (born 1982): American libertarian anti-war activist and self-professed anarcho-capitalist.
- Peter Kropotkin (1842–1921): Russian anarchist communist activist and geographer, best known for his book, Mutual Aid: A Factor of Evolution, which refutes social Darwinism.
- Gustav Landauer (1870–1919): German anarchist and activist. He was one of the leading theorists on anarchism in Germany in the end of the 19th and the beginning of the 20th century. He was an advocate of social anarchism and an avowed pacifist.
- Taslima Nasrin (born 1962): Bangladeshi physician, writer, feminist human rights activist and secular humanist.
- Ingrid Newkirk (born 1949): British-born animal rights activist, author, and president and co-founder of People for the Ethical Treatment of Animals, the world's largest animal rights organization.
- Deng Pufang (born 1944): Chinese handicap people's rights activist, first son of China's former Paramount leader Deng Xiaoping.
- Ron Reagan (born 1958): American magazine journalist, board member of the politically activistic Creative Coalition, son of former U. S. President Ronald Reagan.
- Henry Stephens Salt (1851–1939): English writer and campaigner for social reform in the fields of prisons, schools, economic institutions and the treatment of animals, a noted anti-vivisectionist and pacifist, and a literary critic, biographer, classical scholar and naturalist, and the man who introduced Mahatma Gandhi to the influential works of Henry David Thoreau.
- Andrei Sakharov (1921–1989): Soviet nuclear physicist, dissident and human rights activist. He gained renown as the designer of the Soviet Union's Third Idea, a codename for Soviet development of thermonuclear weapons. Sakharov was an advocate of civil liberties and civil reforms in the Soviet Union. He was awarded the Nobel Peace Prize in 1975. The Sakharov Prize, which is awarded annually by the European Parliament for people and organizations dedicated to human rights and freedoms, is named in his honor.
- Margaret Sanger (1879–1966): American birth-control activist, founder of the American Birth Control League, a forerunner to Planned Parenthood. The masthead motto of her newsletter, The Woman Rebel, read: "No Gods, No Masters".
- Rosika Schwimmer (1877–1948): Hungarian-born pacifist, feminist and female suffragist.
- Bhagat Singh (1907–1931): Indian revolutionary freedom fighter.
- Marie Souvestre (1830–1905): French headmistress, a feminist educator who sought to develop independent minds in young women.
- David Suzuki (born 1936): Canadian academic, science broadcaster and environmental activist.
- Aaron Swartz (1986–2012): American computer programmer, writer, political organizer and Internet activist. Swartz was involved in the development of the web feed format RSS, the organization Creative Commons, the website framework web.py and the social news site Reddit, in which he was an equal partner after its merger with his Infogami company.
- Periyar (1879–1973): social activist and politician.

== Notes ==
a: A person permanently dependent upon a mechanical ventilator to maintain breathing.
