= Minnesota Atheists =

US non-profit organization

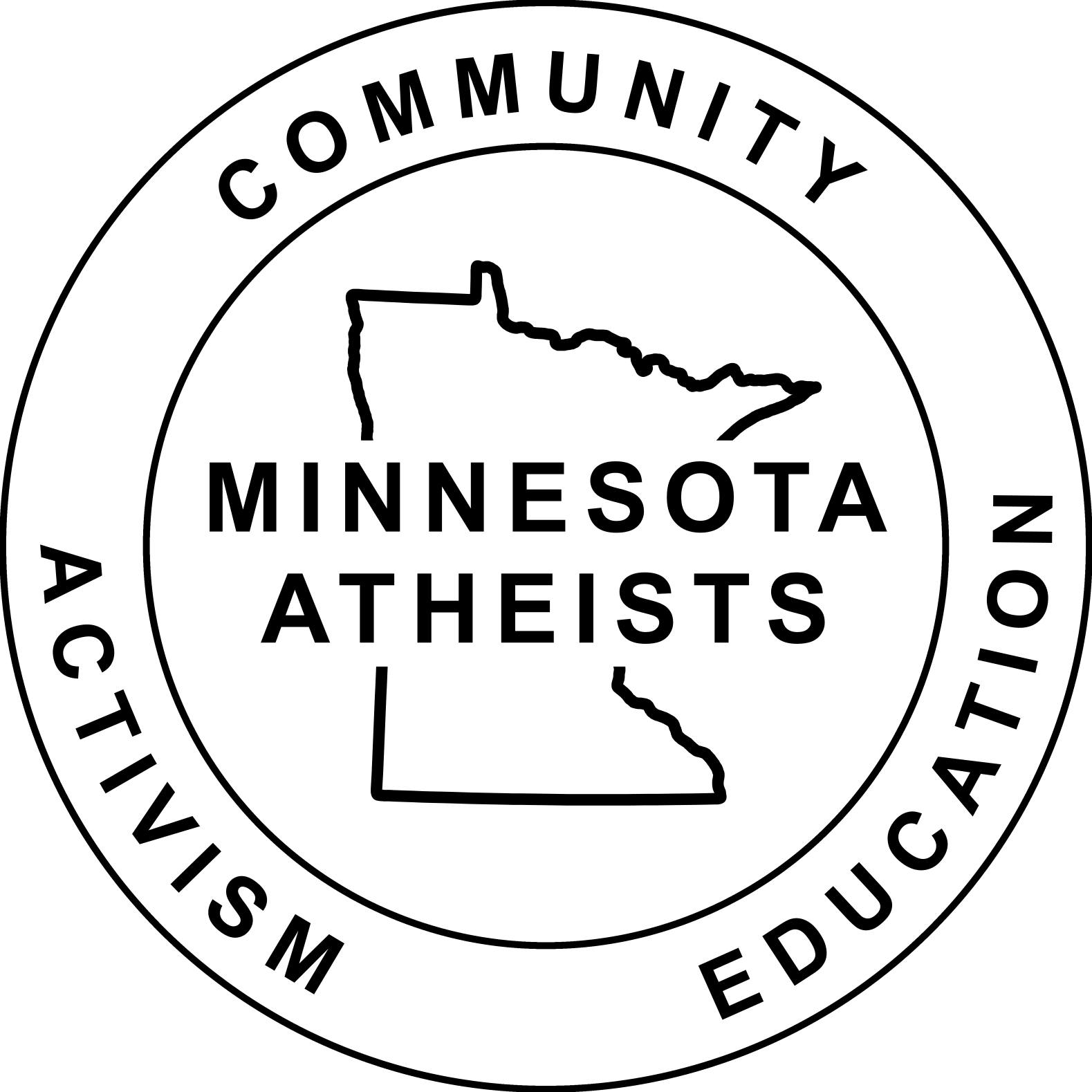
- Formation: 1991 Minnesota, U.S.
- Type: 501(c)(3)
- Purpose: Promotion of atheism, secular humanism, education
- Location: St. Paul/Minneapolis, Minnesota
- President: Ben Blanchard
- Website: www.mnatheists.org

Minnesota Atheists is a 501(c)(3) non-profit organization that seeks to promote the positive contributions of atheism and to maintain the separation of state and church and is the largest atheist organization in the state of Minnesota. It is affiliated with Atheist Alliance International, and the American Atheists. Minnesota Atheists is also part of the Alliance of Secular Humanist Societies, which is connected to the Council for Secular Humanism. The organization publishes a monthly newsletter, a weekly radio show and podcast called Atheists Talk, and a community access television show by the same name.

== History ==
Founded as the Twin Cities Chapter of American Atheists in 1984, Minnesota Atheists was founded in 1991 as a democratic organization of atheists. The Minnesota Atheists promote education and visibility in the community and responds to the push against atheism in the state of Minnesota. In 2013 the Foundation Beyond Belief awarded the "Humanist Communication Award" to the group for their work in 2012.

== Public outreach ==
=== Atheist Talk ===
Atheists Talk first aired January 13, 2008. The weekly program airs every Sunday Morning on AM 950 KTNF. Participants discuss areas of interest to the community including atheism, humanism, state/church separation, religion, ethics, science, and art. Guests include notable persons locally, nationally, and internationally including Ira Flatow, Neil DeGrasse Tyson, Richard Dawkins, and PZ Myers.

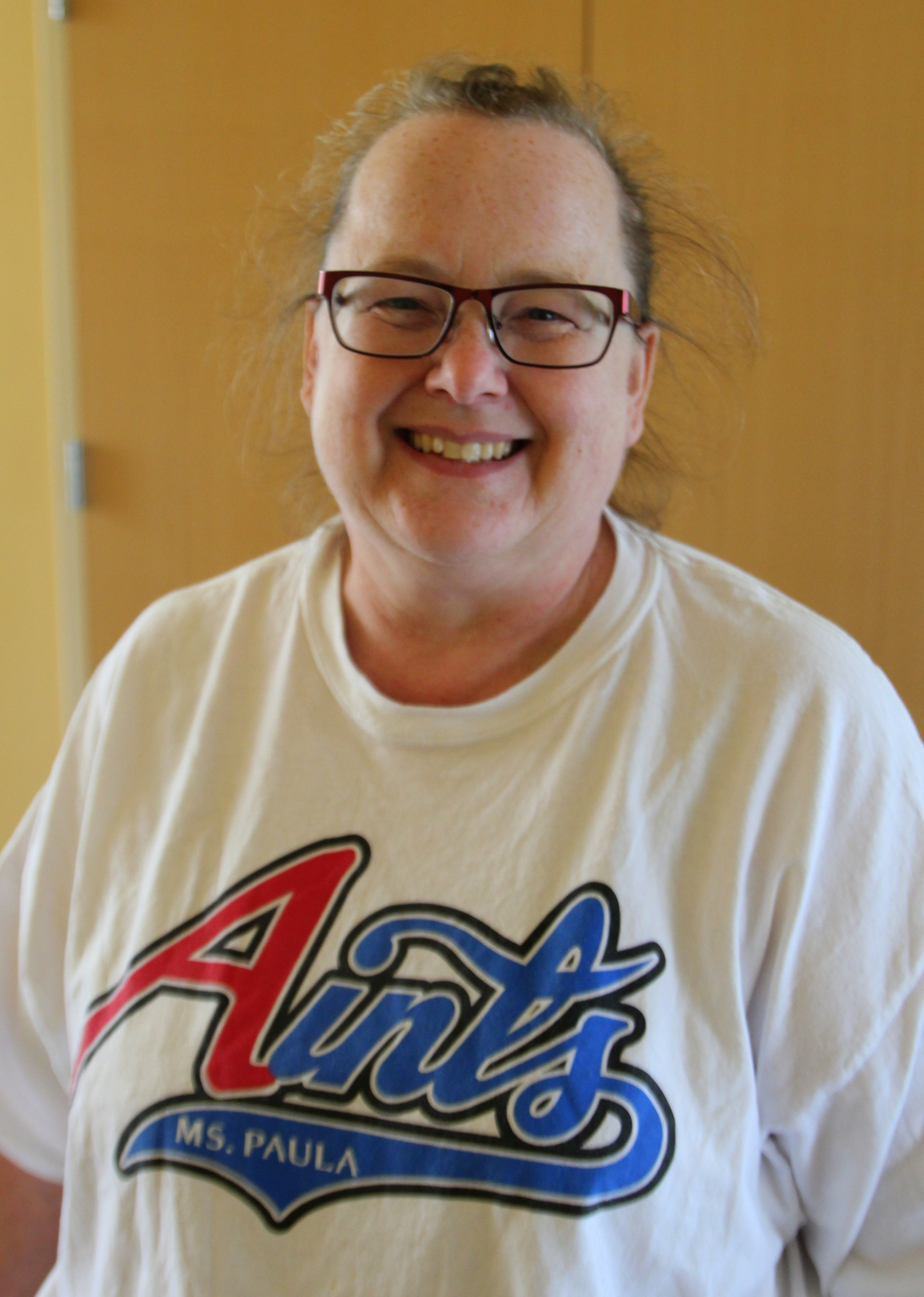
Nancy Bradshaw wears Aint T-shirt

=== Baseball game sponsorship ===
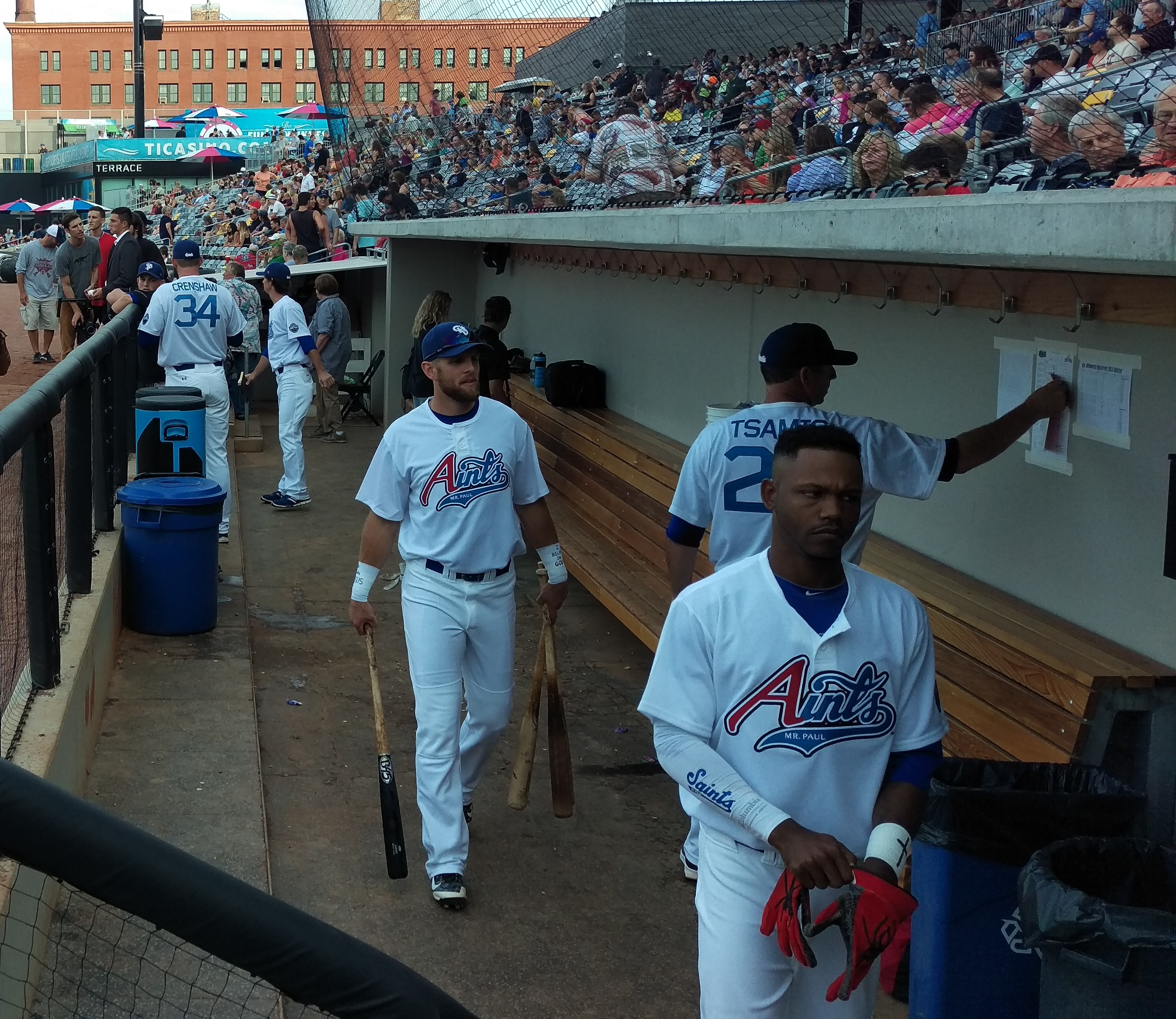
St. Paul Saints players wearing Mr. Paul Aints jerseys in dugout at CHS Field

In August 2012 the Minnesota Atheists partnered with the American Atheists to hold a regional conference and sponsor a St. Paul Saints game. The team changed their name to the secular-friendly "Mr. Paul Aints" as part of "A Night of Unbelievable Fun". The St. Paul Saints' general manager reported some complaints, mostly from out of state. A representative from the group stating that "sponsoring a baseball game seemed like a good way to show that apart from religion, atheists are like everybody else." A second game was sponsored by the Minnesota Atheists in 2013, "A Night of Unbelievable Fun, The Second Coming". The general manager states "We're looking forward to being an "Ain't" for the day." The Minnesota Atheists partnered with Foundation Beyond Belief in 2014 for the third atheist-themed St. Paul Saints game. It became the first game the secularized Mr. Paul Aints team won, which took 11 innings to do, and the last "Mr. Paul Aints" game to be played at Midway Stadium.

On Saturday, August 8, 2015 the Minnesota Atheists teamed up with Foundation Beyond Belief to hold the fourth consecutive year of atheist-sponsored minor league baseball at the new home of the St. Paul Saints, CHS Field. A shoe drive benefiting Soles4Souls was incorporated into the event (promoted as "Leave Your Soles at the Gate"). The team beat the Winnipeg Goldeyes 7-4 in front of 8,500 fans at CHS Field which brought the record of the Mr. Paul Aints to 2 wins and 2 losses. The Mr. Paul Aints won again in 2016, but lost in 2017 bringing their record to 3 games won and 3 games lost.

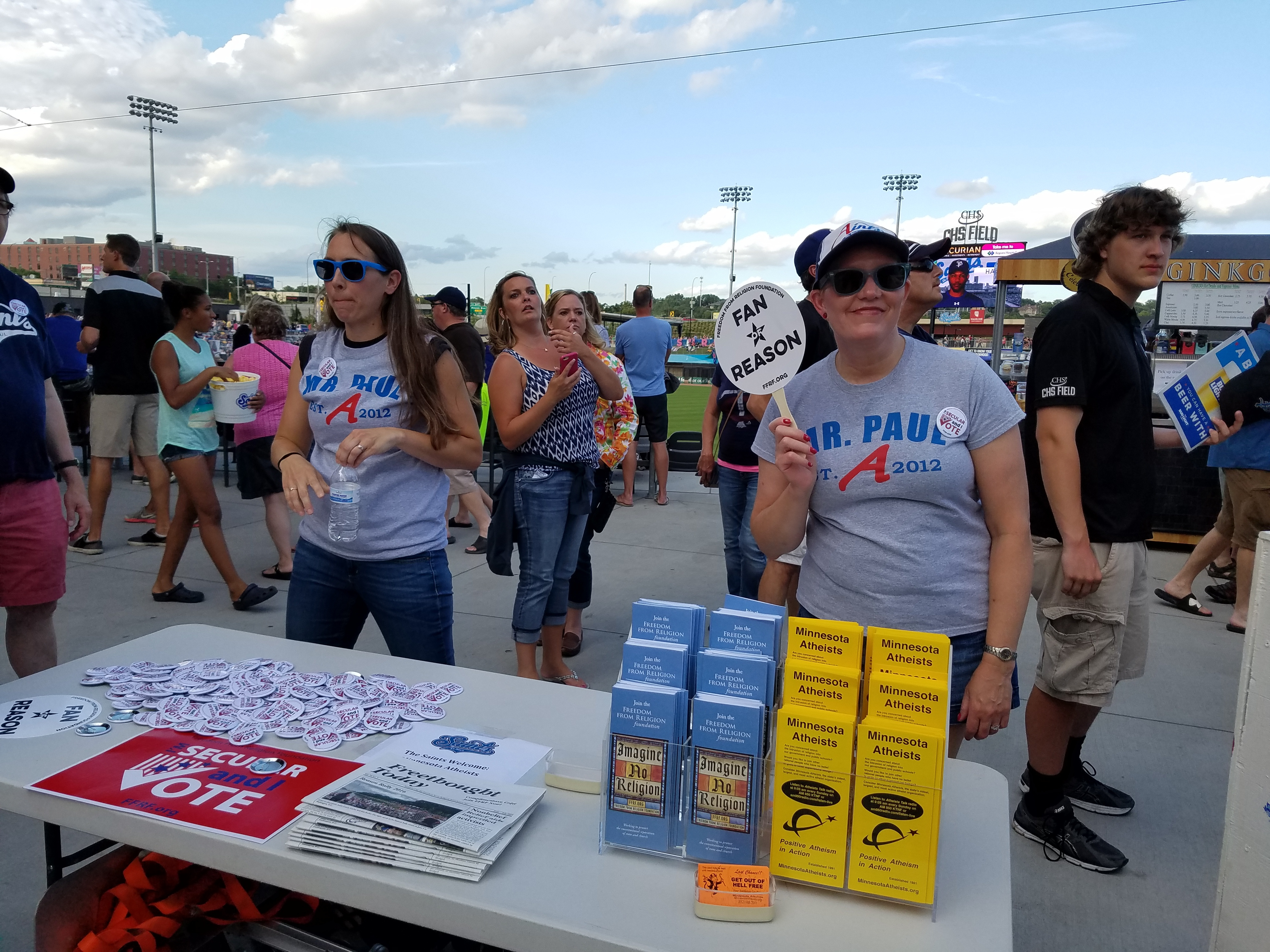
Minnesota Atheists volunteers greeting fans at sponsored St. Paul Saints game

In 2018, after six years straight, the Minnesota Atheists and Saint Paul Saints mutually agreed to end the annual sponsorship. Though not eliminating the option of St. Paul Saints sponsorship in the future, the Minnesota Atheists are looking into other means to provide visibility.

=== Billboard campaign ===
In 2012 the Minnesota Atheists bought billboards one in St. Paul and one in Minneapolis to reach out the local atheists. Citing that similar types of billboards had been going up around the country, the billboards promote the idea that religious indoctrination should not happen to children. One critic called them "eye catching". another questioned one of the billboard placement near "religious centers". The billboards tied for second place in an "atheist billboard of the year" poll on the Friendly Atheist blog.

== Legal campaigns ==
In March 2004, the Minnesota Atheists spoke out against President Bush's speech supporting a U.S. Constitutional ban on same-sex marriage. Stating that the Minnesota Atheists support the religious making and following their own rules but against these becoming civil laws. In July 2011, Minnesota Atheists filed the only amicus brief in support of the appeal of Benson, et al. v. Alverson to support the couples in their effort to get rid of the law and argues the unconstitutionality of the Minnesota Defense of Marriage Act, noting the law's theological basis. Stating "By denying the Plaintiff couples the right to marry solely because they are of the same sex, Minnesota law violates the due process, equal protection, freedom of conscience, and freedom of peaceful association provisions contained in Article I, Sections 7, 2, and 16 of the Minnesota Constitution." Representatives from the group stated that when the case Baker v. Nelson was originally heard in 1971 they did not address the issue of religious freedom. A representative from the group also testified at the state senate hearings in March 2013.

== Publishing ==
The Minnesota Atheists managed a compilation of stories from atheists throughout Minnesota with a foreword written by Greta Christina. The publisher states "I wanted there to be a book out there that isn't a diatribe against religion, but just personal stories." A review from Lavender magazine called it an "intriguing exploration of atheism." A review from the Humanists of Minnesota called it "absorbing, unique, and compelling."
