= Foundation Beyond Belief =

US nonprofit organization

GO Humanity
- Abbreviation: GO Humanity
- Formation: 2009
- Dissolved: 2023
- Type: 501(c)(3) non-profit
- Legal status: Dissolved
- Headquarters: Houston, Texas
- Region served: United States
- Official language: English
- Key people: Dale McGowan, Founder and Executive Director (2009-2015) Noelle George, Executive Director (2015-2020) Tiffany S. Ho, Executive Director (2020-2023)
- Website: https://foundationbeyondbelief.org

GO Humanity (Giving and Organizing for Humanity) was a 501(c)(3) nonprofit organization founded in 2009 in Georgia by Dale McGowan, originally under the name Foundation Beyond Belief.

The organization's mission was to "end poverty and hunger, promote good health and well-being, and foster employment opportunities and economic growth in ways that exemplify humanist values." Through giving and organizing a volunteer network, the organization served individuals and communities.

Dale McGowan served as executive director from 2009 to 2015. In 2015, Noelle George took over leadership of the organization. In 2020, Tiffany S. Ho replaced George.

On October 1, 2023, Go Humanity dissolved and ceased operations.

== History ==
GO Humanity was founded in 2009, then under the name Foundation Beyond Belief (FBB). The organization's founder Dale McGowan originally envisioned it as a way for nonreligious people and humanists to give to charity by "passing the tithing plate." The organization was featured in an April 2010 New York Times article on secular philanthropy.

In March 2011, the organization responded to the 2011 Tōhoku earthquake and tsunami by launching a disaster response program, raising and distributing $20,000 for recovery.

In August 2011, FBB merged with the Houston, Texas-based Secular Center USA to launch Volunteers Beyond Belief, a service network initially consisting of five volunteer teams.

The American Cancer Society was criticized in 2011 for turning down participation from Foundation Beyond Belief in its Relay For Life "National Team" program. FBB subsequently partnered with philanthropist Todd Stiefel to create a national team in support of the Leukemia & Lymphoma Society, raising $300,000 in 2012 and nearly $1 million over three years to fund lymphoma research.

Foundation Beyond Belief later sponsored the Reason Rally in both 2012 and 2016.

In July 2014, Foundation Beyond Belief held its first Humanism At Work conference focused on humanist service. The organization held talks about nonreligious identity and humanist service programs, and recognized outstanding contributions by humanist volunteers and organizers with its ongoing annual Heart of Humanism awards. The Humanism At Work conference was held a second time in 2015 before the organization transitioned to integrating the Conference's programming into the American Humanist Association's Annual Conference in 2018.

In October 2014, FBB launched the competitive Compassionate Impact Grant (CIG), consolidating all donations to its Humanist Grants program for the quarter into one large capacity-building grant to the Dudley Street Neighborhood Initiative. Through 2020, FBB gave the CIG one quarter per year to various anti-poverty organizations that met high standards of innovation, inclusiveness, data, and cultural sensitivity. In 2020, the grant became an annual three-year grant of $150,000 to a worthy organization.

The Minnesota Atheists partnered with Foundation Beyond Belief in 2014 and 2015 for the third and fourth atheist-themed St. Paul Saints charity games. They were the first games the secularized Mr. Paul Aints team won, with the 2014 game taking 11 innings and being the last Aints game to be played at Midway Stadium. Rebranded player jerseys were auctioned off during the games and a shoe drive benefiting Soles4Souls was incorporated into 2015 the event (promoted as "Leave Your Soles at the Gate"). The team beat the Winnipeg Goldeyes in 2015 7–4 in front of 8,500 fans at CHS Field bringing the Aints' record to 2 wins and 2 losses. The Aints won again in 2016, but lost in 2017 bringing their record to 3 games won and 3 games lost.

In January 2016, FBB launched a Humanist Disaster Recovery program which deployed to South Carolina following Hurricane Juaquin.

In 2019, Foundation Beyond Belief partnered with Atheist Community of Austin to expand Volunteers Beyond Belief, renamed the Beyond Belief Network.

Foundation Beyond Belief rebranded as GO Humanity in May 2022, updating its values to further emphasize radical inclusion and shared, local power.

On October 1, 2023, Go Humanity dissolved. An email to donors stated "We have met with an insurmountable financial crisis combined with liabilities that have led us to this very hard decision."

== Programs and initiatives ==
=== Grantmaking ===
Since 2009, GO Humanity has raised more than $3.6 million for philanthropic causes worldwide.

Through its original Humanist Grants program, the organization awarded over $1.5 million to 177 nonprofits exemplifying humanist values over 11 years. Each fiscal quarter through 2020, FBB selected four organizations to support, in the categories of Poverty and Health, Human Rights, Education, and Natural World.

=== Service Teams ===
GO Humanity's Service Team network GO Teams encourages and assists local organizations groups to give and organize in their communities. The network is made up of approximately 150 teams throughout the U.S. and the world. GO Humanity provides grants and other support to these teams, sponsoring events in local communities. As of 2022, teams have collectively donated over 227,000 hours of community service (valued at $6.1M).

=== Disaster Recovery ===
In 2014, the American Humanist Association (AHA) and GO Humanity merged their respective charitable programs Humanist Charities (established in 2005) and Humanist Crisis Response (established in 2011).

Between 2014 and 2018, Humanist Disaster Recovery raised over $250,000 for victims of the Syrian Refugee Crisis, Refugee Children of the U.S. Border, Tropical Cyclone Sam, and the Nepal and Ecuadoran Earthquakes, Hurricane Matthew in Haiti, and Hurricanes Irma and Maria. In addition to grants for recovery efforts, volunteers have also helped to rebuild homes and schools in the following locations: Columbia, South Carolina after the effects of Hurricane Joaquin; Denham Springs, Louisiana; and Houston, Texas after flooding from Hurricane Harvey.

=== Humanist Service Corps & Humanist Action: Ghana ===
In 2013, GO Humanity launched the Pathfinders Project, a project to determine the viability of a long term Humanist Service Corp (HSC). Over the course of a year, the team worked with several organizations across the world, including in Cambodia, Uganda, Ghana, Haiti, Ecuador, Colombia, and Guatemala. Upon returning to the United States, the members of the Pathfinders continued their work of promoting humanist service, including speaking about the project to gain new members for future years.

In 2015, the Humanist Service Corps officially launched, with the members serving in a camp for accused witches in Ghana. In 2015 and 2016, Humanist Service Corps provided free health screenings to the rural Ghanaian community of Kukuo. It created a bilingual medical records system to increase healthcare access. For the first time, 1,250 residents of Kukuo gained access to their health information in their native language. HSC also discovered and reported several child marriages during this time.

Humanist Service Corps was renamed Humanist Action: Ghana in 2020, and in 2022 broke off from GO Humanity to become an independent, Ghanaian-run NGO.

== See also ==
- Dale McGowan
- American Humanist Association
- Hemant Mehta
- List of secularist organizations
- Minnesota Atheists
- Greta Christina
- Skepticon
- Secular Coalition for America
- Reason Rally
