= Richard Carrier =

American historian and Christ myth theorist (born 1969)

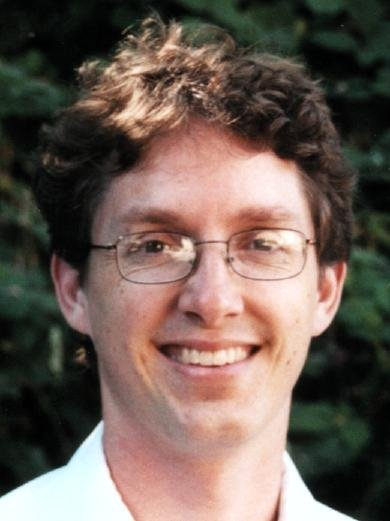
- Born: Richard Cevantis Carrier; December 1, 1969 (age 56); Orange County, California, U.S.
- Education: University of California, Berkeley (BA); Columbia University (MA, MPhil, PhD)
- Spouse: Jennifer Robin Carrier (1995–2015)
- Website: richardcarrier.info

Richard Cevantis Carrier (born December 1, 1969) is an American historian, author, and Christ myth theorist. A longtime contributor to skeptical outlets including The Secular Web and Freethought Blogs, Carrier writes about philosophy and religion in classical antiquity, examining the development of early Christianity from a skeptical perspective and addressing modern debates about religion and morality. He frequently debates the historical basis of the Bible and Christianity and promotes the view that Jesus did not exist in his publications. Carrier's mythicist views have been rejected by academic scholarship, and are considered fringe.

== Background ==
In his autobiographical essay "From Taoist to Infidel", Carrier recounts a benign Methodist upbringing, an early adult conversion to Taoism, and conflicts with Christian fundamentalists while he served in the United States Coast Guard. He writes that those experiences and his study of religion, Christianity, and Western philosophy led him to embrace naturalism. Carrier married Jennifer Robin Carrier in 1995, and the couple divorced in 2015. When he announced the separation he described himself as polyamorous and said the final two years of their marriage were an open relationship.

In 2008, Carrier received a doctorate in ancient history from Columbia University, where he studied the history of science in antiquity. His thesis was titled "Attitudes Towards the Natural Philosopher in the Early Roman Empire (100 B.C. to 313 A.D.)."

From 1996 to 2008 Carrier edited and contributed extensively to The Secular Web, writing about atheism and metaphysical naturalism. Those essays later formed the basis for his book Sense and Goodness without God. Carrier has frequently spoken at skeptic, secular humanist, freethought, and atheist conventions, including the annual Freethought Festival in Madison, Wisconsin, Skepticon in Springfield, Missouri, and gatherings hosted by American Atheists.

Carrier initially regarded the nonexistence of Jesus as a fringe theory that did not warrant academic investigation, but readers asked him to examine the topic and crowdfunded his research. He later became a vocal advocate of the view that Jesus was not a historical person. Carrier notes the scholarly consensus when he writes "the non-existence of Jesus is simply not plausible, as arguments from silence in the matter aren't valid, nor could they ever be sufficient to challenge what is, after all, the near-universal consensus of well-qualified experts."

== Public debates and other media ==
Richard Carrier at Skepticon (2016).

Carrier has engaged in several formal debates, both online and in person, on a range of subjects, including naturalism, natural explanations of early Christian resurrection accounts, the morality of abortion, and the general credibility of the Bible. He debated Michael R. Licona on the Resurrection of Jesus at the University of California, Los Angeles on April 19, 2004. Carrier debated atheist Jennifer Roth online on the morality of abortion. He has defended naturalism in formal debates with Tom Wanchick and Hassanain Rajabali. In 2013, Carrier debated David Marshall on the general credibility of the New Testament. His debates on the historicity of Jesus have included professor of religious studies Zeba A. Crook, Christian scholars Dave Lehman and Doug Hamp.

In 2006, Carrier was the keynote speaker at the Humanist Community of Central Ohio's annual Winter Solstice Banquet, where he spoke on defending naturalism as a philosophy. He appears in Roger Nygard's 2009 documentary The Nature of Existence, in which people of different religious and secular philosophies are interviewed about the meaning of life.

In 2007, English philosopher Antony Flew, who long advocated atheism in the absence of empirical evidence of divinity, published his final book with co-author Roy Varghese, There Is a God: How the World's Most Notorious Atheist Changed His Mind. Flew espoused the position that there was an intelligent creator, thereby embracing deism. Carrier wrote to Flew and discussed Flew's supposed conversion on The Secular Web. Carrier concluded that There Is a God was primarily by Varghese and misrepresented Flew's views. Without addressing Carrier directly, Flew released a rebuttal through his publisher: "My name is on the book and it represents exactly my opinions. I would not have a book issued in my name that I do not 100 percent agree with. I needed someone to do the actual writing because I'm 84 and that was Roy Varghese's role. This is my book and it represents my thinking."

The March 18, 2009, debate Did Jesus Rise from the Dead? with William Lane Craig was held at the Northwest Missouri State University and posted on YouTube. Before the debate, Carrier said, "I originally insisted we first debate [on the topic] Are the Gospels Historically Reliable? for the simple reason that you can't honestly debate the former until you've debated (and in fact settled) the latter." After the debate, Carrier argued that Craig "focused almost entirely on protecting the Gospels as historical sources, and it was there that his shotgun of arguments got well ahead of my ability to catch up." Another debate with Craig was broadcast on Lee Strobel's television show Faith Under Fire.

The October 25, 2014, debate Did Jesus Exist? with Trent Horn was held in San Diego, California, and posted on YouTube. A debate with Craig A. Evans titled Did Jesus Exist? was held at Kennesaw State University on April 13, 2016, and posted online by KSUTV.

Carrier appears in the 2020 film Marketing the Messiah, where he discusses several topics, including biblical canon creation, the Pauline sect, the dating of Paul's letters and the Gospels, Gospel authorship and redactions over time, and his interpretation of the Gospels as allegory. On allegory, he specifically addresses the story of Jesus Barabbas as a symbolic retelling of atonement in Leviticus.

== Publications ==
Carrier's publications include 11 books and eight contributions to other publications. His best-known works concern the development of early Christianity and mythicism, as well as Roman scientific education and practices.

=== Sense and Goodness without God ===
Sense and Goodness without God: A Defense of Metaphysical Naturalism (2005) sets out a systematic naturalist worldview, developing positions in metaphysics, epistemology, philosophy of mind, and ethics, and argues for naturalized moral realism and a physicalist account of consciousness in preference to theism.

=== Not the Impossible Faith ===
Not the Impossible Faith: Why Christianity Didn't Need a Miracle to Succeed (2009) contends that the early Christian movement's growth can be explained by ordinary sociocultural mechanisms rather than miraculous events, assessing claims about missionary strategy, social networks, class and gender dynamics, and patronage in the Roman world.

=== Why I Am Not a Christian ===
Carrier's 2011 book Why I Am Not a Christian: Four Conclusive Reasons to Reject the Faith outlines a case against Christian theism by examining miracle claims, scriptural authority, moral theory, and the comparative explanatory power of naturalism.

=== Proving History, On Historicity, and Outer Space ===
Carrier has linked Proving History, On the Historicity of Jesus, and Jesus from Outer Space as an informal trilogy. Proving History introduces his Bayesian framework for historical method, On the Historicity of Jesus applies that framework to competing mythicist and historicist models, and Jesus from Outer Space restates the argument for general readers.

Proving History: Bayes's Theorem and the Quest for the Historical Jesus (2012) promotes formal probabilistic reasoning in historical research, critiques the "criteria of authenticity" used in Jesus studies, and defends Bayesian probability analysis as a way to compare hypotheses.

Carrier argues that Bayes' theorem should guide historical methodology. He maintains that a Bayesian analysis renders the ahistoricity of Jesus the most probable conclusion and that Jesus originated as a mythic figure rather than as a historical person who was later mythologized. Carrier estimates the probability of Jesus' existence at between 1/3 and 1/12000, depending on the values supplied to his model. Critics have rejected his methodology, calling it "tenuous" and "problematic and unpersuasive". Simon Gathercole argues that Carrier's conclusions "are contradicted by the historical data."

On the Historicity of Jesus: Why We Might Have Reason for Doubt (2014) applies the framework from Proving History to the question of Jesus's existence, develops minimal historicist and mythicist models, surveys the surviving evidence, and argues that a mythicist reconstruction is at least as probable as historicity.

Carrier has said: "I am also the first historian in a hundred years to publish a complete peer-reviewed, academic press argument for the origin and development of Christianity that does not include a historical Jesus." Sheffield Phoenix Press, a biblical studies publisher, released the volume. Carrier argues that a Bayesian analysis leaves insufficient evidence for a historical Jesus and that the earliest Christians revered a celestial or "angelic extraterrestrial" named Jesus who was subordinate to God. He maintains that this being emerged from a "cosmic sperm bank" and was tortured and crucified by Satan and his demons, buried above the clouds, and resurrected in outer space. Carrier writes that the celestial Jesus was known through private revelations and scriptural interpretation before being cast as a narrative figure in the Gospels. He contends that the allegorical dimension of Jesus was lost during early disputes over control of Christian communities. Because the gospels were written decades after Jesus' death, Carrier considers them "wildly fictitious" and treats the Gospel of Mark as an extended meta-parable. He argues that later references to Jesus depended on the Gospels rather than independent testimony. Apart from the hero archetype pattern, Carrier contends that nothing in the Gospels is reliable evidence for or against historicity.

Jesus from Outer Space: What the Earliest Christians Really Believed about Christ (2020) offers a popular-level restatement of Carrier's mythicist hypothesis presented in On the Historicity of Jesus, arguing that the earliest Christ cult centered on a celestial rather than historical person and that later narratives re-situated that figure in a biographical frame.

=== Hitler Homer Bible Christ ===
Hitler Homer Bible Christ: The Historical Papers of Richard Carrier 1995–2013 (2014) collects articles and conference papers on early Christianity, historical method, Greco-Roman science, and textual criticism, including the study of Hitler's Table Talk translations.

=== Science Education and The Scientist in the Early Roman Empire ===
The Science Education in the Early Roman Empire monograph (2016) revises Carrier's dissertation and surveys the curricular, institutional, and social settings through which scientific knowledge was taught in the Roman world, with attention to rhetorical schooling, technical handbooks, and educational stratification. In his review, Michiel Meeusen wrote the work had defects such as "whiggism employed in dealing with ancient science and scientists".

The Scientist in the Early Roman Empire companion volume (2017) significantly expands upon and examines the practice and social roles of investigators of nature in Roman antiquity, drawing on literary, epigraphic, and papyrological sources, and advances claims about trajectories in ancient scientific inquiry and their reception in late antiquity. In his review, Cristian Tolsa calls parts of Carrier's framework reductionist and notes "serious anachronisms".

=== Gesù resistente Gesù inesistente ===
Gesù resistente Gesù inesistente. Due visioni a confronto (2022), co-authored with Fernando Bermejo-Rubio, Franco Tommasi, and Robert M. Price, stages a structured debate between historicist and mythicist interpretations of Christian origins for an Italian readership, with Carrier outlining his mythicist model.

=== Essays ===
==== Criticism of Hitler's Table Talk ====
Carrier collaborated with Reinhold Mittschang to challenge several quotations attributed to Adolf Hitler in the monologues published as Hitler's Table Talk. Their paper argues that the French and English translations are "entirely untrustworthy" and suggests that translator François Genoud doctored portions of the text to amplify Hitler's hostility toward Christianity. Carrier produced a new translation of twelve quotations using the German editions of Henry Picker and Werner Jochmann and a fragment of the Bormann-Vermerke at the Library of Congress, disputing passages often cited to show Hitler's contempt for Christianity. He concludes that Hitler's comments "resemble Kant's with regard to the primacy of science over theology in deciding the facts of the universe, while remaining personally committed to a more abstract theism." Carrier also maintains that the monologues deride Catholicism while "voicing many of the same criticisms one might hear from a candid (and bigoted) Protestant."

In a new foreword to Table Talk, Gerhard Weinberg writes, "Carrier has shown the English text of the table-talk that originally appeared in 1953 and is reprinted here derives from Genoud's French edition and not from one of the German texts." Derek Hastings cites Carrier's paper for "an attempt to undermine the reliability of the anti-Christian statements." Carrier's thesis that the English translation should be dispensed with entirely is rejected by Richard Steigmann-Gall, who acknowledges the controversies Carrier raises but "ultimately presume[s] its authenticity." Johnstone writes that Carrier purports to show that only four of the 42 comments in Table Talks have been misrepresented, without discussing the rest, and that for this reason, Carrier has been far from successful in demolishing the view of Hitler as a non-Christian.

==== The Spiritual Body of Christ and the Legend of the Empty Tomb ====
In The Spiritual Body of Christ and the Legend of the Empty Tomb, a chapter in the edited volume The Empty Tomb: Jesus Beyond the Grave (2005) by Robert M. Price and Jeffrey Lowder, Carrier argues that the earliest Christians, following Paul's language in 1 Corinthians 15 and 2 Corinthians 5, understood resurrection as the acquisition of a new spiritual body rather than the revivification of the corpse, and that empty tomb narratives arose later as legend. He reads 1 Cor 15:35–58 as teaching an exchange of bodies and treats 'soma pneumatikon' as a heavenly, immaterial body. He allows natural explanations for the fate of Jesus' remains; in separate chapters of the same book other scholars develop theft and misplacement scenarios.

Carrier's interpretation has been challenged. Stephen T. Davis, a philosopher of religion at Claremont McKenna College, argues for the early and evidential status of the empty tomb tradition, writing that "most biblical scholars agree with me that the empty tomb tradition goes back to the earliest proclamation of the Resurrection" and concluding that "the empty tomb tradition is very well established, and its central claims are believable." Davis also published a formal review of the volume in Philosophia Christi. Norman Geisler, an evangelical theologian and apologist, contends that the New Testament depicts an imperishable and supernatural risen body, writing, "there is evidence in the Gospels that Jesus' post-revivified body was imperishable and that it was supernatural." New Testament scholar Andrew W. Pitts rejects Carrier's two body exchange reading on methodological and linguistic grounds, writing, "his social model will strike many New Testament scholars as quite antiquated due to its reliance on Rabbinic materials."

== Views ==
=== Atheism Plus ===
Carrier strongly advocated for a movement in atheism called "Atheism Plus", in which the atheist community ought to also have a liberal political agenda. Philosopher Massimo Pigliucci criticized Carrier for intolerance of people who disagreed with him or his views and for radicalizing the "Atheism plus" agenda. Pigliucci also quoted the originator of "Atheism plus", Jen McCreight, criticizing Carrier.

=== Mythicism ===
In 2002 Carrier reviewed the work of Earl Doherty, who argued that Jesus began as a mythological being later recast as historical. Carrier judged the theory plausible while still considering the historical Jesus more probable and rejected several of Doherty's arguments as untenable, though he found the overall concept consistent with the evidence. Over time he adopted Doherty's premise as the most likely explanation for Christian origins. He wrote, "It does soundly establish the key point that Jesus was regarded as a pre-existent incarnate divine being from the earliest recorded history of Christianity, even in fact before the writings of Paul, and that this was not even remarkable within Judaism." Doherty admits that his own theory is fringe.

Carrier has described Christ myth theory as "very probable" since late 2005. In 2009 he wrote, "though I foresee a rising challenge among qualified experts against the assumption of historicity [of Jesus], as I explained, that remains only a hypothesis that has yet to survive proper peer review."

Carrier argues that the earliest Christians honored Jesus as a celestial or "angelic extraterrestrial" subordinate to God who emerged from a "cosmic sperm bank" and was tortured and crucified by Satan and his demons, buried above the clouds, and resurrected in outer space in the region between the earth and the moon. He maintains that early believers knew this celestial Jesus through private revelations and scriptural interpretation and that "The Gospel began as a mythic allegory about the celestial Jesus, set on earth, as most myths then were." According to Carrier, subsequent storytellers placed Jesus alongside historical figures and locations, and later worshipers mistook those allegories for biography.

Carrier asserts that the idea of a pre-Christian celestial being named "Jesus" is known from the writings of Philo of Alexandria on the Book of Zechariah. He argues that Philo's angelic being is identical to the Apostle Paul's Jesus: he is God's firstborn son, the celestial 'image of God', and God's agent of creation. Larry Hurtado contends that the figure named "Jesus" in Zechariah is a completely distinct figure, and that the Logos Philo discusses is not an angelic being at all.

In Carrier's view, Paul's reference in Romans 1:3 to Jesus as the "seed" of David describes an incarnation drawn from a "cosmic sperm bank" rather than literal descent from David. He interprets Paul as teaching that Jesus temporarily assumed a surrogate human body and that demons fulfilled the requirement for blood sacrifice by crucifying him. Gathercole notes that Romans 1:3 echoes a common Septuagint expression meaning "descendant" and reflects a pervasive biblical theme about David's lineage. Carrier further argues that, in continuity with Merkabah mysticism and its layered cosmology, "Mythicism places the incarnation of Jesus below the heavens... being the whole vast region between the earth and the moon [the firmament], was well-established in both Jewish and pagan cosmology (see Element 37, Chapter 4, OHJ, pp. 184–193)."

== Reception and criticism ==
On the Historicity of Jesus was positively reviewed by collaborator and fellow mythicist Raphael Lataster in the Journal of Religious History, who concurs that according to the Gospels, "Jesus fits almost perfectly" the Rank-Raglan mythotype, and claims that there is "not a single confirmed historical figure" that conforms to the mythotype.

Most contemporary scholarship has been critical of Carrier's methodology and conclusions. Marko Marina, an ancient historian, has said that Carrier's work is guided by his ideological agenda, not by serious historical work, and criticizes his views of early Christianity, citing a lack of evidence from primary sources. Marina notes that Carrier's mythicist views have won no support among critical scholars. Historian Daniel Gullotta has questioned Carrier's mythicist views and motives.

=== Critiques of Mythicism ===
Both classicists and biblical scholars agree that Jesus of Nazareth was a historical person. In 2004, Michael Grant wrote, "In recent years, 'no serious scholar has ventured to postulate the non-historicity of Jesus' or at any rate very few, and they have not succeeded in disposing of the much stronger, indeed very abundant, evidence to the contrary." More recently, Patrick Gray wrote, "That Jesus did in fact walk the face of the earth in the first century is no longer seriously doubted even by those who believe that very little about his life or death can be known with any certainty." (Note: "Although it remains a fringe phenomenon, familiarity with the Christ myth theory has become much more widespread among the general public with the advent of the Internet.") Proposals that a historical Jesus did not exist are frequently dismissed as "fringe theories" within classical scholarship.

M. David Litwa of Australian Catholic University, in a discussion of Carrier's work with a focus on On the Historicity of Jesus, wrote that Carrier portrays himself "as a kind of crusader fighting for the truth of secular humanism" whose mission is "to prove Christianity (or Carrier's understanding of it) wrong." He also wrote, "Carrier's cavalier dismissal of the Bible and animosity toward the biblical deity would not seem to predispose him for careful biblical scholarship." Litwa describes Carrier as "on the fringes of the academic guild", although he is a trained scholar and does employ scholarly methods, and argues against several arguments Carrier makes in On the Historicity of Jesus. Litwa writes that Carrier's application of the Rank-Raglan mythotype to Jesus relies on forced similarities and that "the pattern ignores major elements of [Jesus's] life." He also criticizes Carrier's attempts to derive Jesus from James Frazer's theory of the Near-Eastern dying-and-rising fertility god as relying on a "largely defunct" category in religious scholarship. He notes that few gods die and rise, usually staying dead in some way. Although Litwa acknowledges a parallel between the suffering experienced by dying deities and Jesus's suffering, he argues that pagan dying deities do not choose to die as Jesus does. Of Carrier's appeals to other ancient religious figures such as Romulus and the prophet Daniel who appear not to have existed, Litwa argues that Jesus is attested only twenty years after his death by Paul: "A name and a human character to go with it could not have been invented in this short period without invoking suspicion." Litwa dismisses Carrier's hypothesis that Paul's Jesus was an angelic being crucified on the celestial plane as relying on "baseless" speculation that the second-century Ascension of Isaiah was available to Paul and that its mention of Jesus's birth on earth and his crucifixion in Jerusalem are later additions, despite scholarship to the contrary.

James McGrath notes that Carrier's view of a celestial Jesus dying in outer space, never on earth, comes from a mythicist interpretation of Ascension of Isaiah and was central to Earl Doherty's mythicist view. According to McGrath, the text is a later one that includes a descent to earth and fits more with a Docetic view than mythicism.

Christopher Hansen observed that Carrier believes Jews already believed in a preexisting a supernatural son of God named Jesus based on Philo's interpretation of Zechariah 6:12. Hansen argues that this view is supported by weak arguments and no evidence. Following Daniel Gullotta, Hansen writes, "there is not a single instance of a recorded celestial angel or Logos figure named Jesus/Joshua in ancient Jewish literature."

Professor Emeritus Larry Hurtado of the University of Edinburgh writes that, contrary to Carrier's claims, Philo of Alexandria never refers to an archangel named "Jesus". Hurtado also says that Paul clearly believed Jesus to have been a real man who lived on earth, and that the deities of pagan savior cults, such as Isis and Osiris, were not transformed in their devotees' ideas from heavenly deities to actual people living on earth.

Similar criticism was made by Simon Gathercole of Cambridge, who concludes that Carrier's arguments, and more broadly, the mythicist positions on different aspects of Paul's letters, are contradicted by the historical data, and that Paul's description of Jesus' life on Earth, his personality and family, establish that Paul viewed Jesus as a natural person, not an allegorical figure. According to Hansen, Carrier's understanding of Romans 1:3 as meaning that Jesus was born in heaven by God from a "cosmic sperm bank" is not supported by Jewish or Christian sources or even by the scholars Carrier cites.

==== Methodological critiques ====
According to James F. McGrath, Carrier misuses Rank and Raglan's criteria and stretches their scales to make Jesus appear to score high on mythotype. According to Christopher Hansen, Carrier misuses and manipulates Raglan's scale to make Jesus appear more aligned with a mythotype by scoring him high, thus more mythical, when other scholars have scored Jesus as low, thus more historical. He argues that other scholars have assessed Jesus to be low on Raglan's scale, and when Hansen looks at multiple other examples of historical figures he notes that "Historical figures regularly become Raglan heroes. They often score twelve or more points on the Raglan archetype", which casts doubts on the usefulness of the Raglan scale for historicity.

Aviezer Tucker, previously an advocate of applying Bayesian techniques to history, expressed some sympathy for Carrier's view of the gospels, stating: "The problem with the Synoptic Gospels as evidence for a historical Jesus from a Bayesian perspective is that the evidence that coheres does not seem to be independent, whereas the evidence that is independent does not seem to cohere." However, Tucker argues that historians have been able to use theories about the transmission and preservation of information to identify reliable parts of the gospels. He says that "Carrier is too dismissive of such methods because he is focused on hypotheses about the historical Jesus rather than on the best explanations of the evidence."

New Testament scholar Bart Ehrman writes that Carrier is one of only two scholars with relevant graduate credentials who argue against the historicity of Jesus. Discussing Carrier's theory that some Jews believed in a "humiliated messiah" before Christianity, Ehrman criticizes Carrier for "idiosyncratic" readings of the Old Testament that ignore modern critical scholarship on the Bible. Ehrman concludes, "We do not have a shred of evidence to suggest that any Jew prior to the birth of Christianity anticipated that there would be a future messiah who would be killed for sins—or killed at all—let alone one who would be unceremoniously destroyed by the enemies of the Jews, tortured and crucified in full public view. This was the opposite of what Jews thought the messiah would be." Ehrman has also publicly addressed Carrier's use of Bayes' Theorem, writing, "most historians simply don't think you can do history that way." He said he only knows of two historians who have used Bayes' Theorem, Carrier and Richard Swinburne, and noted the irony that Swinburne used it to prove Jesus was raised from the dead. Ehrman rejects both Carrier's and Swinburne's conclusions, but concedes that he is not qualified to assess specifics about how they applied the theorem. "I'm not a statistician myself. I've had statisticians who tell me that both people are misemploying it, but I have no way of evaluating it."

Reviewing On the Historicity of Jesus, Daniel N. Gullotta wrote that Carrier has provided a "rigorous and thorough academic treatise that will no doubt be held up as the standard by which the Jesus Myth theory can be measured", but he found Carrier's arguments "problematic and unpersuasive" and his use of Bayesian probabilities "unnecessarily complicated and uninviting". Gullotta criticized Carrier's "lack of evidence, strained readings and troublesome assumptions" and said that Bayes' theorem seems useless, or at least unreliable, in history since it leads to absurd and contradictory results such as Carrier using it to derive a low probability that Jesus existed and Swinburne using it to derive a high probability that Jesus was resurrected. Gullotta also says there is no evidence, documentary or archeological, of a period when Jews or Christians believed that Jesus existed in heaven as a celestial being where he was born from a "cosmic sperm bank" and was subsequently crucified by Satan and his demons in outer space, which is Carrier's "foundational" thesis, rather than living as a human being on earth. Carrier is observed to constantly misinterpret and stretch sources and to extensively use fringe ideas like those of Dennis MacDonald on Homeric epics paralleling some of the Gospels, while downplaying that MacDonald is still a historicist, not a mythicist. Gullotta also observes that Carrier relies on outdated and historically useless methods like Otto Rank and Lord Raglan's hero myth archetype events lists, which have been "almost universally rejected by scholars of folklore and mythology", saying that Carrier alters the quantity and wording of these lists arbitrarily to his favor. Gullotta calls the view that a historical Jesus never existed a "fringe theory" that goes "unnoticed and unaddressed within scholarly circles".

Of the same book, Christina Petterson of the University of Newcastle wrote: "Even if strictly correct, the methodology is tenuous. In addition, the numbers and the statistics seem like a diversion or an illusionary tactic which intentionally confuse and obfuscate". Petterson calls On the Historicity of Jesus somewhat amateurish: "Maths aside, nothing in the book shocked me, but seemed quite rudimentary first year New Testament stuff." She says Carrier's argument that later tales of a historical Jesus should be studied for their literary and rhetorical purpose and not for their historical content "reveals Carrier's ignorance of the field of New Testament studies and early Christianity."

==== Tacitus passage and "Chrestians" claim ====
Carrier writes that the early reference to Christ in the Roman historian Tacitus was a Christian interpolation. He also claims that Tacitus intended to refer to "Chrestians" as a separate religious group unaffiliated with Christianity. However, scholars have rejected this counter-consensus thesis.

Willem Blom argues that Carrier's thesis relies on unconvincing silences and mistaken understandings of the 1st and 2nd centuries. He notes that the consensus view is that the passage is not an interpolation.

Classicist Margaret Williams argues that Carrier's thesis is outdated and not supported on textual grounds. She notes there is no evidence that this non-Christian group ever existed, leading classical scholars to dismiss the claim. Williams also reports that in a recent assessment by latinists on the Tacitus passage, they unanimously deemed the passage authentic. She emphasizes that no serious Tacitean scholar believes it to be an interpolation.

==== Bayesian priors and calculations ====
Gregor et al., with backgrounds in statistics and classical Roman literature, observed flaws in Carrier's methodology and Bayesian calculations, namely that he used 14 people from before the 10th century BCE to calculate the probability of Jesus' existence. This selection influenced his probability of historicity of Jesus to be 33% at best (a fortiori). When Gregor's team used 33 people from after the 10th century BCE along with when they lived, they found that most were historical. A fortiori, this alters the probability of the historicity of Jesus to 99%. Further research, increased the number of samples of raglan heroes being historical instead of mythical, increasing even further probability of Jesus being historical.

== Bibliography ==
- Sense and Goodness without God: A Defense of Metaphysical Naturalism. AuthorHouse (2005) ISBN 1420802933
- Chapters: "The Spiritual Body of Christ and the Legend of the Empty Tomb", "The Plausibility of Theft", "The Burial of Jesus in Light of Jewish Law" in The Empty Tomb: Jesus Beyond the Grave edited by Robert M. Price & Jeffery Jay Lowder (Amherst, NY: Prometheus Books 2005) ISBN 978-1591022862
- Not the Impossible Faith: Why Christianity Didn't Need a Miracle to Succeed Lulu.com (2009) ISBN 978-0557044641
- Chapter: "Bayes's Theorem for Beginners: Formal Logic and Its Relevance to Historical Method" in Sources of the Jesus Tradition: Separating History from Myth, ed. R. Joseph Hoffmann (Amherst, NY: Prometheus Books 2010) ISBN 978-1616141899
- Chapters: "Why the Resurrection is Unbelievable", "Christianity Was Not Responsible for Modern Science" in The Christian Delusion: Why Faith Fails edited by John W. Loftus (Amherst, NY: Prometheus Books 2010) ISBN 978-1616141684
- Why I Am Not a Christian: Four Conclusive Reasons to Reject the Faith (Philosophy Press, 2011) ISBN 978-1456588854
- Chapters: "Christianity's Success Was Not Incredible", "Neither Life nor the Universe Appear Intelligently Designed", "Moral Facts Naturally Exist (and Science Could Find Them)" in The End of Christianity edited by John W. Loftus (Amherst, NY: Prometheus Books 2011) ISBN 978-1616144135
- Proving History: Bayes's Theorem and the Quest for the Historical Jesus (Amherst, NY: Prometheus Books, 2012) ISBN 978-1616145590
- Chapter: "How Not to Defend Historicity", in Bart Ehrman and the Quest of the Historical Jesus of Nazareth (Cranford, NJ: American Atheist Press 2013) ISBN 978-1578840199
- Hitler Homer Bible Christ: The Historical Papers of Richard Carrier 1995–2013 (Richmond, CA: Philosophy Press, 2014) ISBN 978-1493567126
- On the Historicity of Jesus: Why We Might Have Reason for Doubt (Sheffield Phoenix Press, 2014; revised ed., 2023) ISBN 978-1909697492, 978-1909697355; revised ed. ISBN 978-1914490231, 978-1914490248
- Chapters: "Christianity and the Rise of American Democracy", "The Dark Ages" in Christianity Is Not Great: How Faith Fails edited by John W. Loftus (Amherst, NY: Prometheus Books 2014) ISBN 978-1616149567
- Science Education in the Early Roman Empire (Pitchstone Publishing, 2016) ISBN 978-1634310901
- The Scientist in the Early Roman Empire (Pitchstone Publishing, 2017) ISBN 978-1634311069
- Contributions: "A Path to Secular Reason" and "A Skeptic's Analysis" in Resurrection: Faith or Fact? A Scholars' Debate Between a Skeptic and a Christian by Carl Stecher & Craig L. Blomberg (Pitchstone Publishing, 2019) ISBN 978-1634311748
- Entries: "Does the Testimony of Sacred Scriptures from the Religions of the World Favor (Mono)theism or Atheism?", "At Present, Miracle Claims Undermine Theism", "The Effect of Scientific Progress and the Science of Religion on the Credibility of Theism" in Theism and Atheism: Opposing Arguments in Philosophy (Macmillan Reference/Gale, 2019) ISBN 978-0028664453
- Jesus from Outer Space: What the Earliest Christians Really Believed about Christ (Pitchstone Publishing, 2020) ISBN 978-1634311946
- Gesù resistente Gesù inesistente. Due visioni a confronto (with Fernando Bermejo-Rubio, Franco Tommasi & Robert M. Price, in Italian) (Manni, 2022) ISBN 978-8836171477
- The Obsolete Paradigm of a Historical Jesus (Pitchstone Publishing, 2025; released 11 Nov 2025) ISBN 978-1634312820

== See also ==
- Criticism of the Bible
- Criticism of Christian origins
- List of atheist activists and educators

== Sources ==
- Bernier, Jonathan (2016), The Quest for the Historical Jesus after the Demise of Authenticity: Toward a Critical Realist Philosophy of History in Jesus Studies, Bloomsbury Publishing
- Burridge, Richard A.; Gould, Graham (2004). Jesus Now and Then. William B. Eerdmans Publishing Company. ISBN 978-0802809773.
- Fox, Robin Lane (2005). The Classical World: An Epic History from Homer to Hadrian. Basic Books. ISBN 978-0465024964.
- Gullotta, Daniel N. (2017). "On Richard Carrier's Doubts: A Response to Richard Carrier's On the Historicity of Jesus: Why We Might Have Reason for Doubt". Journal for the Study of the Historical Jesus. 15 (2–3): 310–346. doi:10.1163/17455197-01502009.
- Marina, Marko (2022). "Historical Jesus and Mythicism: A Critical Evaluation of Richard Carrier's Theory". Diacovensia. 30 (2): 215–235. doi:10.31823/d.30.2.3.
- Litwa, M. David (2019). How The Gospels Became History : Jesus and Mediterranean myths. New Haven: Yale University Press. ISBN 978-0300242638.
- Van Voorst, Robert E. (2000). Jesus Outside the New Testament: An Introduction to the Ancient Evidence. Wm. B. Eerdmans Publishing. ISBN 978-0802843685.
- Van Voorst, Robert E. (2003). "Nonexistence Hypothesis". In James Leslie Houlden (ed.). Jesus in History, Thought, and Culture: An Encyclopedia. Vol. 2: K–Z. ABC-CLIO. pp. 658–660. ISBN 978-1576078563.
