= Dale McGowan =

American writer and academic (born 1963)

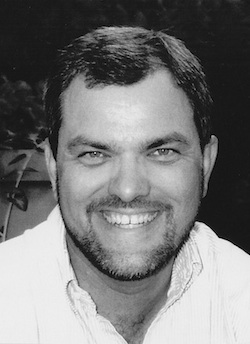
- Occupations: Author, educator, philanthropist, podcaster
- Writing career
- Subjects: Atheism, humanism, music theory, parenting
- Website: www.dalemcgowan.com

Dale McGowan (born February 28, 1963) is an American author, educator, podcaster, and philanthropist who has written and edited several books related to nonreligious life, particularly parenting without religion.

== Personal and professional life ==
McGowan graduated from University of California, Berkeley in 1986 with a double major B.A. in anthropology and music theory. In 1991 he received an MA in Instrumental Conducting from California State University, Northridge. In 1999 he received his Ph.D. from the University of Minnesota in music theory and composition.

From 1991 to 2006, he was associate professor of music at St. Catherine University, a Catholic women's college in Minneapolis/St. Paul. His experiences at the college are satirized in his 2002 novel Calling Bernadette's Bluff and the 2010 sequel Good Thunder. In 2012 he began writing Atheism for Dummies for the popular For Dummies book series.

In 2014 McGowan became National Director of Ethical Education at the American Ethical Union and is a former director of engagement at the multi-faith website Patheos. As of September 2021, he is chief content officer for the secular media company OnlySky.

He currently lives in Atlanta, Georgia.

== Writing, editing, and speaking ==
In 2006, McGowan resigned his university position to pursue a full-time writing career. He edited and co-authored Parenting Beyond Belief (2007), a compilation of essays on raising children outside of religion. Contributors to this volume included Michael Shermer, Richard Dawkins, Penn Jillette, and Julia Sweeney. Around the same time, he began to travel throughout the United States, giving seminars on secular parenting at atheist conventions, as well as Unitarian Universalist and Ethical Culture congregations. In 2009, he released a practical companion to Parenting Beyond Belief titled Raising Freethinkers: A Practical Guide for Parenting Beyond Belief. Like its predecessor, Raising Freethinkers included contributions from multiple authors, including McGowan himself. McGowan was prompted to write the two books because as a freethinking parent looking for advice, "There was nothing else out there". Parenting Beyond Belief lays out a general philosophy of non-religious parenting, and Raising Freethinkers "is the answer to practical questions, activities that the family can do together and resource reviews." His seminars and both books aim to help parents raise open-minded, inquiring kids and not to push them towards any particular world view.

McGowan is an advocate for authoritative parenting which, while not permissive, allows children to understand the reasoning behind clearly defined boundaries and rules, which he claims allows children to make informed moral judgements where no situation specific rules have been pre-set. He further states that indoctrination impedes a child's moral development.

Between 2007 and 2014 he wrote a blog, The Meming of Life: on secular parenting and other natural wonders. He currently writes about mortality at the Patheos blog The Lucky Ones and about music at Unweaving the Score.

Voices of Unbelief: Documents from Atheists and Agnostics, edited by McGowan and published in September 2012, is a collection of documents from atheists and agnostics throughout history. In March 2013, McGowan's book Atheism for Dummies was released by Wiley Publishing. August 2014 saw the release of In Faith and in Doubt, the first comprehensive resource for secular/religious mixed marriages. A second edition of Parenting Beyond Belief with new contributors was released in 2016, and Sharing Reality: How to Bring Secularism and Science to an Evolving Religious World (co-authored with Jeff T. Haley) was published in 2017. He is currently at work on a book about how music communicates emotion.

In January 2018, McGowan presented a TEDx talk in Atlanta on the changing nature of religion and irreligion in America.

In late 2018, McGowan launched three podcasts about music (How Music Does That), raising kids without religion (Raising Freethinkers) and death (The Lucky Ones). He also appears as a regular guest on Parenting Beyond Belief, published by the Atheist Community of Austin.

== Philanthropic work ==
In 2005 while visiting St. Mark's Episcopal Cathedral in Minneapolis, McGowan realized the atheist community lacked a systematic way to donate to charity, such as the church has with tithing or collection plate donations. The idea developed, and by 2009 McGowan had set up Foundation Beyond Belief (FBB), a nonprofit organization designed to encourage and facilitate charitable giving and volunteering among humanists and atheists. The Foundation selects four charitable organizations per quarter, one in each of the following cause areas:

- Education
- Poverty and Health
- Human Rights
- Natural World

Members join the foundation by signing up for a monthly automatic donation in the amount of their choice, then set up personal profiles to indicate how they would like their contribution distributed among the five categories. As of April 2016, the members of FBB have raised over $2 million for charities worldwide. McGowan has said he is happy to acknowledge the things religious communities do better than atheists such as fostering community and charitable giving, and learn from them.

FBB also sponsors more than 125 humanist volunteer teams in cities around the U.S., a Humanist Service Corps providing global service opportunities for nontheists, and Humanist Disaster Recovery Teams, a program coordinating humanist volunteers to respond on the ground after natural disasters.

In 2015 McGowan stepped down as executive director and was succeeded by Noelle George.

== Awards ==
McGowan was named 2008 Humanist of the Year by the Humanist Chaplaincy at Harvard University in recognition for his work in nonreligious parenting education.

== Books ==
- McGowan, Dale (2002). Calling Bernadette's Bluff: A Novel. US: Xlibris. ISBN 1401036074.
- McGowan, Dale, ed. (2007). Parenting Beyond Belief: On Raising Ethical, Caring Kids Without Religion. Europe, Middle East & Africa: McGraw-Hill Education. ISBN 978-0814474266.
- McGowan, Dale; Matsumura, Molleen; Metskas, Amanda; Devor, Jan (2009). Raising Freethinkers: A Practical Guide for Parenting Beyond Belief. New York: AMACOM. ISBN 978-0814410967.
- McGowan, Dale (2010). Good Thunder. US: Xlibris. ISBN 978-1450073349.
- McGowan, Dale, ed. (2012). Voices of Unbelief: Documents from Atheists and Agnostics (Voices of an Era). California: Greenwood. ISBN 978-1598849783.
- McGowan, Dale (2013). Atheism for Dummies. Canada: John Wiley & Sons. ISBN 978-1118509203.
- McGowan, Dale (2014). In Faith and In Doubt: How Religious Believers and Nonbelievers Can Create Strong Marriages and Loving Families. New York: AMACOM. ISBN 978-0814433720.
- McGowan, Dale (second author) with Jeff T Haley (lead author) (2017). Sharing Reality. US: Pitchstone Publishing. ISBN 1634311264.

== See also ==
- Skeptics and Humanist Aid and Relief Effort (S.H.A.R.E.)
