= Annie Laurie Gaylor =

American atheism activist (born 1955)

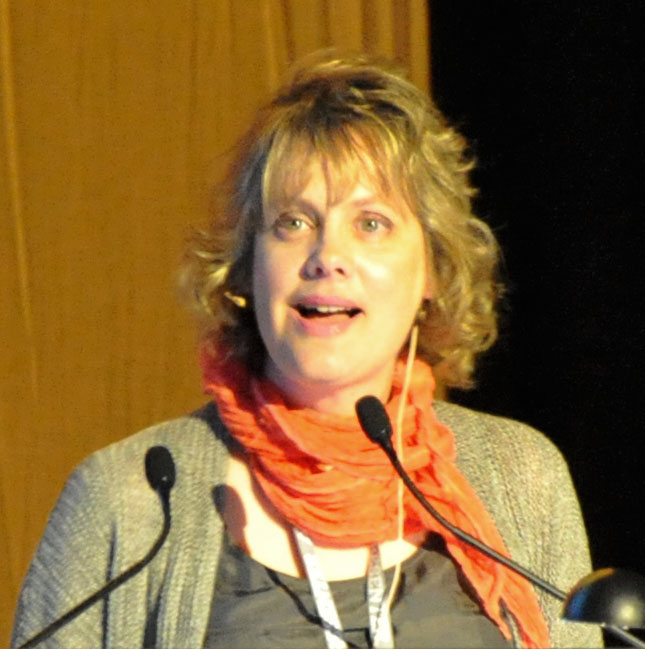
- Gaylor at the 2012 Global; Atheist Convention in Melbourne, Australia
- Born: November 2, 1955 (age 70)
- Education: University of Wisconsin–Madison
- Occupations: Co-president, Freedom From Religion Foundation · Author

Annie Laurie Gaylor (born November 2, 1955) is an American atheist, secular and women's rights activist and a co-founder – and, with her husband Dan Barker, a current co-president – of the Freedom From Religion Foundation. She was also the editor of the organization's newspaper, Freethought Today until 2015. Gaylor is the author of several books, including Woe to the Women: The Bible Tells Me So, Betrayal of Trust: Clergy Abuse of Children and, as editor, Women Without Superstition: No Gods – No Masters.

== Biography ==
Gaylor graduated from the University of Wisconsin–Madison's School of Journalism in 1980.

In 1977, Gaylor, along with her mother (Anne Nicol Gaylor) and feminist groups, spearheaded the protest that led to the recall of county judge Archie Simonson of Dane County, Wisconsin after he had made a statement blaming a young girl for her rape.

Gaylor and her late mother, Anne Nicol Gaylor, and the late John Sontarck, founded the Freedom From Religion Foundation (FFRF) in a meeting around the Gaylors' dining room table in 1978. Gaylor has worked to make the FFRF the largest organization of atheists and agnostics in the United States.

Gaylor is also on the Board of Directors of the Women's Medical Fund, Inc., a group that helps women pay for abortion services. She has been involved in other protests including: protesting abortion restrictions in South Dakota, protesting perceived judicial misconduct in Wisconsin, and speaking out against gun violence.

In 2010, Gaylor received the Humanitarian Heroine award from the American Humanist Association. Gaylor has been an invited speaker at conferences including the 2012 Global Atheist Convention in Melbourne, Australia, and the regional conference of the Minnesota Atheists. She is on the speakers bureau of the Secular Student Alliance.

== Media appearances ==
Gaylor speaking at the Secular Conference 2017 on secularism as a human right.

Gaylor has appeared in numerous print, radio and television media discussing the work of the FFRF, such as an advertising campaign being censored in Las Vegas and the case against the National Day of Prayer.

Gaylor contributes writings to print media across the United States on women's issues: how politics affects women's access to reproductive health care in the state of Wisconsin, the arrest of the Tunisian woman Amina Tyler for posting a nude photo of herself, the 50-year anniversary of the publication of The Feminine Mystique, and the state of women's rights around the world since the Seneca Convention.

Gaylor, along with her husband Dan Barker, hosts a weekly one-hour radio program Freethought Radio. It is broadcast weekly, on Progressive Talk The Mic 92.1, out of Madison, Wisconsin. It is carried on several other stations throughout the Midwest and is available through podcast.

== Personal life ==
Gaylor met Barker when both were guests on AM Chicago, hosted by Oprah Winfrey, in 1984. They began dating six months later and married in 1987. They have a daughter.

== Publications ==
Author

- Annie Laurie Gaylor (1986). It Can't Happen Here?. Complimentary Copy Press.
- Annie Laurie Gaylor (1987). Two Reviews: Encyclopedia of Unbelief. Complimentary Copy Press.
- Annie Laurie Gaylor (1988). Betrayal of Trust: Clergy Abuse of Children. Freedom From Religion Foundation. ISBN 978-1-877733-06-2.
- Annie Laurie Gaylor (2004). Woe to the Women--the Bible Tells Me So: The Bible, Female Sexuality & the Law. Freedom From Religion Foundation. ISBN 978-1-877733-12-3.

Editor

- Annie Laurie Gaylor (1997). Women Without Superstition: No Gods--No Masters: The Collected Writings of Women Freethinkers of the Nineteenth and Twentieth Centuries. Freedom From Religion Foundation. ISBN 978-1-877733-09-3.
