= Debbie Goddard =

- Born: April 16, 1980 (age 46); Philadelphia, Pennsylvania
- Known for: Secular humanist activism
- Website: debbiegoddard.com

Debbie Goddard (born April 16, 1980) is an American atheist activist and speaker, and the director of African Americans for Humanism (AAH). In 2019 she took on the role of vice president of programs at American Atheists. Since 2020, she has been on the board of directors of Humanists International.

== Early life and education ==
Goddard was born April 16, 1980, in Philadelphia, Pennsylvania, and attended Catholic school as a child. While raised Catholic, her father was Jewish, and she occasionally attended Jewish services with him. In sixth grade, she realized that she did not believe in God. She did not identify as an atheist until she learned that word two years later; her family and teachers were not supportive of her disbelief. Her questioning of religion led to her Catholic high school scholarship being revoked.

When she was a teenager, Goddard moved with her family to a primarily white suburb. She attended Montgomery County Community College, and became president of the school's chapter of Campus Freethought Alliance. She reconnected with black people after transferring to Temple University in Philadelphia. There, she tried to start an atheist club, but her friends opposed the idea because they considered atheism and humanism to be "harmful, Eurocentric ideologies." She realized that all the faces she had seen in reference to humanism and atheism were of white men. She became a representative of Black Freethinkers in college.

== Secular activism ==
In 2002 Goddard joined the Center for Inquiry Metro New York Advisory Board. That same year she was named The Student Activist on Beliefnet's Godless Who's Who.

Goddard participated in the secular movement as a volunteer and activist for several years before being hired as a field organizer by the Center for Inquiry in 2006. From 2001 to 2004, she served as the volunteer publications director, then as student president of the Campus Freethought Alliance (later CFI On Campus), an international network of student freethinkers and skeptics.

Goddard became director of African Americans for Humanism in 2010. She has stated that the organization "is focused on getting more humanism into the black community and more people of color into the humanist community." Goddard is one of few women of color leaders in the atheist movement.

In 2019 she became the vice president of programs for American Atheists where she serves as a senior member of the leadership team.

== See also ==
- Atheism in the African diaspora
- Center for Inquiry
- Point of Inquiry, the podcast of the Center for Inquiry
