= Greta Christina =

American atheist blogger, speaker, and author

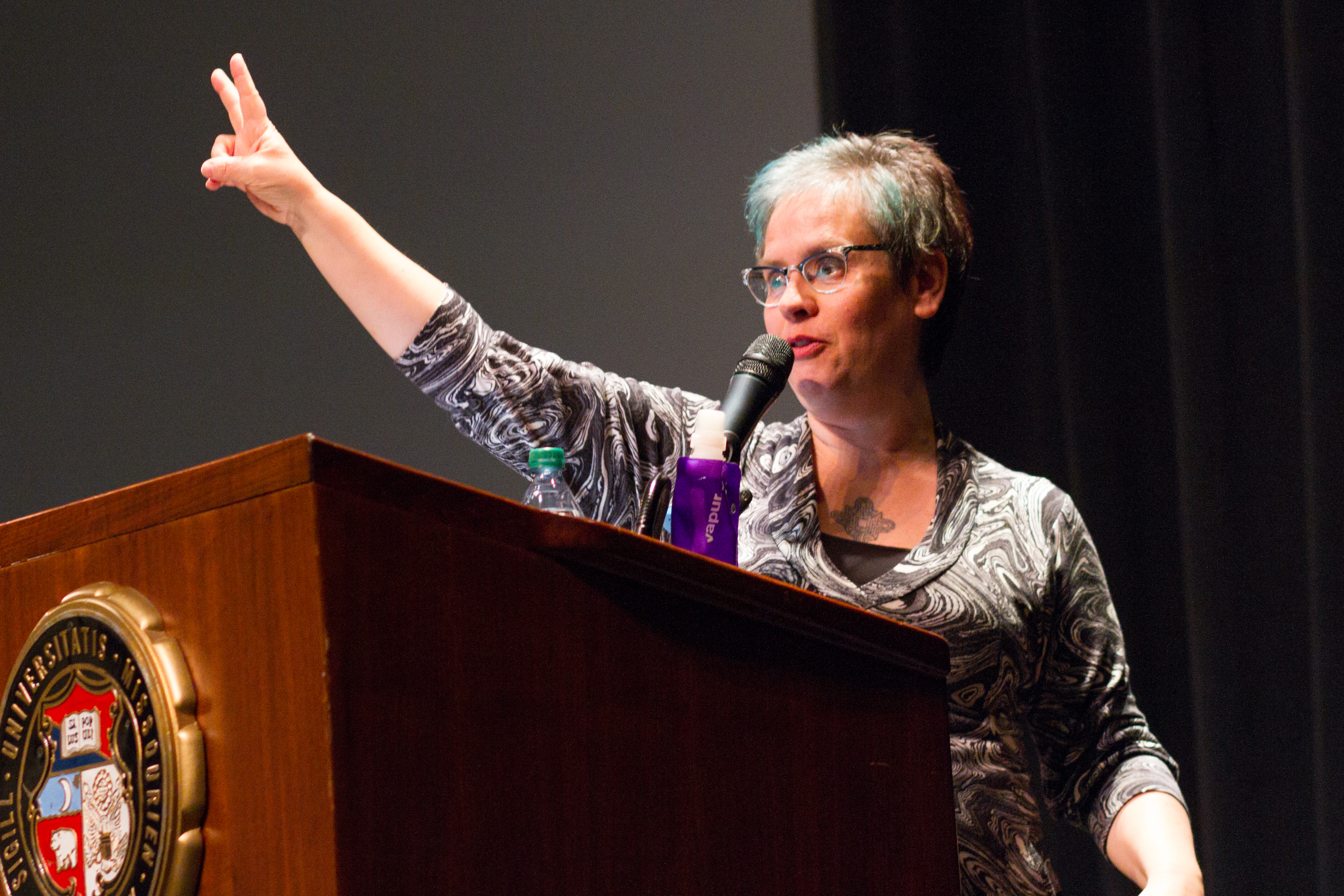
- Christina speaking at the University of Missouri in March 2014
- Born: 1961 (age 64–65); Chicago, Illinois, U.S.
- Education: Reed College
- Occupation: Writer
- Website: https://the-orbit.net/greta/

Greta Christina (born 1961) is an American atheist, blogger, speaker, and author.

== Early life ==
Christina was born in Chicago in 1961. She graduated from Reed College in 1983. She legally changed her name in her twenties, dropping her family name and taking her middle name as her last name.

== Career ==
Christina has written for AlterNet, Free Inquiry, and The Humanist. She started writing her own "Greta Christina's blog" in 2005; it was later incorporated in to the Freethought Blogs network. In 2016 she co-founded The Orbit, which she described as "the first atheist media site founded explicitly to work on all forms of social justice". In 2009, Hemant Mehta at The Friendly Atheist ranked Christina's blog in the Top Ten most popular atheist blogs. She also created the "Atheist Meme of the Day" on Facebook.

She has been writing professionally since 1989, and has been a full-time freelance writer and speaker since 2012. Her writing about atheism has appeared in print in Skeptical Inquirer and the anthology Everything You Know About God Is Wrong, as well as in her own books Coming Out Atheist: How to Do It, How to Help Each Other, and Why (2014) and Why Are You Atheists So Angry?: 99 Things that Piss Off the Godless (2012).

Speaking to Chris Mooney for a Point of Inquiry podcast in 2012, she stated that "there isn't one emotion" affecting atheists "but anger is one of the emotions that many of us have ...[it] drives others to participate in the movement". She said that there are many goals for the atheist movement – more separation of church and state, ending "bigotry against atheism", and for some, persuading people "out of religion", and that it is a "valid goal" to work towards a world without religion.

As a speaker, she is a member of the Speakers Bureau for the Secular Student Alliance and the Center for Inquiry. She was a speaker on the Diversity in Skepticism panel at The Amaz!ng Meeting in July 2011, the Reason Rally in 2012, and the 50th annual convention of American Atheists in 2013.

Rebecca Hensler founded the social media and internet support group 'Grief Beyond Belief' for grieving people who do not believe in God or an afterlife in 2011; she was encouraged to found it by Christina.

In 2013 Christina was named the International Team Honored Hero of the Foundation Beyond Belief (FBB). The Foundation's teams raise money for The Leukemia and Lymphoma Society. She is a past member of the Foundation Beyond Belief's Board of Directors.

She received the 2013 LGBT Humanist Pride Award from the American Humanist Association.

Also in 2013, a photo of Christina with her wife Ingrid and a piece about the photo by Christina was featured in the book A Better Life, by Christopher Johnson, which is a book with photos of 100 atheists and pieces by them about how their atheism has enabled them to have, in their view, a better life.

In 2015, Christina received the first Secular Student Alliance Ambassador Award, which was the 2015 Secular Student Alliance Ambassador Award. Christina is an Advisory Board member of the SSA and a donor at the Lifetime Membership level.

Outside of her atheist work, she is the editor of Paying For It: A Guide by Sex Workers for Their Clients and of the Best Erotic Comic anthology series, and has written the erotic novella Bending and the erotic fiction collection Bending: Dirty Kinky Stories About Pain, Power, Religion, Unicorns, & More. Her writing has also appeared in three volumes of Best American Erotica. She has also written about cats for Catster, and has written for the magazine Femme Feminism.

In San Francisco, Christina has worked at the underground book publisher Last Gasp and the Lusty Lady peep show, and has performed in pornography. She has also co-organized and co-hosted the Godless Perverts Story Hour and the Godless Perverts Social Club.

== Personal life ==
Christina's parents divorced when she was 12. She began living in the San Francisco Bay Area in 1984.

Christina has written that she is a sex-positive, pro-choice feminist and that she supports same-sex marriage and group marriage. She is openly bisexual/pansexual as well as polyamorous, and has written about participating in BDSM. She wrote in 2010 that she and her wife Ingrid had been "happily married" for "six and a half years (or five years, or two and a half years, depending on which of our three weddings in the shifting 'same- sex marriage' winds you're talking about)".

Christina's mother died of cancer at the age of 45, when Christina was 17. In 2012, Christina was diagnosed with endometrial cancer. She had a surgical hysterectomy and oophorectomy to treat it. Christina writes that she has struggled with depression off and on throughout most of her adult life, and considers herself chronically depressed and expects to take antidepressants for the rest of her life.

== Books ==
- Why Are You Atheists So Angry? 99 Things That Piss Off the Godless. Pitchstone Publishing. 2012. ISBN 978-0-9852815-2-6.
- Coming Out Atheist: How to Do It, How to Help Each Other, and Why. Pitchstone Publishing. 2014. ISBN 978-1-939578-19-8.
- Bending: Dirty Kinky Stories About Pain, Power, Religion, Unicorns, & More. Pitchstone Publishing. 2015. ISBN 978-1-63431-007-9.
- Comforting Thoughts About Death That Have Nothing to Do with God. Pitchstone Publishing. 2015. ISBN 978-1-939578-18-1.
- The Way of the Heathen: Practicing Atheism in Everyday Life. Pitchstone Publishing. 2016. ISBN 978-1-63431-068-0.
