= List of YMCA buildings and structures =

This is a list of notable YMCA buildings and structures. Buildings for YMCA use are prominent in many cities and towns.

== Canada ==
- Birks Building (1901), in Winnipeg, Manitoba, listed on Canadian Register of Historic Places in 2004
- Shane Homes YMCA at Rocky Ridge (2018), in Calgary, Alberta, owned by city of Calgary
- Brookfield Residential YMCA at Seton (2019), in Calgary, Alberta, largest YMCA in the world

== Hong Kong ==
- YMCA of Hong Kong at 22 Salisbury road, Tsim Sha Tsui since 1922. In 1996, YMCA of Hong Kong established the College of Continuing Education.

== India ==
- YMCA Institute of Engineering, an educational institution in Faridabad, India.

== Israel ==
- Jerusalem International YMCA (1933)

== Poland ==
- YMCA Building (Warsaw), now the Museum of Scouting, Warsaw

== Puerto Rico ==
- Ponce YMCA Building, Ponce, Puerto Rico, listed on the NRHP in Ponce.

== Singapore ==
- Old YMCA Building, demolished in 1981, a new YMCA Building was rebuilt on its former site.
- YMCA Building

== United Kingdom ==
- Indian Students' Union and Hostel in Central London.
- YMCA Building, Newcastle upon Tyne

== United States ==
(listed by state/DC, then city):

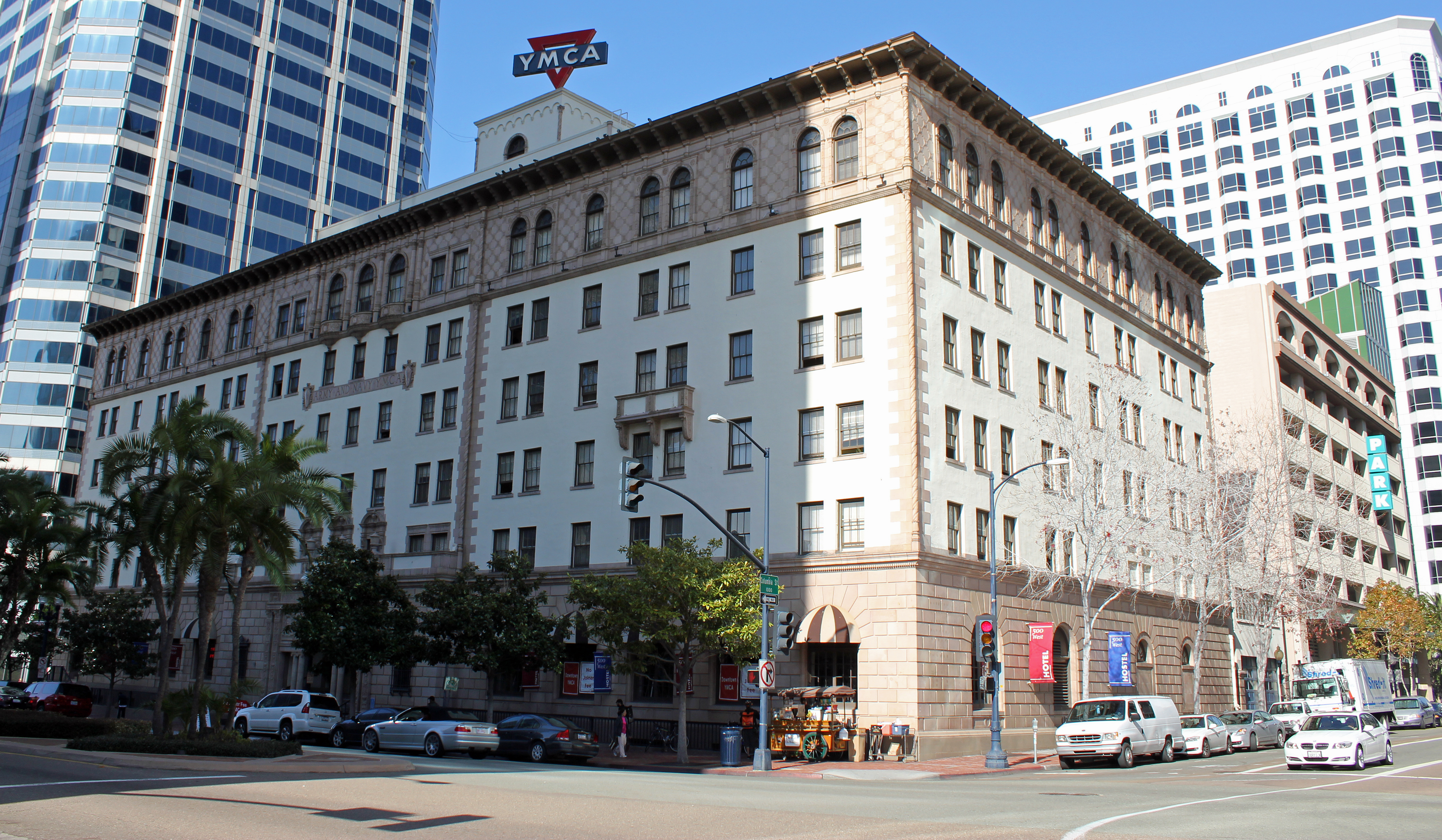
San Diego Armed Services YMCA

=== Arizona ===
- El Paso and Southwestern Railroad YMCA, Douglas, Arizona, listed on the NRHP in Cochise County, Arizona.

=== Arkansas ===
- YMCA-Democrat Building, Little Rock, Arkansas, listed on the NRHP in Little Rock, Arkansas.
- Little Rock YMCA, Little Rock, Arkansas, listed on the NRHP in Little Rock, Arkansas.

=== California ===
- Pomona YMCA Building, Pomona, California, listed on the NRHP in Los Angeles County, California.
- YMCA building (Riverside, California).
- San Diego Armed Services YMCA, San Diego, California, listed on the NRHP in California.
- YMCA Hotel (San Francisco, California), listed on the National Register of Historic Places in San Francisco, California.

=== Colorado ===
- Downtown Denver Central YMCA and Annex, Denver, Colorado, listed on the NRHP in Colorado.

=== Connecticut ===
- Greenwich YMCA, Greenwich, Connecticut, listed on the NRHP in Connecticut.

=== Delaware ===
- Wilmington YMCA (Wilmington, Delaware), listed on the NRHP in Delaware.

=== District of Columbia ===
- Anthony Bowen YMCA, Washington, D.C., listed on the NRHP in Washington, D.C.

=== Georgia ===
- YMCA (Columbus, Georgia), listed on the NRHP in Georgia.

=== Illinois ===
- Wabash Avenue YMCA, Chicago, Illinois, listed on the NRHP in Illinois.
- YMCA Hotel, listed on the National Register of Historic Places in Cook County, Illinois.
- Joliet YMCA, Joliet, Illinois, listed on the NRHP in Illinois.
- Kroehler YMCA, Naperville, IL (closed in 2020, demolished in 2022)

=== Indiana ===
- YMCA (Evansville, Indiana), NRHP-listed

=== Iowa ===
- YMCA Building (Council Bluffs, Iowa), listed on the National Register of Historic Places in Pottawattamie County, Iowa.
- Dubuque YMCA Building, Dubuque, Iowa, listed on the NRHP in Iowa.
- Mason City YMCA, Mason City, Iowa, listed on the NRHP in Iowa.
- YMCA Building (Waterloo, Iowa), listed on the National Register of Historic Places in Black Hawk County, Iowa.

=== Kansas ===
- Scottish Rite Temple (Wichita, Kansas), NRHP-listed, known also as "YMCA Building".

=== Kentucky ===
- YMCA Building (Louisville, Kentucky), listed on the National Register of Historic Places in Jefferson County, Kentucky.
- Knights of Pythias Temple (Louisville, Kentucky), also known as "Chestnut Street Branch-YMCA", NRHP-listed.
- Russell Railroad YMCA, Russell, Kentucky, listed on the NRHP in Kentucky.

=== Louisiana ===
- YMCA, Downtown Branch. Shreveport, Louisiana, listed on the NRHP in Louisiana.

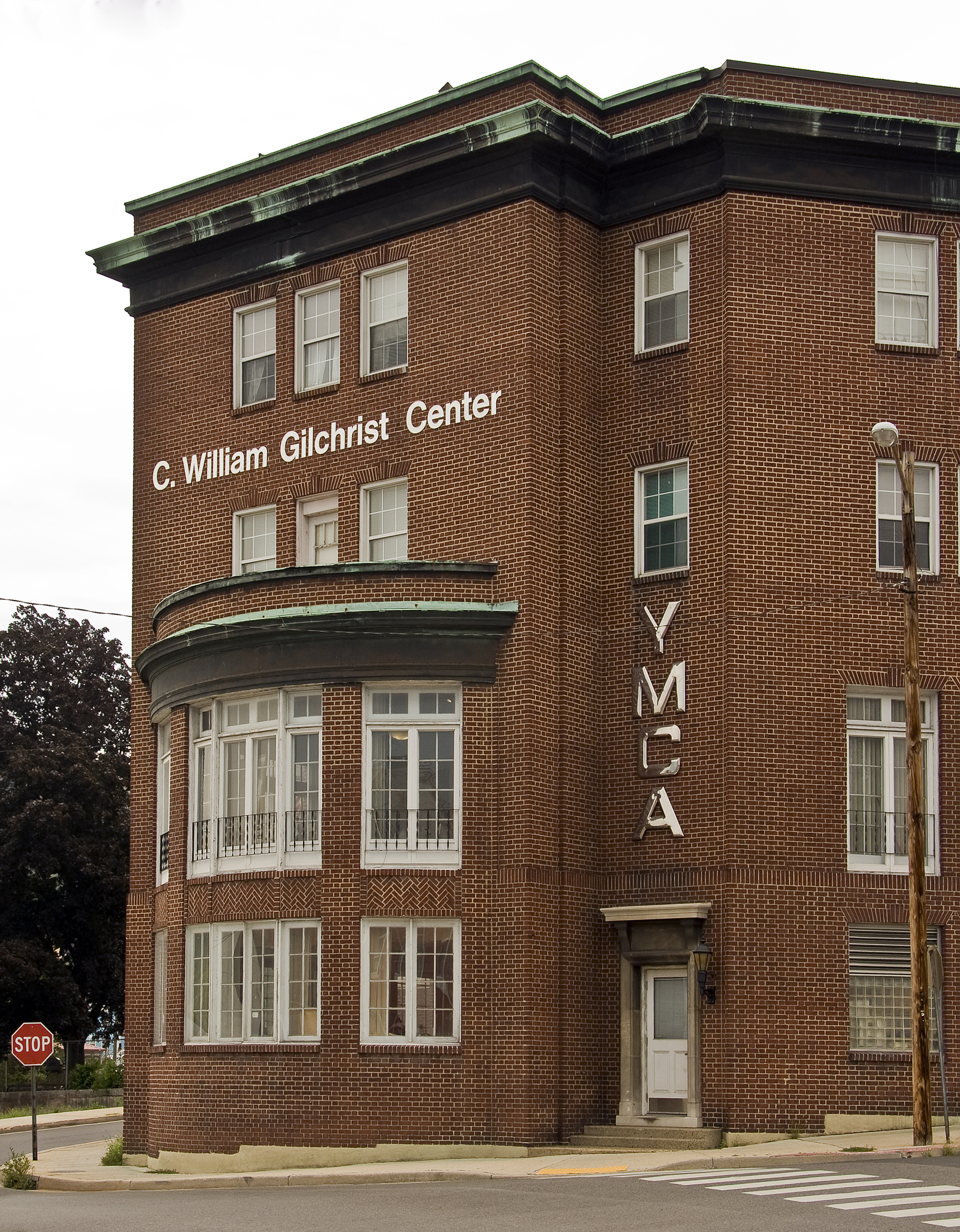
Cumberland YMCA, (C. William Gilchrist Center)

=== Maryland ===
- Baltimore, Maryland, Oldest Central Building of the YMCA constructed 1872–73, a triangular structure of five stories in "Second Empire" style architecture with brick and stone trim, slate mansard roof with large corner central tower and several smaller towers (later removed in early 1900s remodeling), at the northwest corner of West Saratoga and North Charles Street, on the northwest edge of downtown Baltimore. Former historic site of the first Roman Catholic Parish (1770) and Pro-Cathedral of St. Peter's in the new Diocese of Baltimore, which is the first established ("erected") diocese in America with first bishop John Carroll in 1789-90 (built of simple red brick, in Georgian/Federal style with attached rectory and surrounding cemetery), and served as America's first Cathedral until 1821 when the new Baltimore Cathedral designed by Latrobe, several blocks north was dedicated. Designed by famed local architects Neilson and Niernsee, just a few blocks east from where the local YMCA was first established in Baltimore in the 1850s. Old Central YMCA was across Charles Street from the first church in the city and metropolitan area, Old St. Paul's Anglican (Episcopal) Church, founded 1692 in southeastern Baltimore County and later relocated to the southeast corner of Charles and Saratoga when Baltimore Town was first laid out in 1729–30. The Old 19th Century YMCA was later converted into offices in the 1920s when the Association moved several blocks north to West Franklin Street on "Cathedral Hill". On the northeastern edge of the massive downtown "urban renewal" project of "Charles Center" from 1958 to the middle 1970s, spared this unique structure although two elaborate marble/granite banks across West Saratoga Street to the southwest were demolished to be replaced by two twin apartment skyscraper towers and "Charles Plaza", with a movie theatre and commercial shops. Additional interior restoration/renovation on the building was done in the early 1980s and again in 2013 when it was converted into apartments/condos.
- Cumberland YMCA, Cumberland, Maryland, listed on the NRHP in Maryland (C. William Gilchrist Center).

=== Massachusetts ===
- YMCA (Salem, Massachusetts), listed on the NRHP in Massachusetts.

=== Michigan ===
- Muskegon YMCA Building, Muskegon, Michigan, listed on the NRHP in Michigan.

=== Minnesota ===
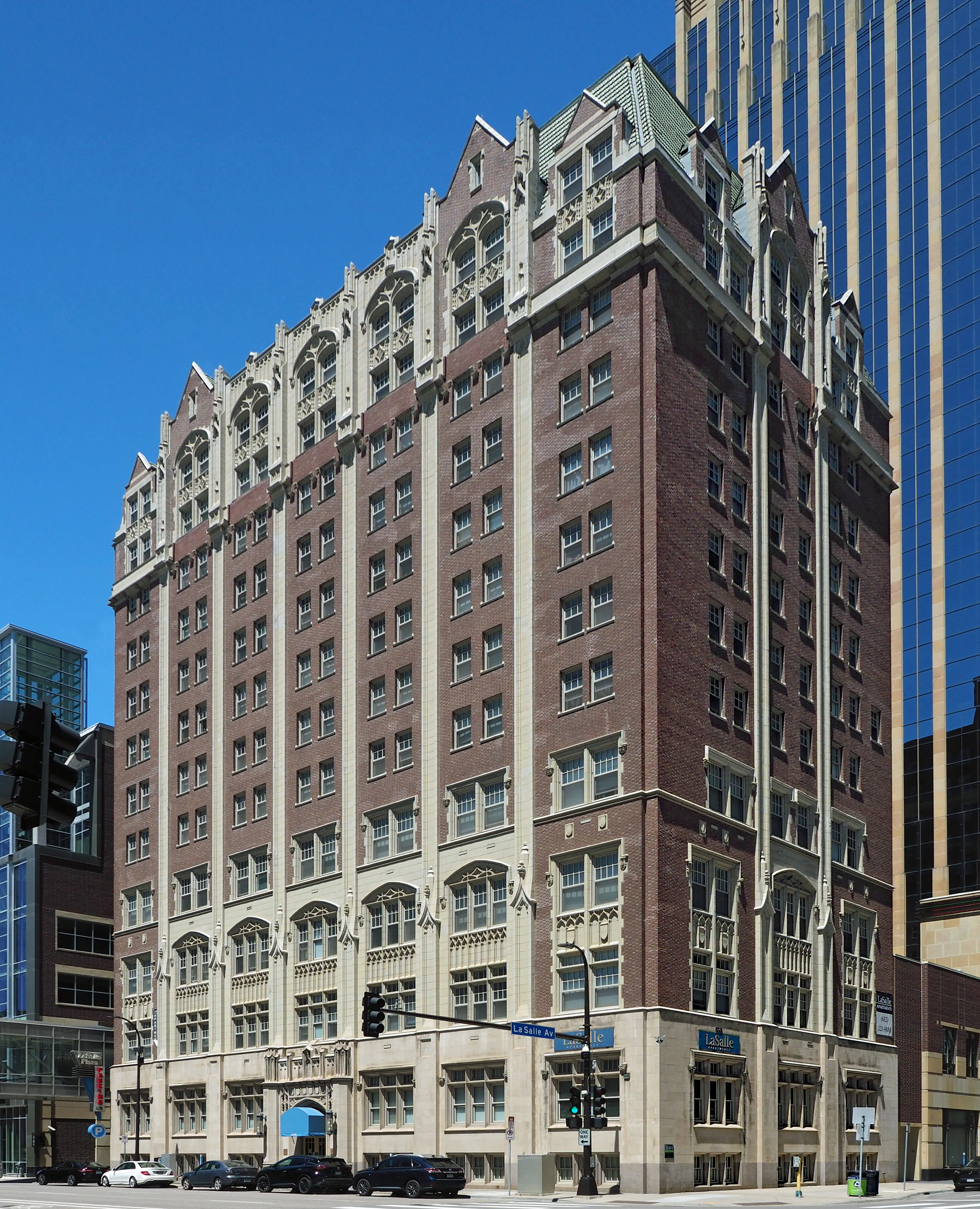
Minneapolis YMCA Central Building, a skyscraper from 1919

- Minneapolis YMCA Central Building, Minneapolis, Minnesota, a 12-story skyscraper building in downtown Minneapolis, Minnesota built in 1919. It was built in the Late "Gothic Revival" style of architecture, making it stand out from other buildings. The Gothic styling was chosen to emphasize the vertical mass of the structure and to make it appear as a powerful corporate symbol. The styling also brought a symbolic association with church architecture, making it fit into the YMCA's value system.

=== Mississippi ===
- YMCA Building (Oxford, Mississippi), a Mississippi Landmark.
- YMCA Building (Starkville, Mississippi), a Mississippi Landmark.

=== Missouri ===
- Paseo YMCA, Kansas City, Missouri, listed on the NRHP in Missouri.
- Principia Page-Park YMCA Gymnasium, St. Louis, Missouri, listed on the NRHP in Missouri.

=== Montana ===
- Bozeman YMCA, Bozeman, Montana, listed on the NRHP in Montana.
- YMCA Building (Great Falls, Montana), listed on the National Register of Historic Places in Cascade County, Montana.

=== Nebraska ===
- McCook YMCA, McCook, Nebraska, listed on the NRHP in Nebraska.
- Fremont Family YMCA, Fremont, Nebraska, the largest YMCA in the United States.

=== New Jersey ===
- Jersey City YMCA, Jersey City, New Jersey, listed on the NRHP in New Jersey.
- Wayne YMCA, now part of the Metro YMCA of the Oranges, was originally a YM-YWHA (Young Men-Young Women Hebrew Association) chapter.

=== New Mexico ===
- YMCA building (1907), designed by Trost & Trost, on New Mexico State University campus. Listed on the National Register as Air Science.

=== New York ===
- YMCA Building (Albany, New York), listed on the National Register of Historic Places in Albany, New York.
- YMCA Central Building (Buffalo, New York), Buffalo, New York, listed on the NRHP in Erie County, New York.
- Sloane House YMCA, West 34th Street, New York City, which was the largest residential YMCA in the U.S.A.
- Old Poughkeepsie YMCA, Poughkeepsie, New York, listed on the NRHP as "Young Men's Christian Association".
- United States Post Office (Canandaigua, New York), now used by the YMCA and listed on the NRHP in Ontario County, New York.

=== North Carolina ===
- Spruce Street YMCA, Winston-Salem, North Carolina, listed on the NRHP in North Carolina.
- Harris YMCA, Charlotte, North Carolina, listed on the NRHP in North Carolina.

=== Ohio ===
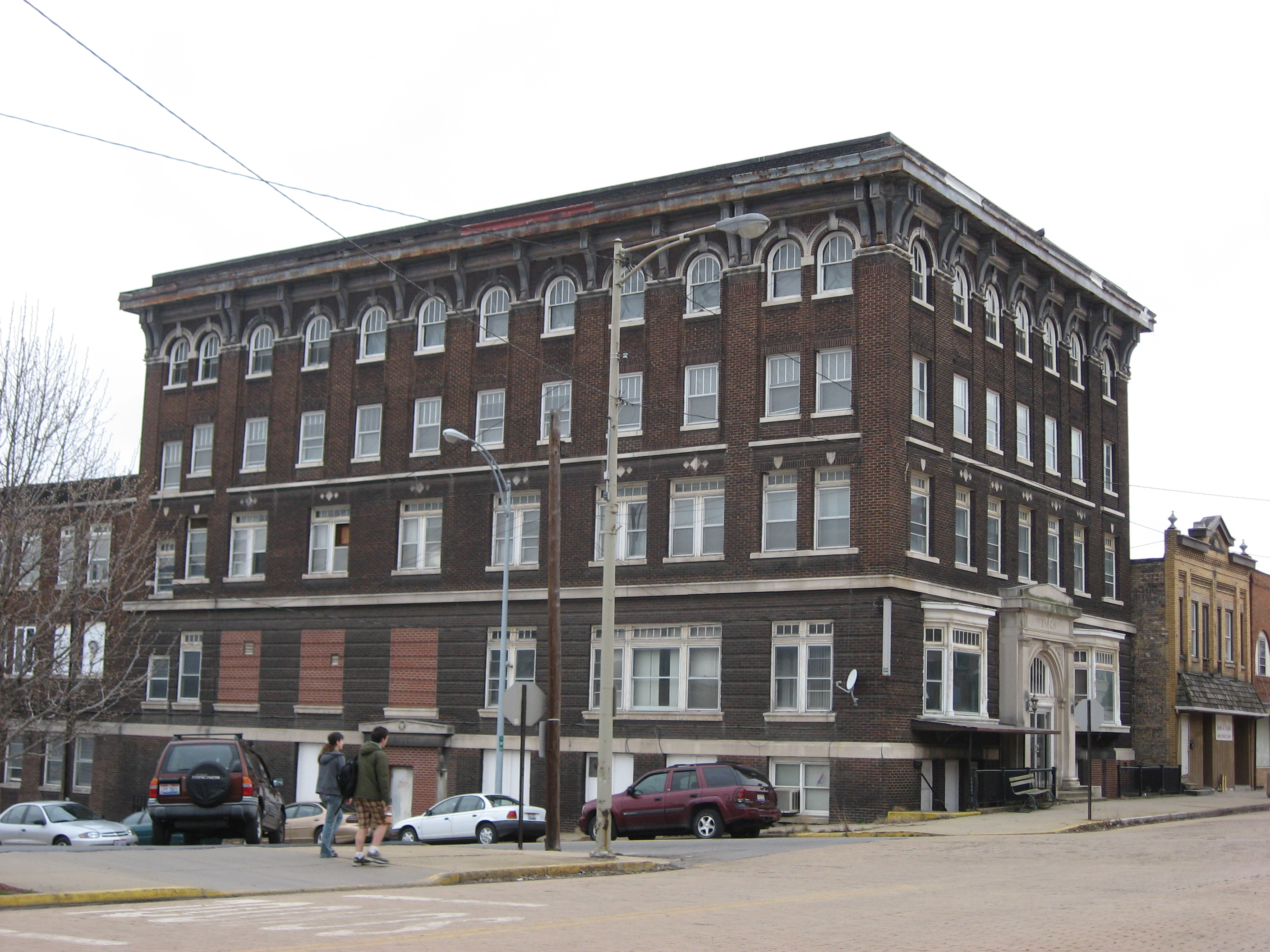
YMCA (East Liverpool, Ohio)

- Akron YMCA Building, Akron, Ohio, listed on the NRHP in Ohio.
- Brewster Railroad YMCA/Wandle House, Brewster, Ohio, listed on the NRHP in Ohio.
- YMCA Building, Columbus, Ohio, listed on the NRHP in Ohio.
- Central YMCA (Cleveland, Ohio), listed on the NRHP in Ohio.
- YMCA (East Liverpool, Ohio), NRHP-listed, Classical Revival architecture.
- Lorain YMCA Building, Lorain, Ohio, listed on the NRHP in Ohio.
- Steubenville YMCA Building, Steubenville, Ohio, listed on the NRHP in Ohio.
- Central YMCA (Toledo, Ohio), listed on the NRHP in Ohio.
- Zanesville YMCA, Zanesville, Ohio, listed on the NRHP in Ohio.

=== Oregon ===
- Sellwood Branch YMCA, Portland, Oregon, listed on the NRHP in Oregon.

=== Pennsylvania ===
- Thomas Beaver Free Library and Danville YMCA, Danville, Pennsylvania, listed on the NRHP in Pennsylvania.
- YMCA Philadelphia, Philadelphia, Pennsylvania, listed on the NRHP as "Young Men's Christian Association", is a building in the "Art Deco" style of architecture, designed by Louis E. Jallade and built 1926 to 1928. It has since been converted into condominiums.

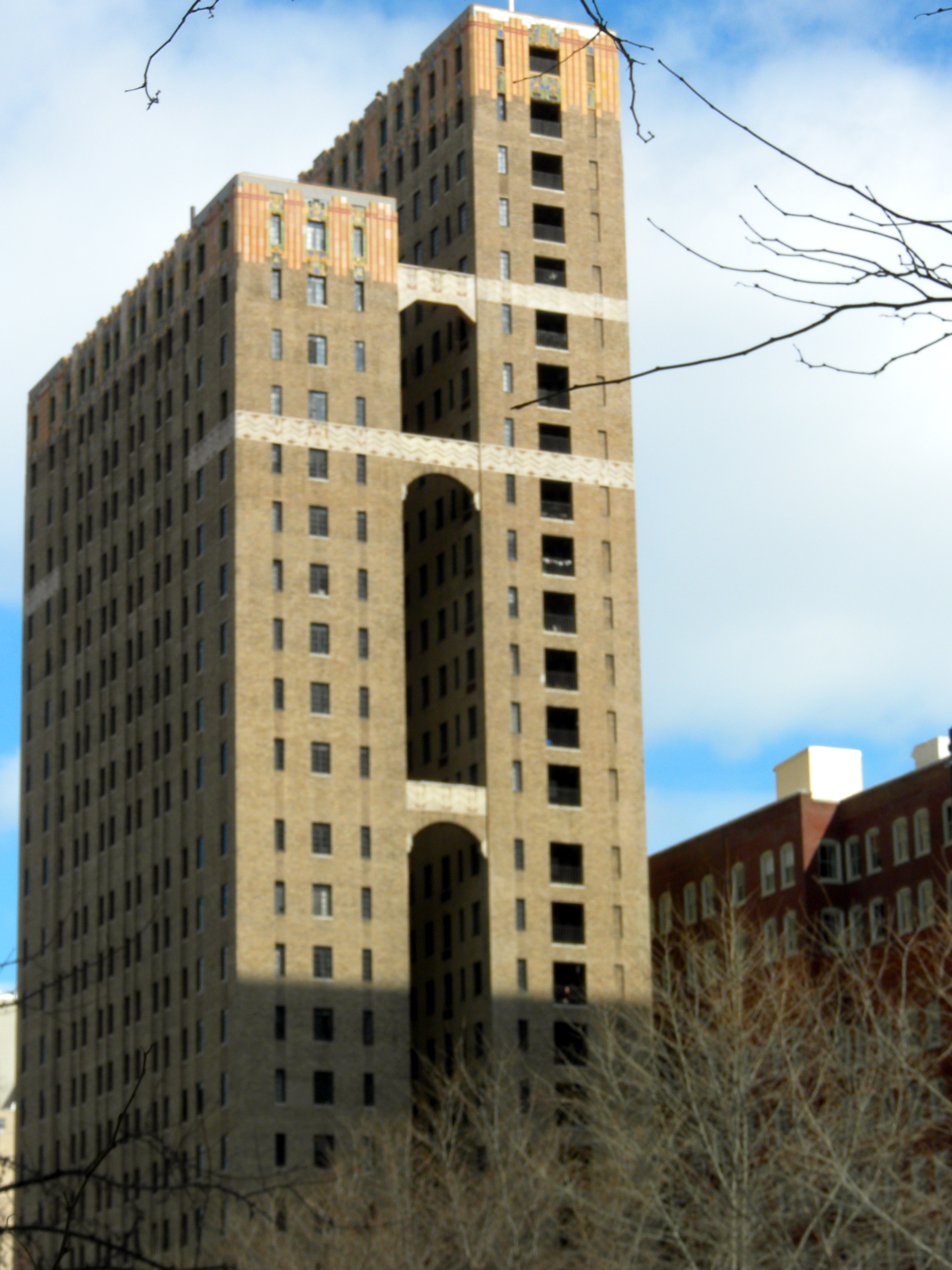
Y.M.C.A. Armed Forces Building in Philadelphia

=== Rhode Island ===
- Army and Navy YMCA, Newport, Rhode Island, listed on the NRHP in Rhode Island.

=== Tennessee ===
- Knoxville YMCA Building, Knoxville, Tennessee, listed on the NRHP in Tennessee.
- Leslie M. Stratton YMCA, Memphis, Tennessee, listed on the NRHP in Tennessee.

=== Texas ===
- Beaumont YMCA, Beaumont, Texas, listed on the NRHP in Texas.

=== Washington ===
- YMCA Building (Tacoma, Washington), listed on the National Register of Historic Places in Pierce County, Washington.

=== West Virginia ===
- YMCA May Building (Huntington, West Virginia), either of two buildings of the Huntington YMCA, founded 1895, in downtown Huntington:
  - its first dedicated building, constructed 1931, relinquished later, in use by Huntington hospice in 2022
  - its third building, in YMCA use for swimming, racquetball, and more in 2022. It was renovated in 2011 for $500,000.

=== Wisconsin ===
- Baasen House-German YMCA, Milwaukee, Wisconsin, listed on the NRHP in Wisconsin.
- YMCA Building (Racine, Wisconsin), listed on the National Register of Historic Places in Racine County, Wisconsin.

== See also ==
- List of YWCA buildings
- YMCA Sign, Fargo, North Dakota
- 92nd Street Y (92nd Street Young Men's and Young Women's Hebrew Association [YM-YWHA], New York City)
- Young Men's and Young Women's Hebrew Association Building, Baltimore, Maryland
