= Fulk-Arkansas Democrat Building =

- U.S. National Register of Historic Places
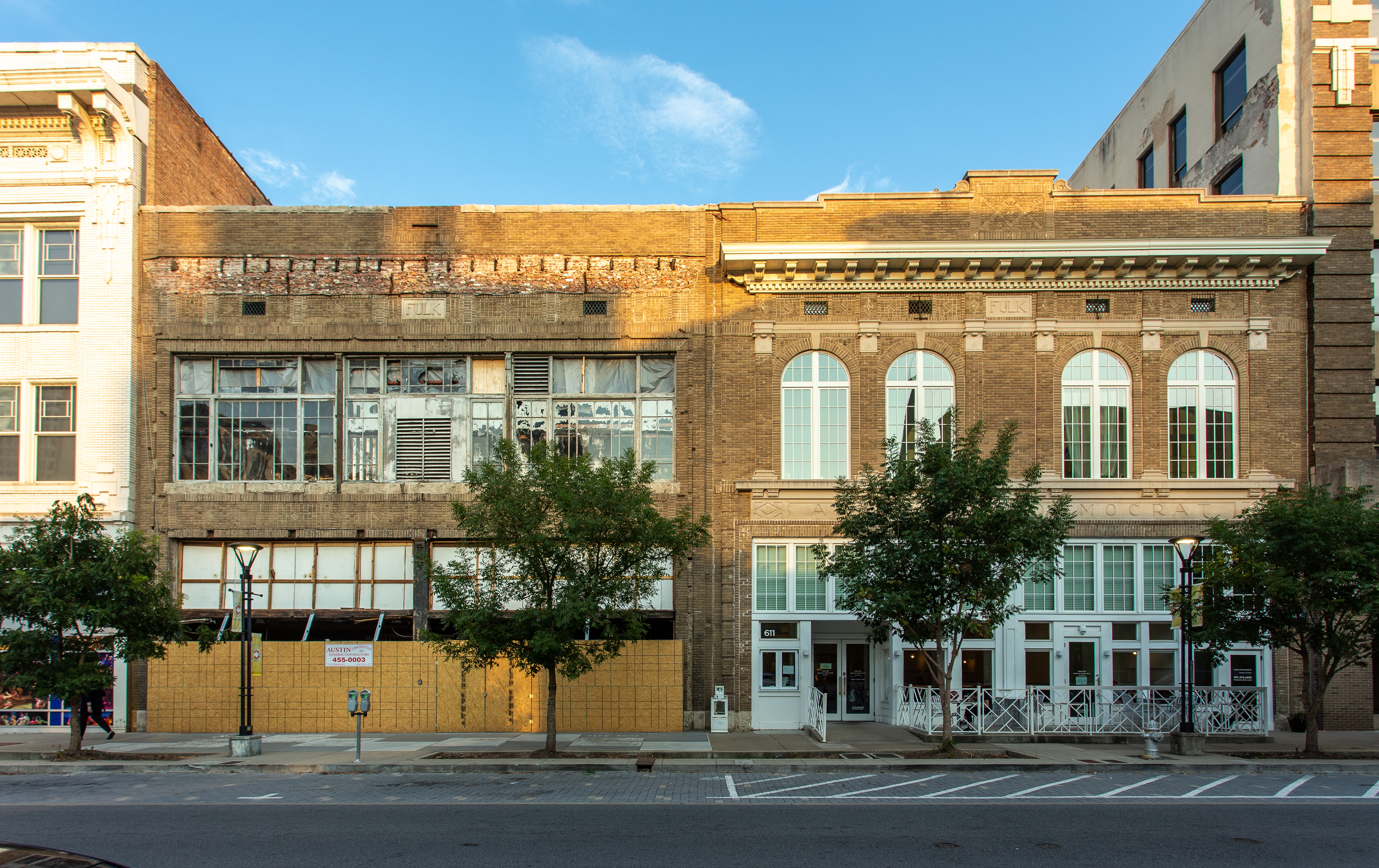

- Location within Arkansas Location within the United States
- Location: 613-615 Main St., Little Rock, Arkansas
- Coordinates: 34°44′34″N 92°16′17″W
- Area: less than one acre
- Built: 1916; 110 years ago
- Architect: Charles L. Thompson
- Architectural style: Classical Revival
- NRHP reference No.: 100002456
- Added to NRHP: May 18, 2018

The Fulk-Arkansas Democrat Building is a historic newspaper headquarters building at 613-615 Main Street in Little Rock, Arkansas. It was built in 1916 by the estate of Francis Fulk, a prominent local judge, and was designed by Charles L. Thompson. It was built on the foundation of a 1911 structure (also a Thompson design) that was destroyed by fire before it was finished. It was occupied by the Arkansas Democrat newspaper from 1917 until 1930, when it moved to the YMCA–Democrat Building. The building is of architectural importance for its association with Thompson, and its surviving Classical Revival details.

The building was converted to apartments around 2016.

The building was listed on the National Register of Historic Places in 2018.

== See also ==
- National Register of Historic Places listings in Little Rock, Arkansas
