= YMCA Building (San Diego) =

Historic Army-Navy YMCA building in San Diego

The Guild Hotel
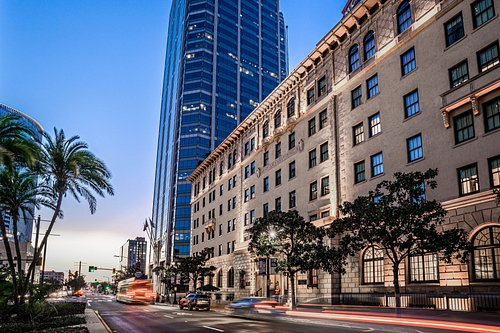
- The Building on Broadway St.
- Interactive map of the The Guild Hotel area
- Alternative names: San Diego Tribute Portfolio

General information
- Type: Hotel
- Architectural style: Italian Renaissance Revival
- Location: 500 W Broadway, San Diego, CA 92101
- Opened: 1924
- Renovated: 2019
- Renovation cost: $80 million
- Owner: Oram Hotels
- Landlord: Oram Hotels
- Affiliation: Marriott Tribute Portfolio

Technical details
- Floor count: 7

Design and construction
- Architect: Lincoln Rogers
- Developer: YMCA
- Main contractor: Campbell Building Company

Other information
- Number of rooms: 162

Website
- https://theguildhotel.com/
- Army-Navy YMCA Building
- U.S. National Register of Historic Places
- Location within San Diego County, California Location within California Location within the United States
- Area: Downtown San Diego
- NRHP reference No.: 07001177
- Added to NRHP: November 15, 2007

The Army-Navy YMCA Building is a historic building in San Diego, California. It was built in 1924, and added to the National Register of Historic Places in 2007, before the YMCA moved out in 2014. During that time, the group served over 125 million military personnel in the facility. The building now houses the luxury Guild Hotel, a member of the Marriott Tribute Portfolio.

== History ==
Civic leader George Marston organized the first YMCA in San Diego in 1882. In 1921, the Army & Navy YMCA was established to serve soldiers but quickly ran out of space, so Marston again stepped in to lead the effort to construct a new building. Colonel Ed Fletcher secured the property on Broadway because it would be accessible to soldiers as it is within walking distance of both Navy Pier and Santa Fe Depot. Lincoln Rogers, a former Commander of the Naval Civil Engineer Corps, designed the building which opened in 1924.

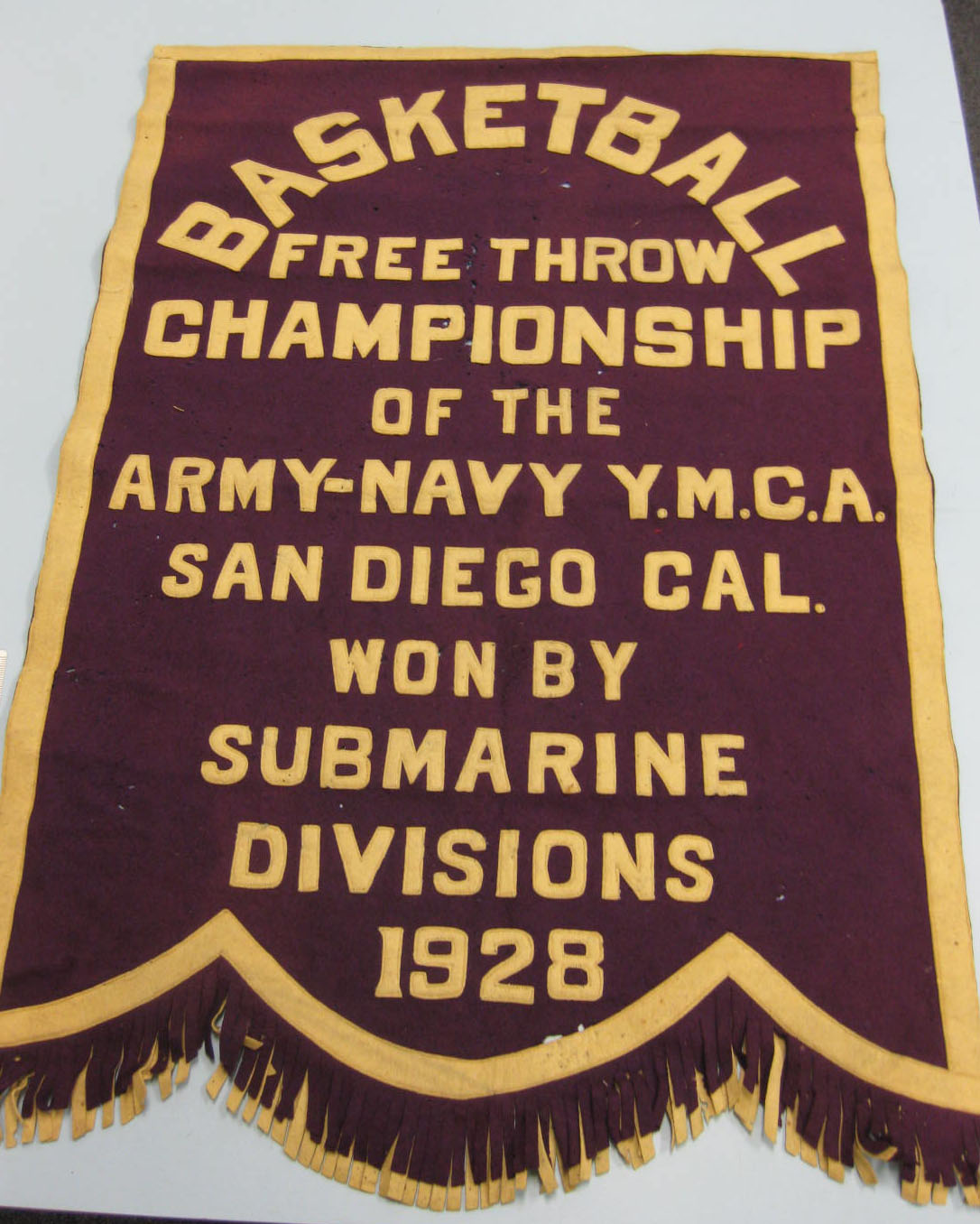
1928 basketball banner

During World War II, San Diego became a focal point of the military effort, and the YMCA was often their first stop. Starting in 1941, cots were set up in hallways to accommodate the influx of men. During this period, the organization had a record press which they would use to record a soldier's voice and send a "talk-a-letter" home to their family. In 1948, the group renamed itself to "Armed Forces YMCA" to include the Air Force. The same year, the organization installed a revolving "YMCA" sign on the roof.

By 1972, the Y signed a contract with American Youth Hostel to lease some of their increasingly unused rooms. In 1974, female soldiers were able to rent rooms for the first time. Increasingly, the U.S. Military's Special Services provided for social needs of sailors that previously were provided by the YMCA. The Armed Forces YMCA initially moved their services to naval facilities in the 1970s and later moved again to the Murphy Canyon area in 2014. During that period, the building's upper floors were rented as the 500 West Hotel while the basement was rented by the downtown YMCA, a separate civilian branch of the organization. In 1999, Michael Galasso purchased the building, but it later fell into bankruptcy.

In 2014, Alvin Mansour bought the building for $14 million with Oram Hotels co-founder, Kevin Mansour, for a planned redevelopment. After the $80 million renovation, the Guild Hotel opened in 2019 as part of the Marriott Tribute Portfolio. Whereas the low-cost hotel had 259 rooms which rented from $49–69 per night, the new hotel had 162 rooms that rented from $250 to more than $400.

In 2020, less than a year after the opening, the original restaurants closed as a result of the COVID-19 pandemic in California and never reopened. At the height of the pandemic, fewer than a dozen employees worked at the hotel.

In 2023, the Be Saha Hospitality Group opened new restaurants as the business recovered. At the end of that year, the hotel hosted a Great Gatsby themed party to celebrate the building's centennial.

== Architecture ==
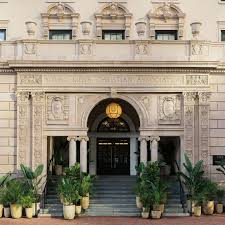
The elaborate entrance pavilion with paired Ionic columns

The Italian Renaissance Revival style building consists of six stories plus a basement all made of reinforced concrete. The first story has a rusticated surface. Sixth-story brackets support a flat roof with ceramic tiles. Above that is a penthouse with coved fascia and a standing seam copper roof. Finally, a YMCA sign is on top.

The facade is detailed with Classical balconies, pronounced belt courses, and a brown terra cotta banner below 5th floor reading "Army and Navy YMCA 1924". Quoins and twisted gutters also made of terra cotta demarcate both the corners and the entrance. This entrance sits within an elaborate central pavilion with flanking bays under a broken pediment supported by paired Ionic columns. Stairs enter through a recessed vestibule with barrel vaults. Above, a terra cotta frieze reads "Young Men's Christian Association".

The original interior was comparatively simple. The center of the building held a two-story gymnasium with a running track around the 2nd level, while an Olympic-size swimming pool was located in the basement.

During the conversion to the Guild Hotel, the main challenge was turning the dormitory-style room layouts into that of a traditional hotel. Interior designer Sormeh Rienne, née Azad, of Incommon Design coordinated the transformation of the interior. The two-story basketball court became a ballroom, while the basement swimming pool became a multi-purpose room decorated with vintage photos. A fluted hand-carved reception desk was added to the lobby and the building's original blueprints, which were discovered inside a wall during remodeling, were framed and hung in the entrance.

In contrast, during the redevelopment, the exterior of the building was largely retained without significant alteration. While the courtyard became a restaurant with firepits, the YMCA sign atop the roof remained.

== Gallery ==
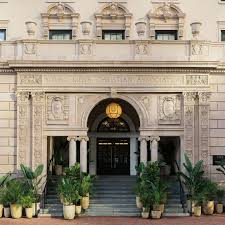
Front entrance below balcony

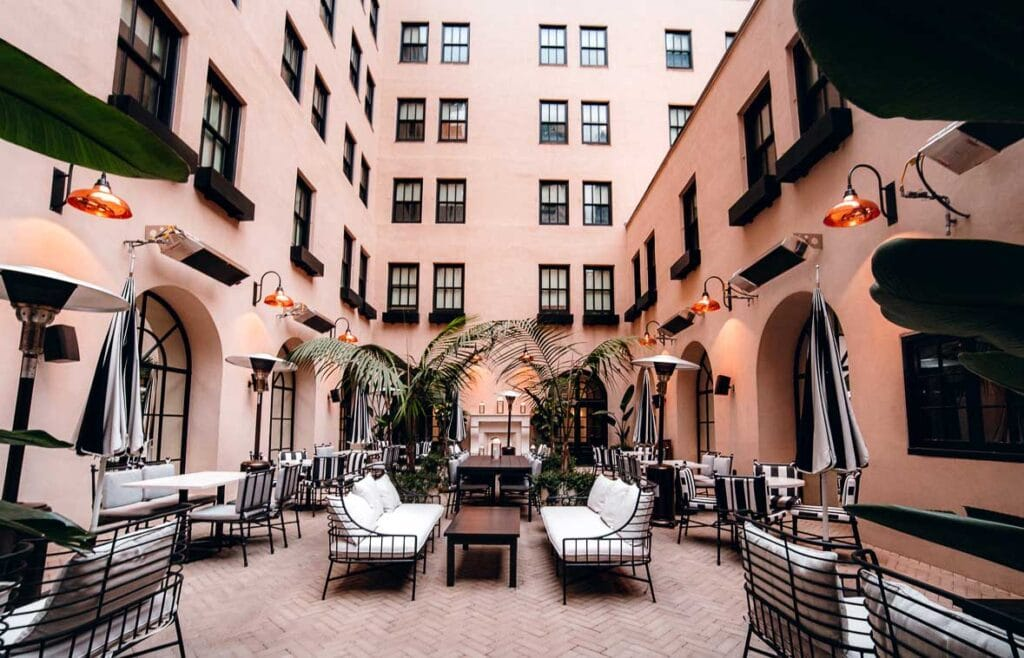
Interior courtyard restaurant

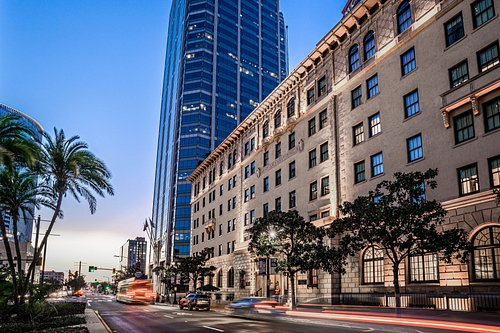
Hotel facade with One America Plaza

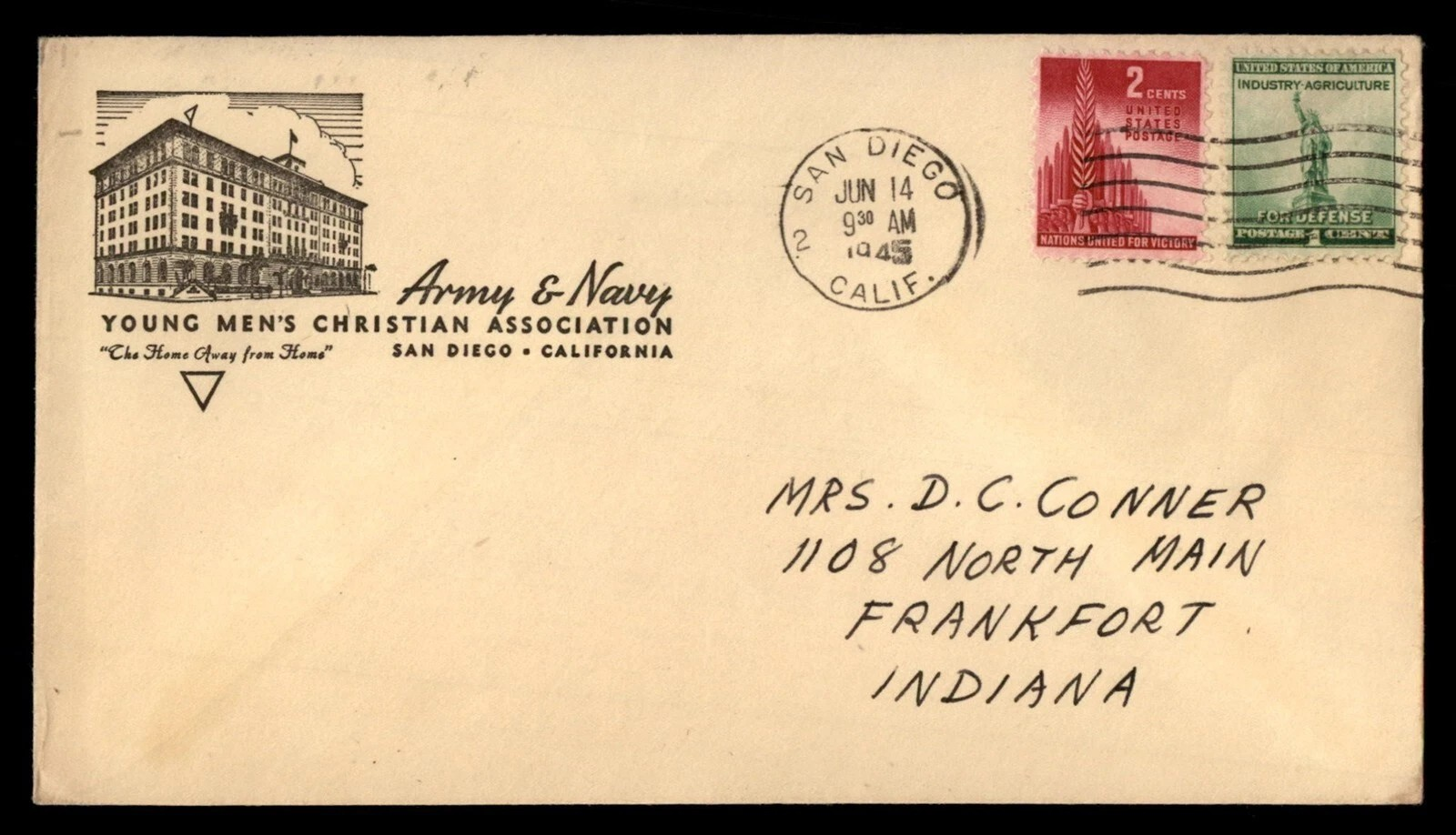
Letter home during World War II

== See also ==
- Army and Navy YMCA
- List of YMCA buildings
- U.S. Grant Hotel
- National Register of Historic Places listings in San Diego County, California
