= Sloane House YMCA =

Coordinates: 40°45′10.72″N 73°59′45.43″W

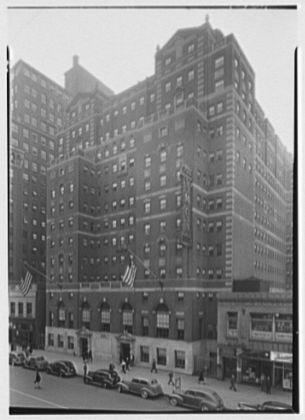
The Sloan House

The William Sloane House YMCA at 356 West 34th Street in Manhattan was the largest residential YMCA building in the nation.

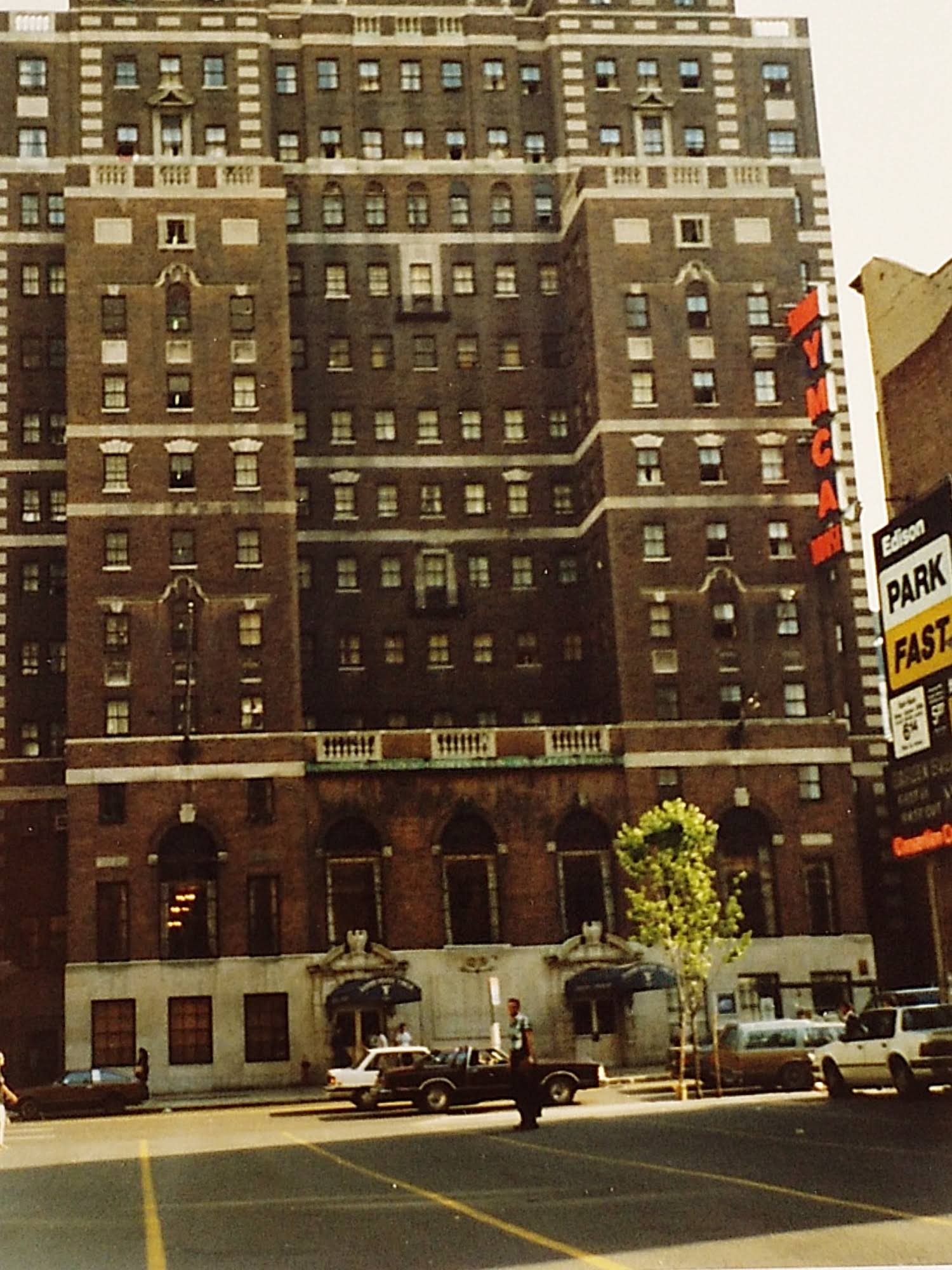
William Sloane House YMCA 1988

It was sold in 1993 for $5 million and later converted to rental apartments. At the time, its closure and sale was noted as part of a trend of fewer budget travelers choosing to stay at YMCAs. Paper related to its tenure as a YMCA building are located are archived at the University of Minnesota.

As of 2023, it is owned and managed by Kibel Company.

== See also ==
- List of YMCA buildings
