= YMCA Building (Shreveport, Louisiana) =

Historic clubhouse in Shreveport, Louisiana

- YMCA, Downtown Branch
- U.S. National Register of Historic Places
- U.S. Historic district – Contributing property
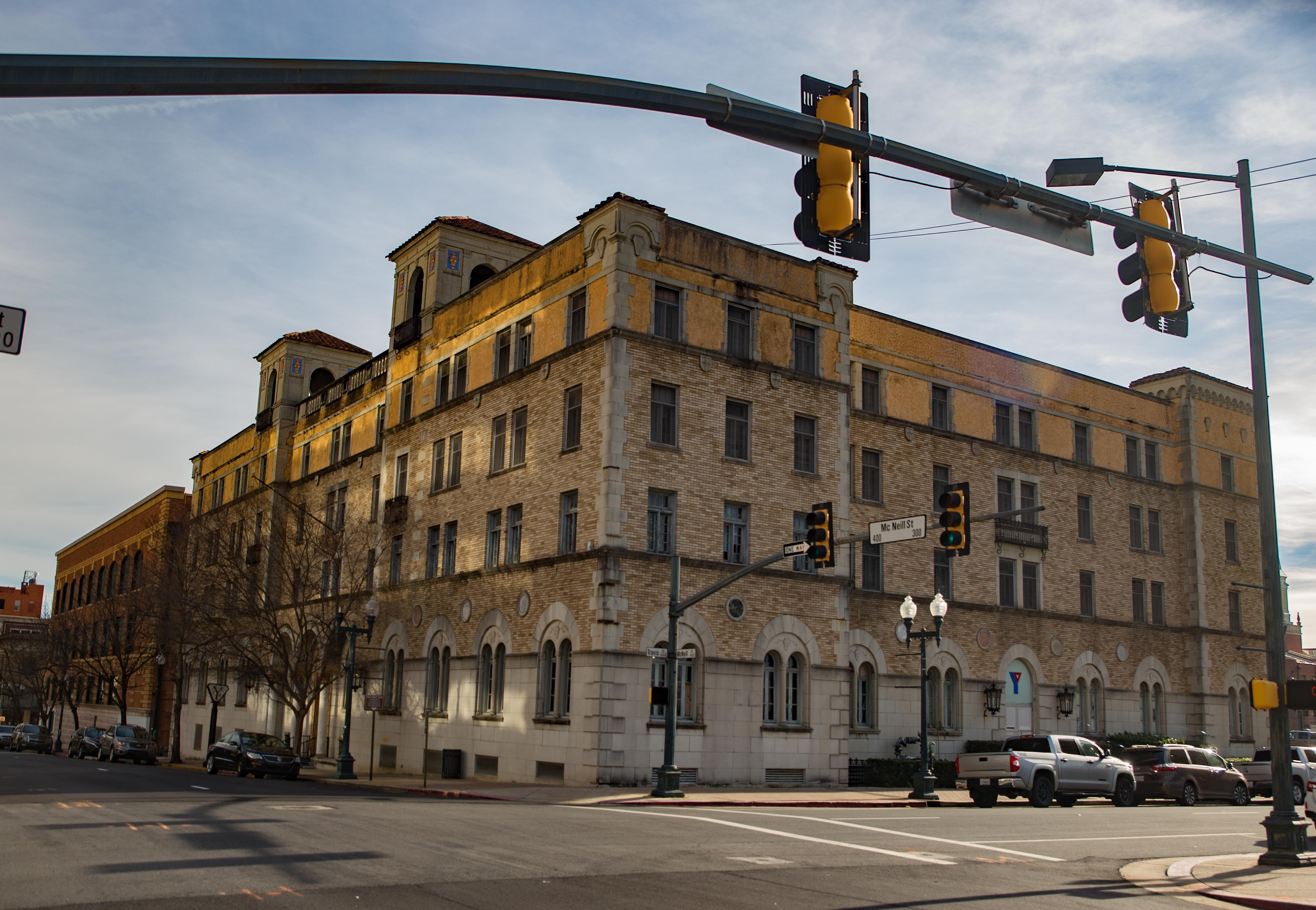
- Front of the building, left, with twin campaniles

- Location within Louisiana Location within the United States
- Location: 400 McNeil Street, Shreveport, Louisiana 71101
- Coordinates: 32°30′46″N 93°45′05″W
- Built: 1925
- Architect: Clarence W. King
- Owner: YMCA of Northwest Louisiana
- Architectural style: Italian Renaissance Revival
- Website: www.ymcanwla.org/locations/downtown-ymca/
- Part of: Shreveport Commercial Historic District (First Boundary Increase) (ID97000437)
- NRHP reference No.: 91000621

Significant dates
- Added to NRHP: May 28, 1991
- Designated CP: May 16, 1997

The YMCA Building is a historic building in downtown Shreveport, Louisiana, built in 1925. The National Register of Historic Places listed the Young Men’s Christian Association structure in 1982.

== History ==
The YMCA first started as a group in Shreveport in the 1860s but did not formally incorporate until 1922. The next year, the group raised $545,000 (equivalent to $10,298,584 in 2025) to build this building which opened in 1925. Monroe E. Dodd, the First Baptist Church pastor and Edward Jacobs, the National Bank of Shreveport founder, both strongly advocated for the project.

In the 1960s, the YMCA added a third and fourth story for new bedrooms and converted the old residences on the second story into exercise rooms. The group stopped renting the rooms though and the floors are now vacant. In 2017, barrels of food from 1963 were found in an unused wing of the building, left over from Cold War Civil Defense preparations.

In recent years, the facility attracts downtown office workers to work out and provides exercise classes. In 2020, the YMCA renovated the building which included updating the front desk area and CrossFit room, replacing lockers, and converting the underutilized social room into a yoga and Pilates studio. In addition to the main building, the YMCA of Northwest Louisiana maintains two Shreveport neighborhood branches as of 2024.

== Architecture ==
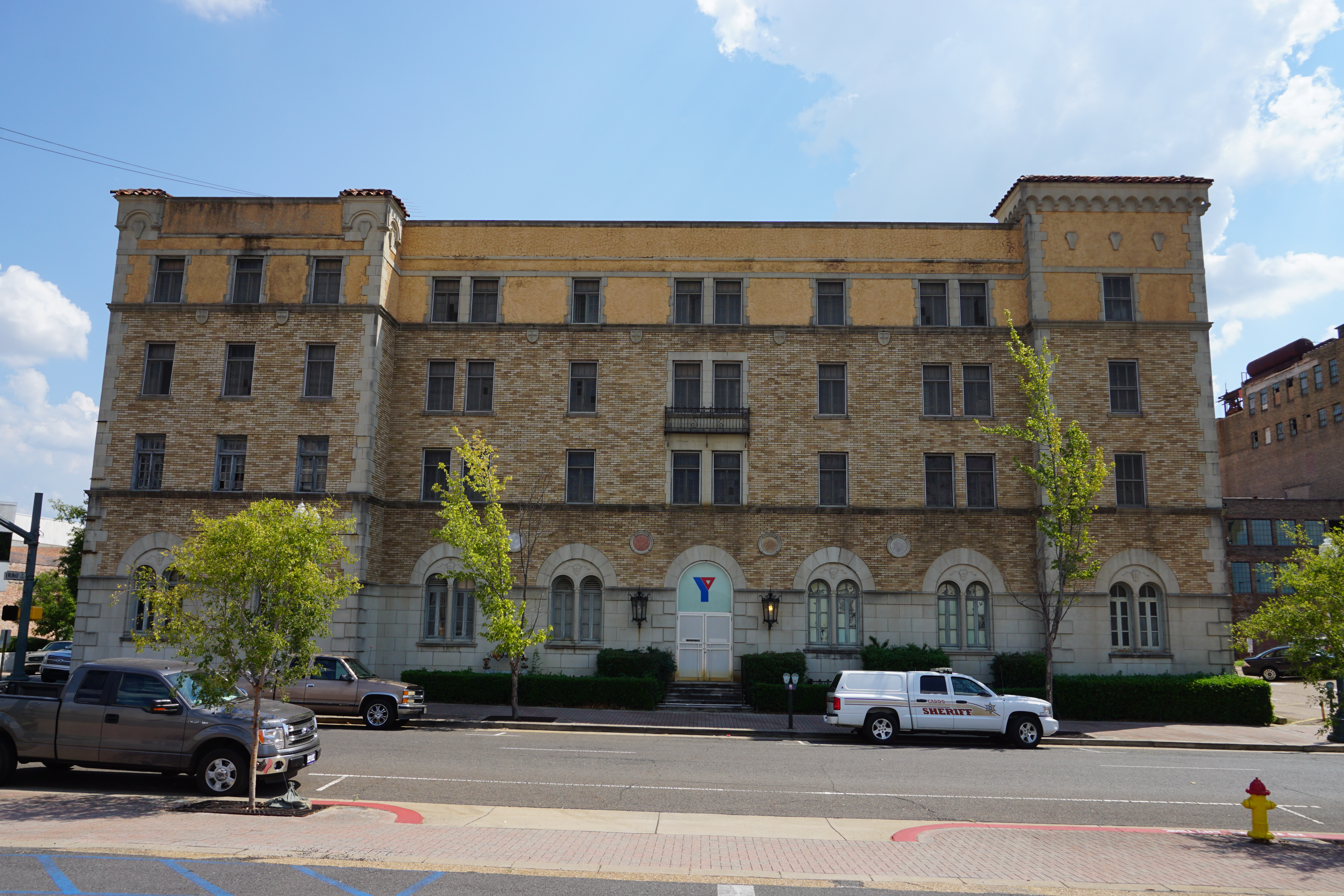
Side entrance along Travis Street

The Villa Medici in Rome, completed in 1544, inspired architect Clarence W. King to design the building in an Italian Renaissance Revival style. The four-story building is built using blond brick and cast concrete with quoining along the corners.

Outside, the front facade includes twin rooftop campaniles with a balustrade running between. The ground story has rows of arched opening each with double arched windows with a central colonnette. Between these are oeil-de-boeuf motifs. The main entrance consists of a triple arch opening flanked by pilasters and topped with a segmental pediment. Gold and blue terra cotta decorations highlight both the campaniles and the entrance.

Inside, a central lobby consists of octagonal piers leading up to a plaster mock groin vaulted ceiling. Behind the lobby, is a small cortile with a fountain set in a tiled niche. The rest of the original interior included two gymnasiums, numerous bedrooms upstairs, and a pool in the basement.

== See also ==
- List of YMCA buildings
- National Register of Historic Places listings in Caddo Parish, Louisiana
