= YMCA Sign =

Historic sign in Fargo, North Dakota

- Fargo-Moorhead YMCA Sign
- U.S. National Register of Historic Places
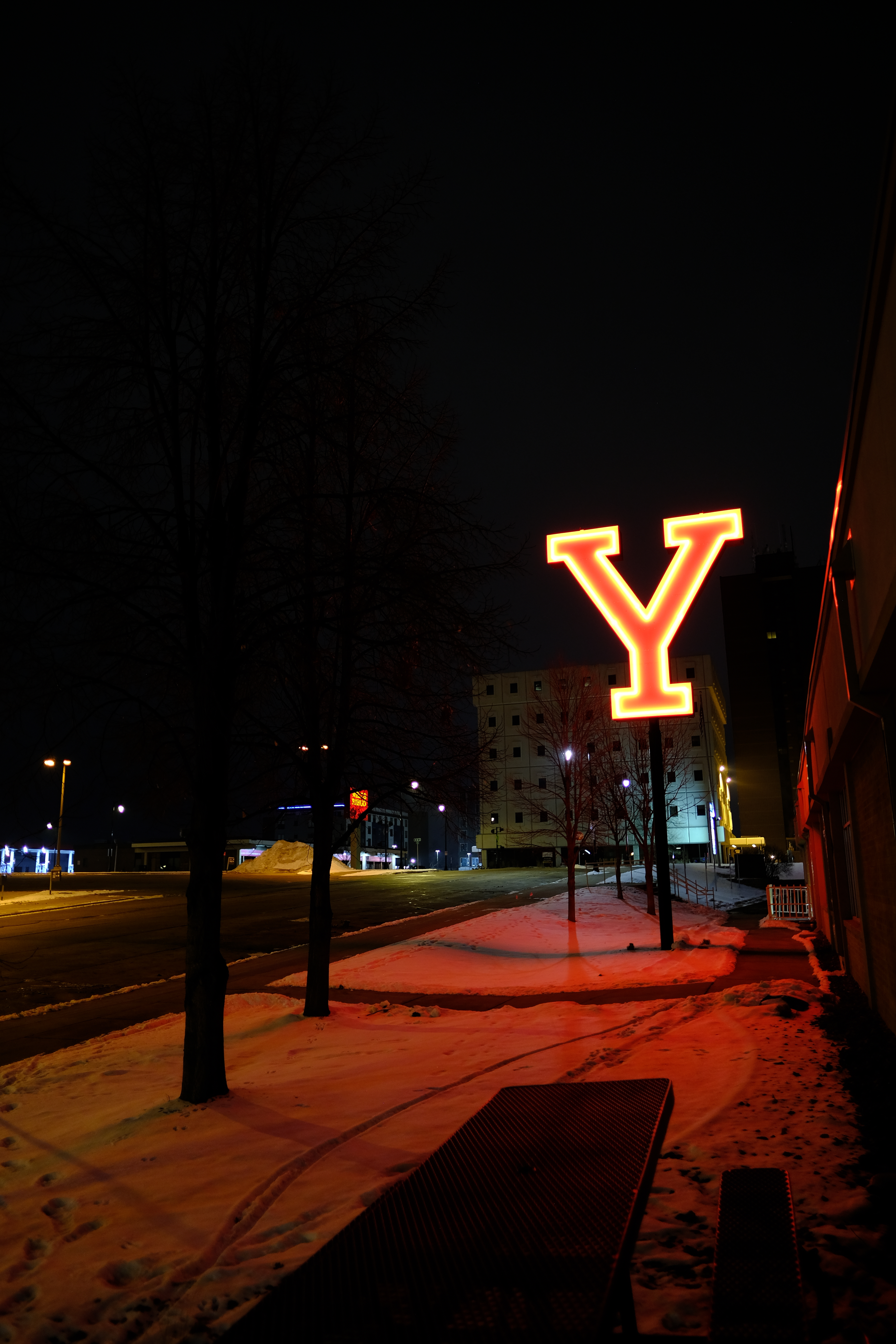
- The neon sign at night

- Location within North Dakota Location within the United States
- Location: 400 1st Avenue South, Fargo, North Dakota 58103
- Coordinates: 46°52′23″N 96°47′11″W
- Built: 1962
- Built by: Cook Sign Company
- Architectural style: Americana
- Website: www.ymcacassclay.org
- NRHP reference No.: 100004062
- Added to NRHP: March 17, 2022

The YMCA Sign is a neon sign in front of the YMCA in downtown Fargo, North Dakota. It is listed on the National Register of Historic Places.

== History ==
Starting in 1959, fundraising began to build the Fargo-Moorhead Family YMCA and contributions totaled $1.2 million. This was the first time over a million dollars had been donated for a project in the history of Fargo. The new branch opened in 1962 with 801 members.

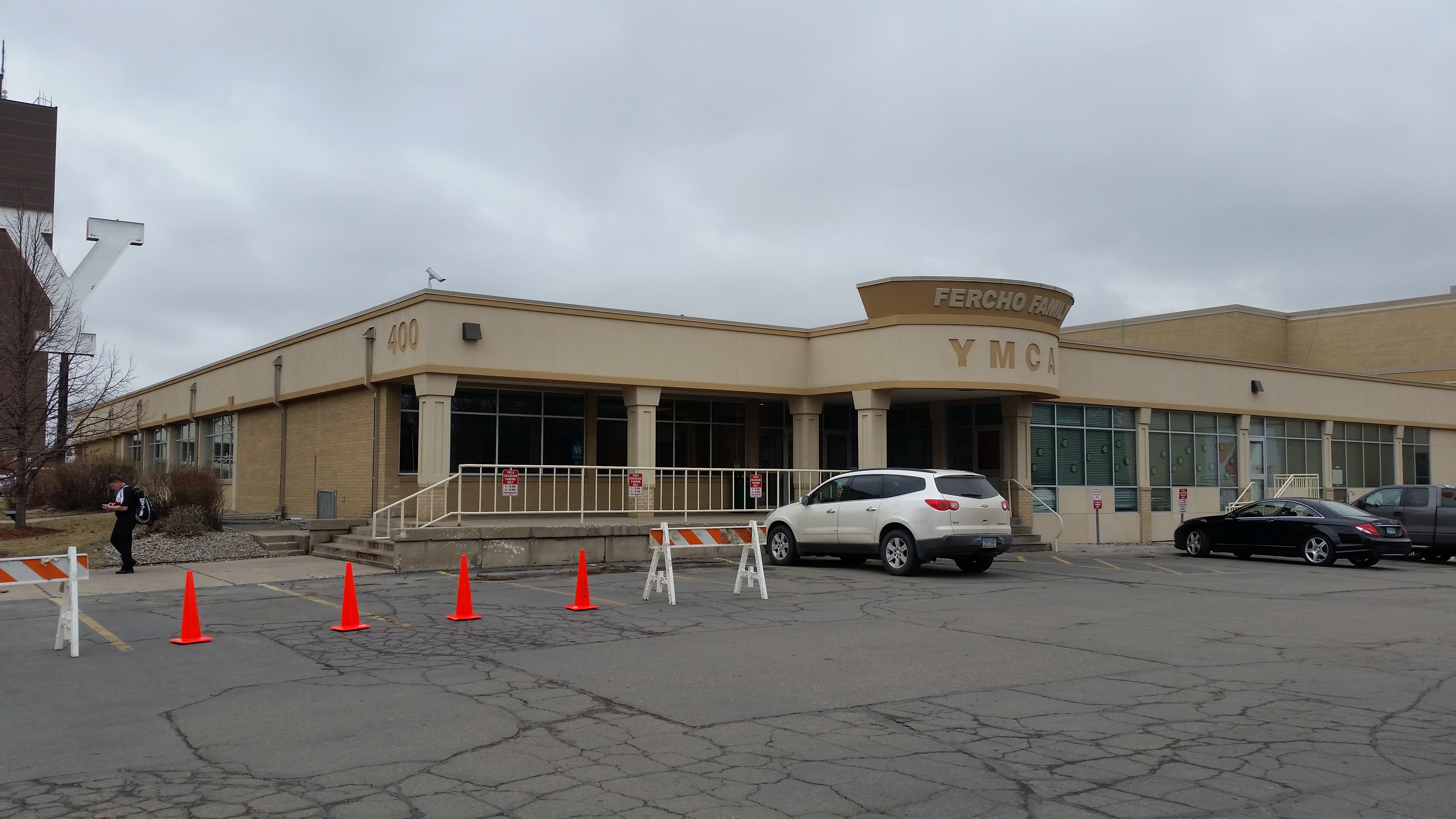
The sign during the day with the YMCA building to the right

The Cook Sign Company constructed the sign in 1962, just after the building opened. In the subsequent years, Cook increasingly shifted toward producing similar electric signs because the 1965 Highway Beautification Act sharply reduced their sale of billboards. The local Fargo business lasted much longer than most signage companies, operating from 1897 to 2009.

In 2009, the YMCA of Cass and Clay Counties changed the name of the branch to the "Fercho Family YMCA". This honored Dr. Cal and Doris Fercho, two long-term benefactors.

In 2022, the national YMCA issued new branding guidelines to chapters which disallowed leaving up any exceptions. In order to preserve the non-conforming sign, the local YMCA successfully applied for listing it on the National Register of Historic Places.

== Architecture ==
The aluminum sign is representative of 1960s Americana and consists of a "Y" on a post. The serif font letter is 16 feet wide and 18 feet tall. The sides are cherry red, the faces are white, and a neon tubing runs along the edges.

== See also ==
- List of YMCA buildings
- National Register of Historic Places listings in Cass County, North Dakota
- Downtown Fargo District
