= Downtown Cumberland Historic District =

Historic district in Maryland, United States

- U.S. National Register of Historic Places
- U.S. Historic district
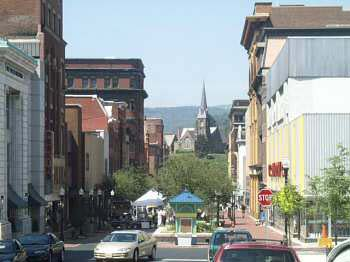

- Location within Maryland Location within the United States
- Location: Cumberland, Maryland
- Coordinates: 39°39′5″N 78°45′40″W
- Area: 21 acres (8.5 ha)
- Architect: Multiple
- Architectural style: Mixed (more Than 2 Styles From Different Periods)
- NRHP reference No.: 83002917
- Added to NRHP: August 4, 1983

The Downtown Cumberland Historic District, also referred to as the Downtown Cumberland Mall, is the main shopping and dining district for the city of Cumberland, Maryland.

== Location ==
The district is located in the heart of the downtown area along Baltimore Street, the formerly the main thoroughfare through the city. Baltimore Street is now a brick pedestrian mall. The street is lined with large multistory commercial buildings, most of which were built in the late 19th and early 20th centuries. These buildings, which were formerly banks, hotels, and department stores, are relics of the city's former wealth and importance during the industrial age. They now contain tourist oriented businesses such as sidewalk cafes, antique stores, boutiques and art galleries. Baltimore Street hosts some of the city's biggest sidewalk festivals and block parties. In the warmer months the weekly Farmers Market will draw hundreds downtown and often evenings there will be activities such as outdoor dining with live music or block parties.

== Downtown buildings ==
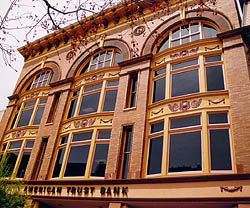
M&T Bank: Rosenbaum

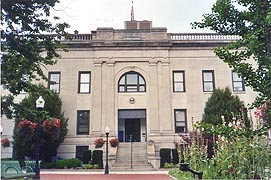
City Hall

== See also ==
- Canal Place
- Country Club Mall
- Cumberland YMCA
- CSX Transportation
