= William Conroy Honors Center =

- Air Science
- U.S. National Register of Historic Places
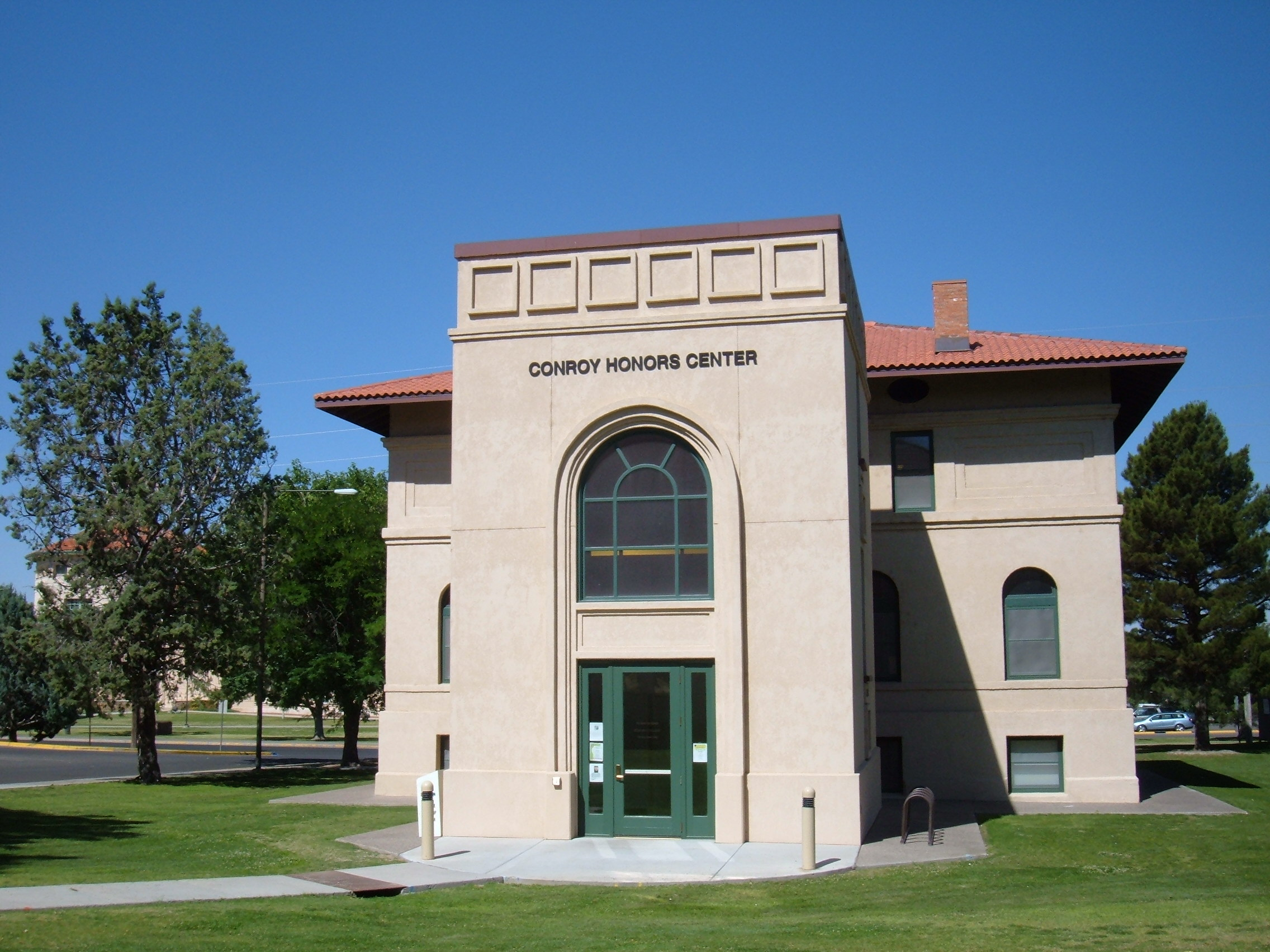
- Photo of east entrance, added in 2001. Notable arched entranceway is on front facade instead.

- Location within New Mexico
- Location: Northeast corner of N. Horseshoe and Espina St., NMSU, Las Cruces, New Mexico
- Coordinates: 32°17′00″N 106°45′19″W
- Area: 0.2 acres (0.081 ha)
- Built: 1907, 2001-2002
- Architect: Trost & Trost
- Architectural style: Mission/spanish Revival, California Mission Revival
- MPS: New Mexico Campus Buildings Built 1906--1937 TR
- NRHP reference No.: 88001546
- Added to NRHP: May 16, 1989

The William Conroy Honors Center, at the New Mexico State University in Las Cruces, New Mexico is a historic building which is listed on the National Register of Historic Places. It was built in 1907 as a Young Men's Christian Association building. It was designed by architects Trost & Trost. It was listed on the National Register of Historic Places in 1989 with the seemingly-odd name of Air Science; it then served as the Air Science building for NMSU.

It is a three-story California Mission Revival-style masonry and stucco building with a French tile hipped roof. It has an arched entryway. It was built with a brick exterior but that was later plastered over. It was used first as a YMCA, and later taken over by NMSU and used as its Air Science building.

It is located on the northeast corner of N. Horseshoe and Espina St., on the NMSU campus.

The building was retrofitted with an elevator in 2001–02, in an addition creating a new East entrance to the building.

It is listed as Building #35 in NMSU's inventory of buildings, as the William B. Conroy Honors Center, abbreviated WCHC, at 2745 South Espina St. The university also has an Air Test facility and a Wind Tunnel/Research building.
