= Fremont Family YMCA =

Largest YMCA in the United States

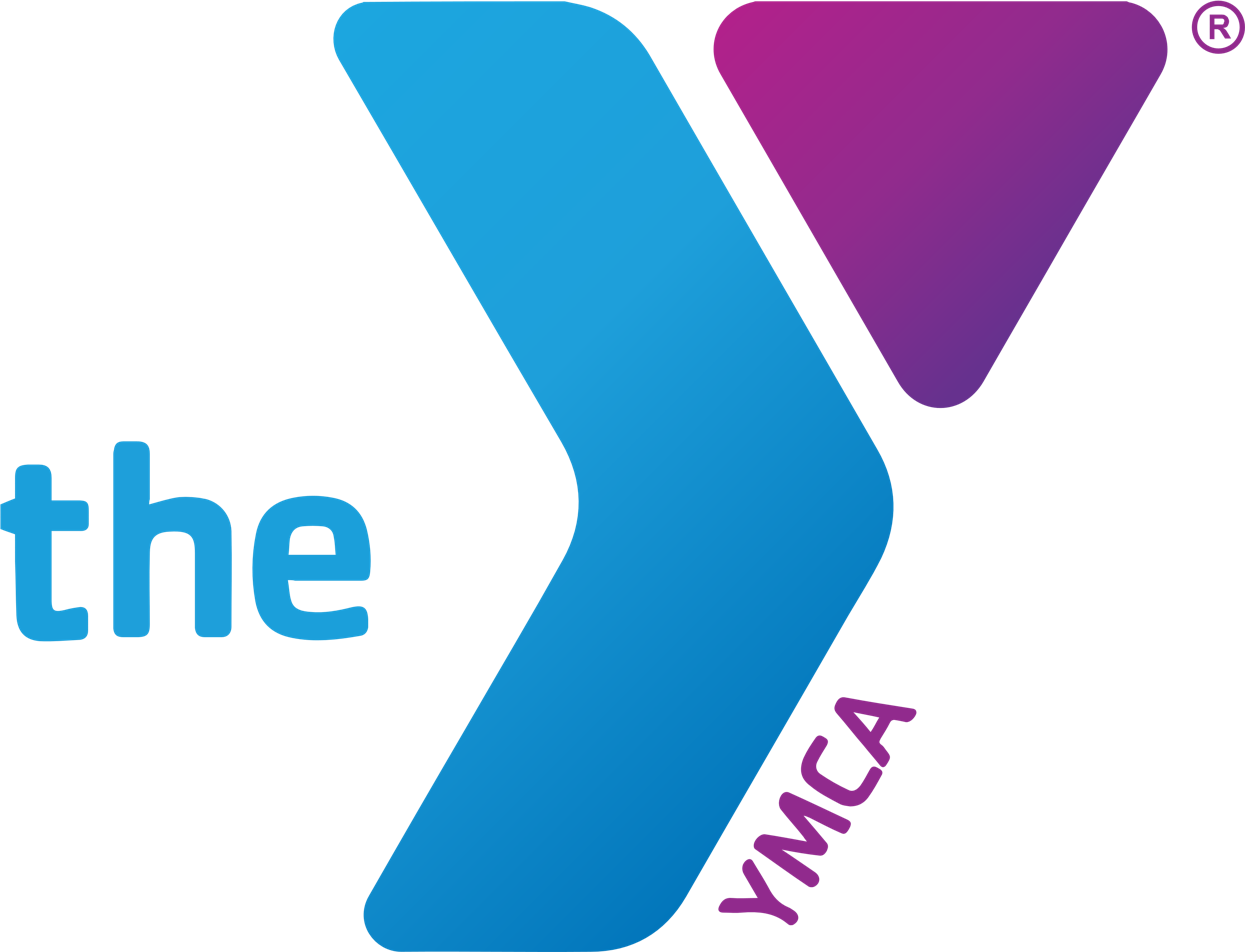

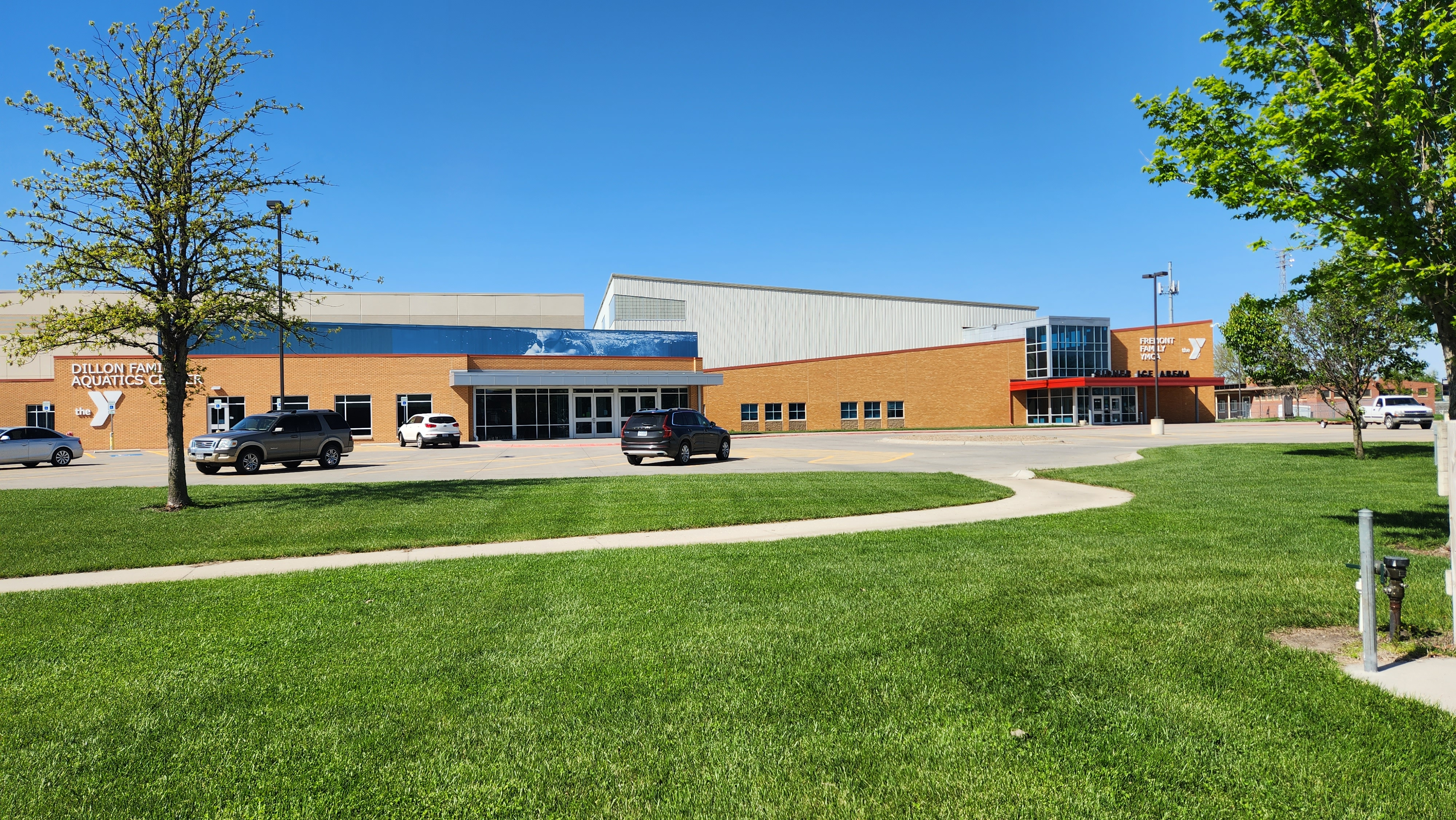
- Front of the Fremont Family YMCA, with the Dillon Family Aquatic Center and Sidner Ice Arena
- Formation: 1888; 138 years ago
- Location: Fremont, Nebraska, United States
- CEO: Lindy Hoyer
- Website: fremontfamilyymca.org

The Fremont Family YMCA is the largest YMCA in the United States located in Fremont, Nebraska. The organization was founded in 1888 and includes the Sidner Ice Arena, the Dillon Family Aquatic Center, the Hazel R. Keene Wellness Center, and the Sidner Family Sports Complex.

The first building opened in 1907 on 5th and Park streets. Prior to this, YMCA met in small rooms around Fremont. The current building opened in 1969. Groundbreaking ceremonies were held for the new facility in 1967.

In 1985, the Sidner Family Sports Complex opened. In 1992, $1.5 million was raised for renovations, a new tennis court, and a new gymnasium. In 2004, the Sidner Ice Arena opened. In 2006, the Hazel R. Keene Wellness Center opened. In 2018, the Dillon Family Aquatic Center opened.

== Sidner Ice Arena ==
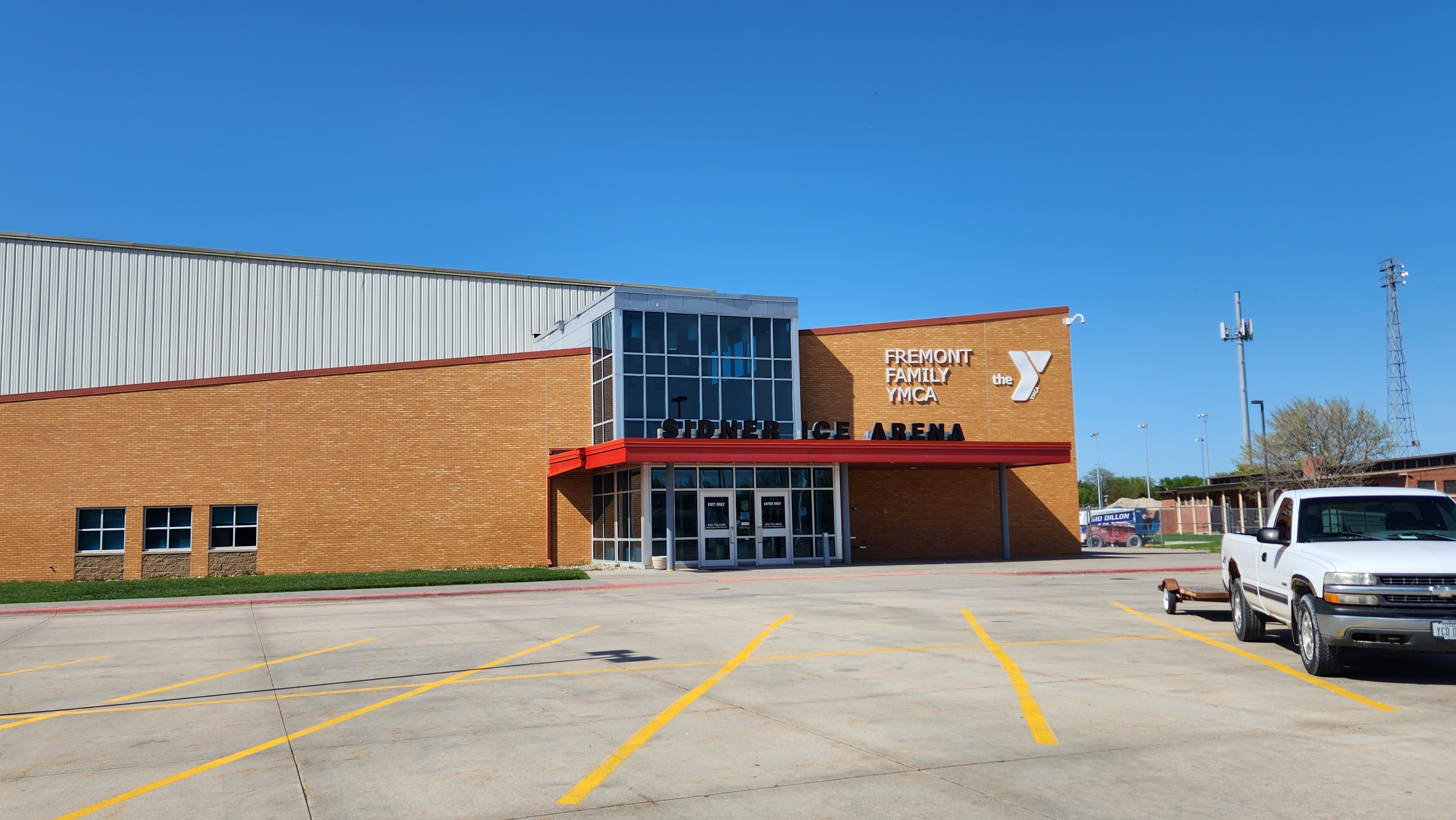
Front entrance of the Sidner Ice Arena.

The Sidner Ice Arena is an ice arena opened in 2004. Ice is melted in April, and re-installed in August. The arena was named after Evelyn Sidner, following her death in 1998.

In 2023, the ice rink fell into disrepair and had to be renovated. Local businessman Kent Johnson founded SETT LLC to help fund the project. They were able to raise $1.2 million within four months. The Sidner Ice Arena closed April 8, of the following year for renovations. The ice arena reopened in September following the completion of renovations.

== Dillon Family Aquatic Center ==
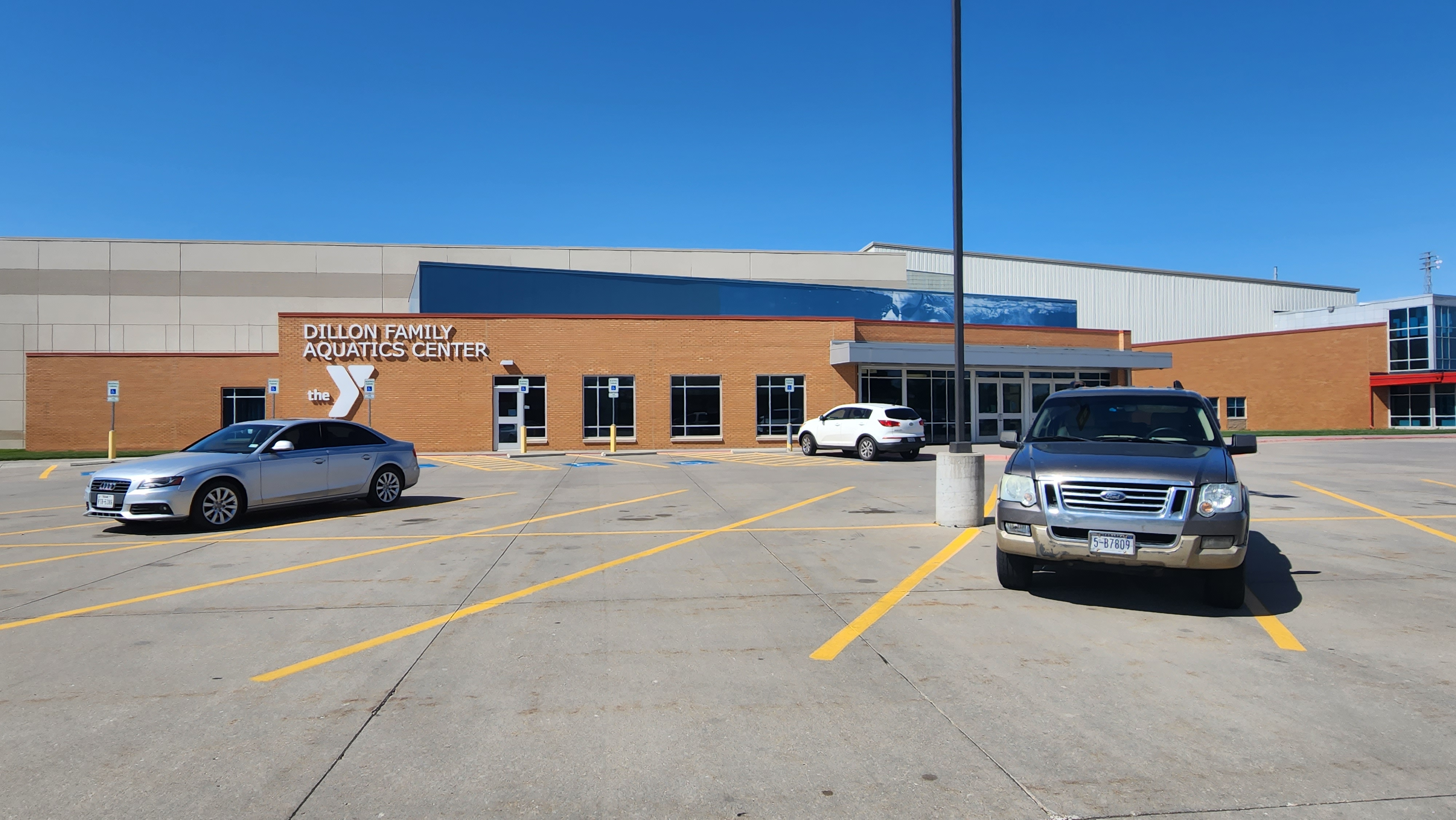
Front entrance of the Dillon Family Aquatic Center.

The Dillon Family Aquatic Center is an Aquatic Center located in the Fremont Family YMCA. It is the successor to the original instructional pool built in 1969, and the 25-meter (27 yd) lap pool built in 1994. Construction of the pool was completed in February 2018 and opened later that month.

The Dillon Family Aquatic Center is used by Fremont Senior High School and Midland University. The facility is also open to the public. The facility has a seating capacity of 450.

== Hazel R. Keene Wellness Center ==
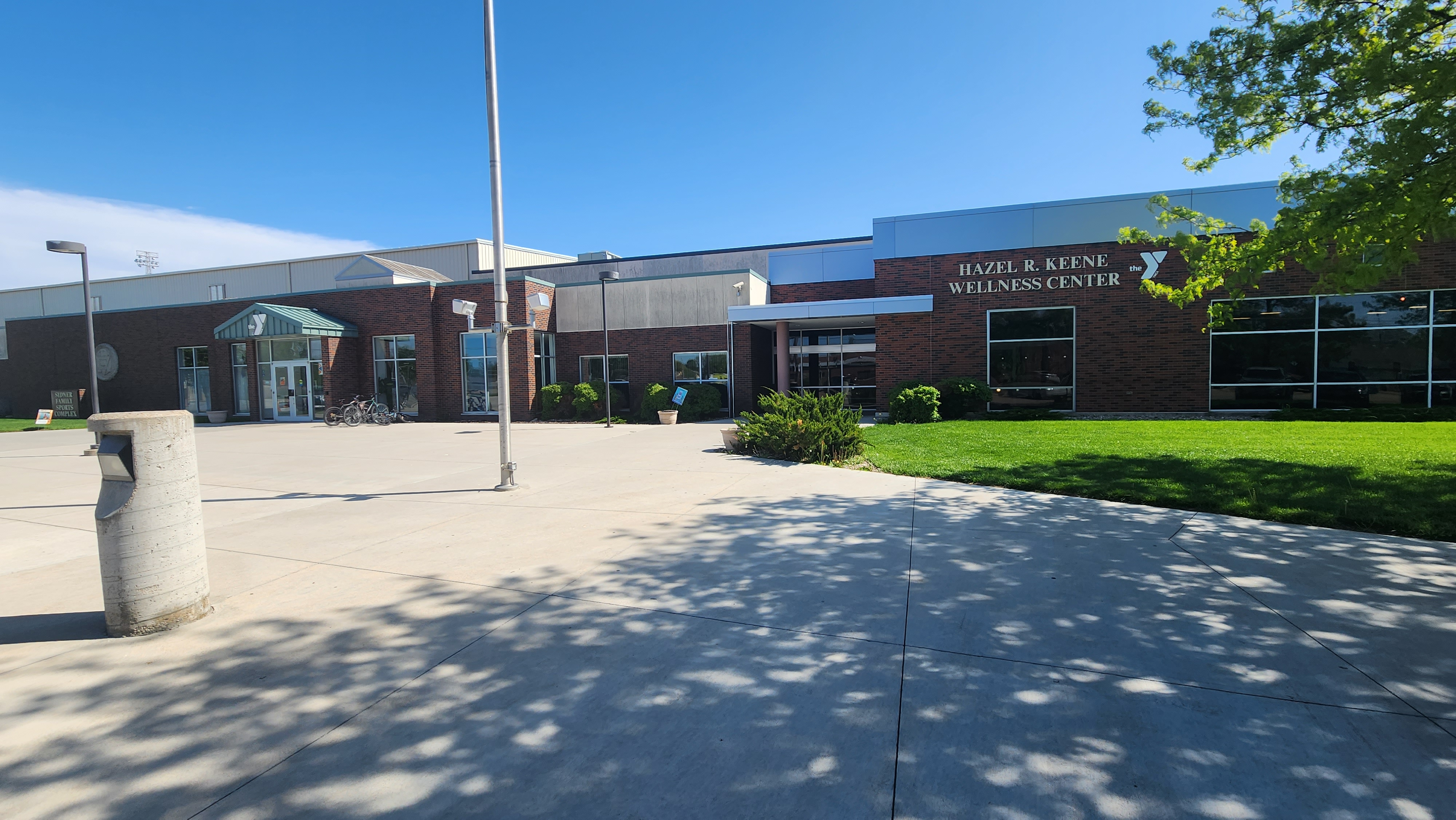
Front entrance to the Hazel R. Keene Wellness Center. To the left is the Sidner Family Sports Complex sign.

The Hazel R. Keene Wellness Center is a physical fitness center located at the Fremont Family YMCA. The center opened in 2006 and was named after Hazel R. Keene. When it opened, the addition measured 10,000 square feet (930 m^{2}) in size.

== Sidner Family Sports Complex ==
The Sidner Family Sports Complex is a sports complex located in the Fremont Family YMCA. The complex was opened in January 1985 and was named after Arthur C. Sidner. The opening of the complex caused a reported dramatic increase in membership.
