= Cumberland YMCA =

Historic building in Maryland, USA

- U.S. National Register of Historic Places
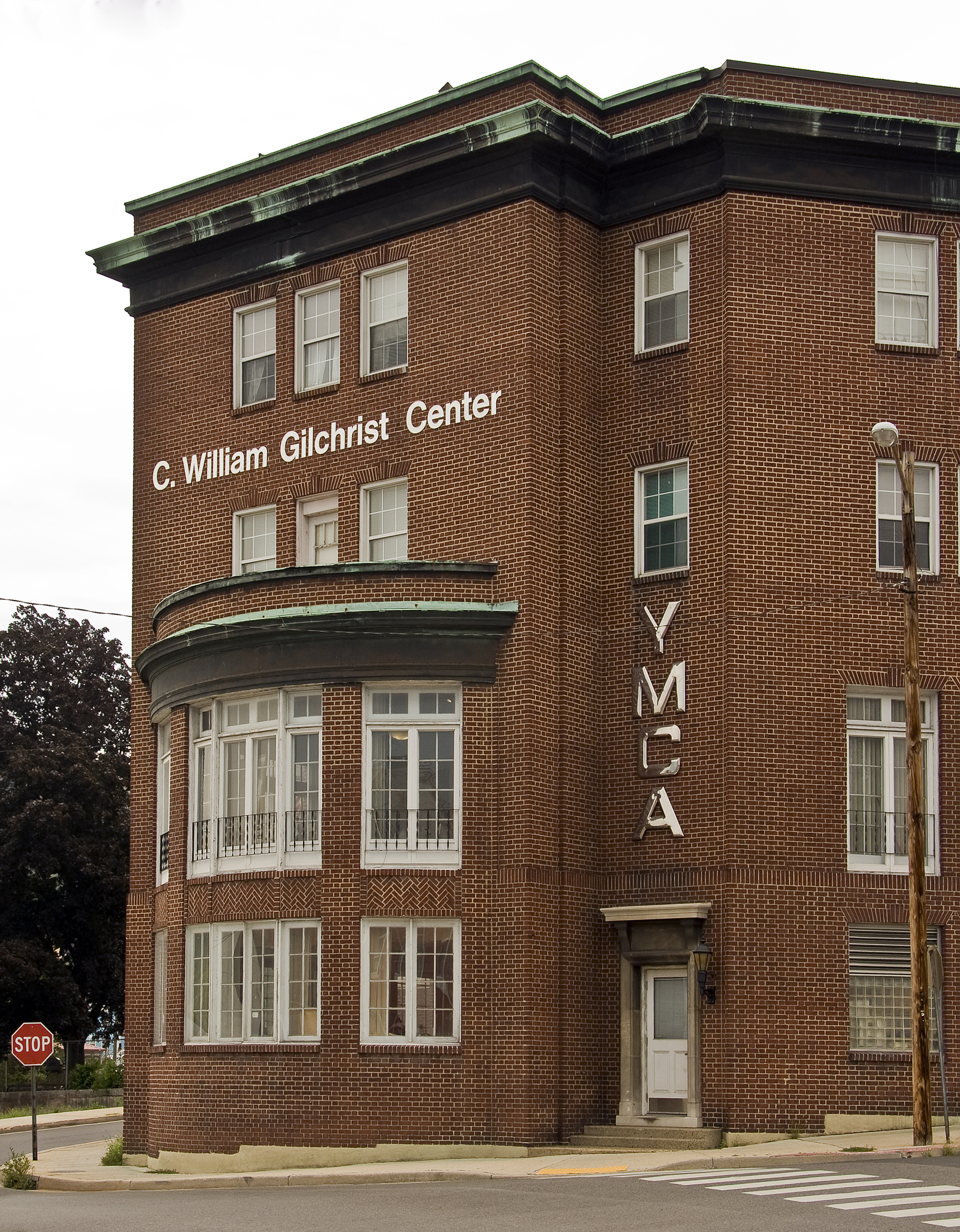

- Location within Maryland Location within the United States
- Location: 205 Baltimore Ave., Cumberland, Maryland
- Coordinates: 39°39′10″N 78°45′31″W
- Area: less than one acre
- Built: 1925
- Built by: Northeastern Construction Co.
- Architect: Shattuck, W. F.
- Architectural style: Classical Revival
- NRHP reference No.: 97001184
- Added to NRHP: September 26, 1997

The Cumberland YMCA building is a three-story wedge-shaped brick structure with a partially raised basement, built in 1925 in the Classical Revival style, located in Cumberland, Maryland, United States. It is an excellent example of institutional architecture of its time. At the time of its construction, it offered the only indoor swimming pool in the area.

The building was listed on the National Register of Historic Places in 1997.

== See also ==
- Downtown Cumberland Historic District
