= YMCA (Evansville, Indiana) =

- U.S. National Register of Historic Places
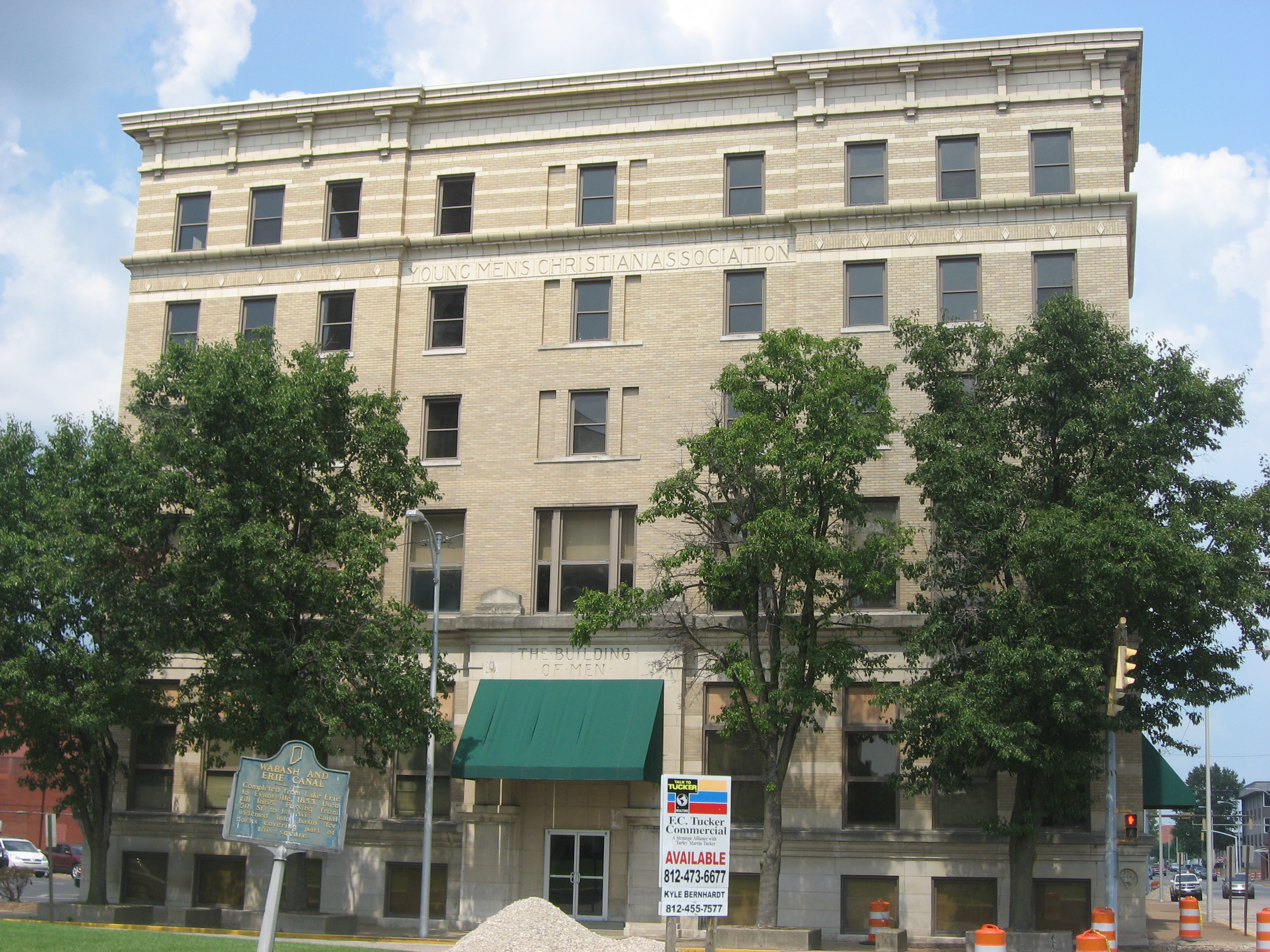
- Evansville YMCA, July 2011

- Location within Indiana Location within the United States
- Location: 203 N. W. Fifth St., Evansville, Indiana
- Coordinates: 37°58′20″N 87°34′31″W
- Area: less than one acre
- Built: 1924
- Architect: Thompson, W. F.; Geary, B. G.
- Architectural style: Tudor Revival
- MPS: Downtown Evansville MRA
- NRHP reference No.: 82000128
- Added to NRHP: July 1, 1982

YMCA is a historic YMCA located in downtown Evansville, Indiana. It was built in 1924, and is a five-story, Tudor Revival style yellow brick clubhouse on a raised basement. It features terra cotta detailing.

It was listed on the National Register of Historic Places in 1982.
