= Dubuque YMCA Building =

- U.S. National Register of Historic Places
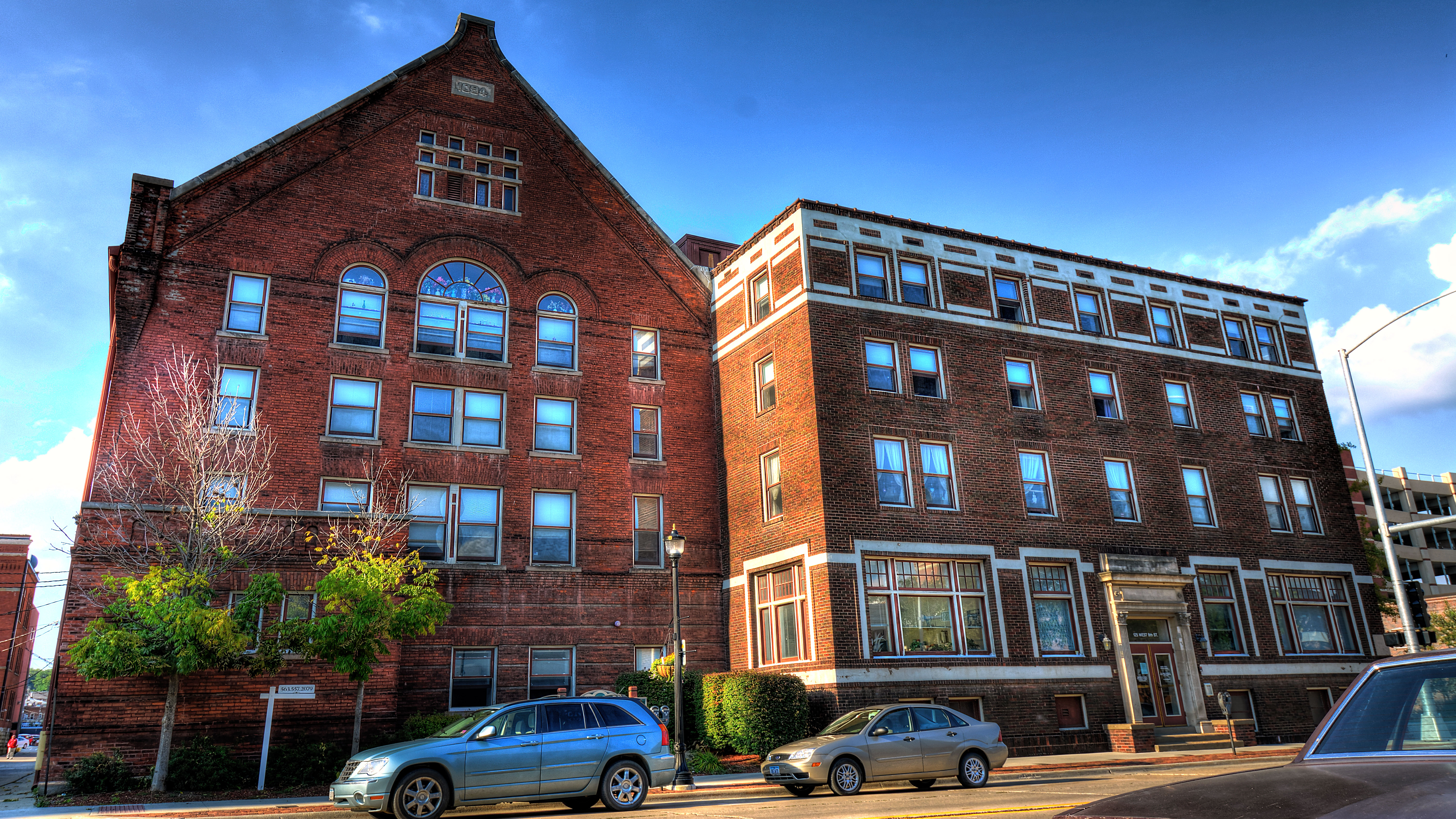

- Location within Iowa Location within the United States
- Location: 125 W. 9th St. Dubuque, Iowa
- Coordinates: 42°30′07.7″N 90°40′00.8″W
- Area: Less than one acre
- Built: 1894, 1916
- Built by: A.F. Zwack
- Architect: Cyrus D. McLane
- Architectural style: Romanesque Revival; Early Commercial
- NRHP reference No.: 01001541
- Added to NRHP: January 31, 2002

Dubuque YMCA Building, also known as the Iowa Inn, is a historic building located in Dubuque, Iowa, United States. Several area churches partnered to form the local YMCA in 1857. It was one of the first chapters formed west of the Mississippi River. Its activities ceased during the American Civil War, and it was reformed in 1866. They rented rooms on Main Street for their activities. Its first modest gymnasium was outfitted in 1884, and it was improved in 1992 when YMCA took over the facilities over the former Dubuque Athletic Club. The local YMCA completed the first section of this facility two years later, with the second section completed in 1916.

Often the local YMCA chapters copied or adapted one another's building designs, which gave their facilities an institutional character in form and style. The Romanesque Revival style was popular in Iowa in the 19th century, which is reflected in the 1894 section. In the early 20th century they generally employed the Neoclassical and Commercial styles, and the 1916 wing reflects the Commercial style.

YMCA remained here until 1969, when they opened a new joint facility with the YWCA on Dodge Street. This building became the Iowa Inn, which rented rooms to low-income people.

MetroPlains Development of St. Paul, Minnesota bought the building in 2000 and renovated it into an apartment building for senior citizens known as the Henry Stout Apartments. It was named for an early supporter of YMCA in Dubuque.

The building was listed on the National Register of Historic Places in 2002.
