= Spruce Street YMCA =

Historic building in North Carolina

- U.S. National Register of Historic Places
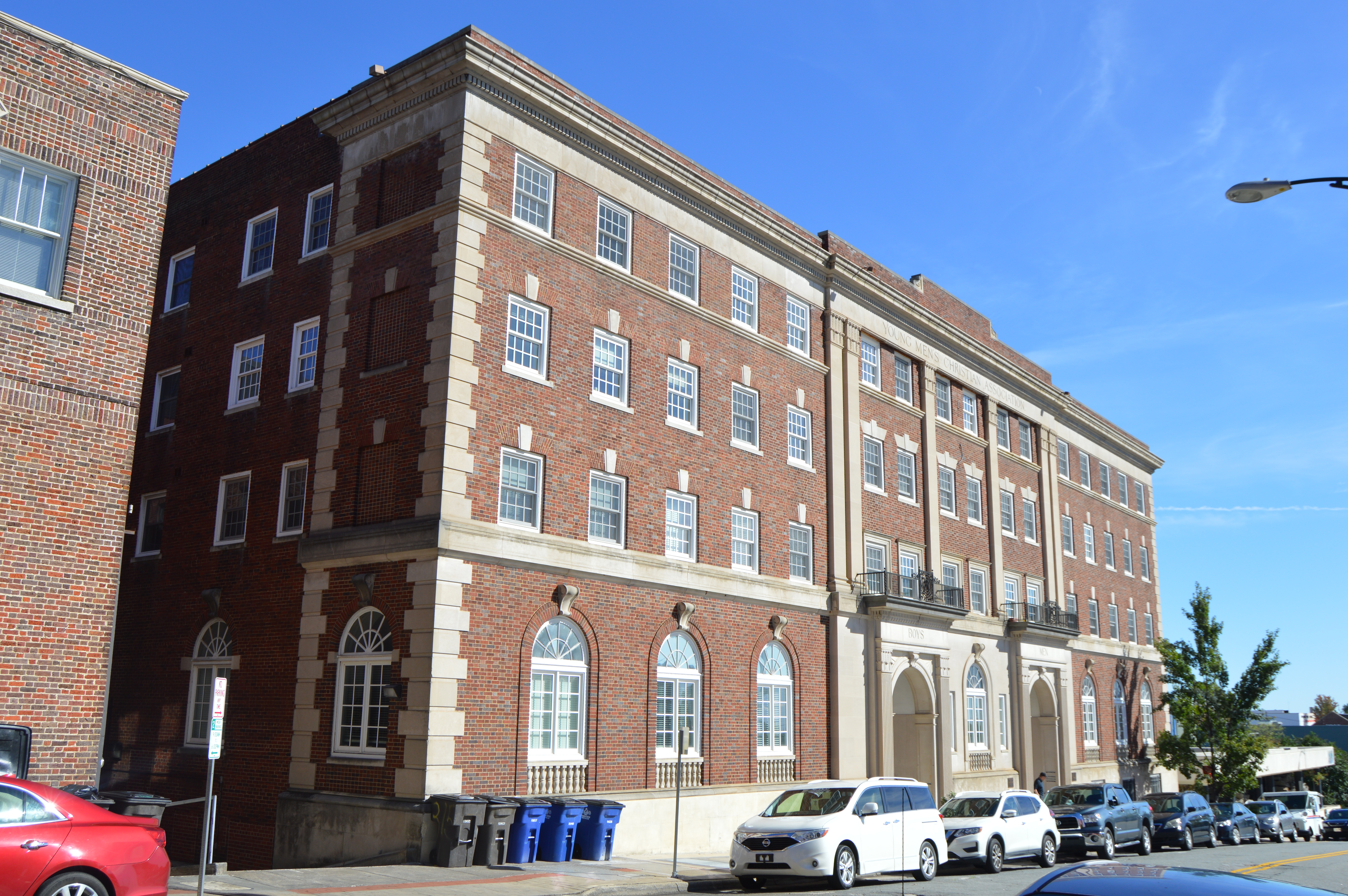
- Facade

- Location within North Carolina Location within the United States
- Location: 315 N. Spruce St., Winston-Salem, North Carolina
- Coordinates: 36°5′50″N 80°14′55″W
- Area: less than one acre
- Built: 1927
- Architect: Macklin, Harold
- Architectural style: Classical Revival
- NRHP reference No.: 84002296
- Added to NRHP: July 12, 1984

Spruce Street YMCA is a historic YMCA building located at Winston-Salem, Forsyth County, North Carolina. It was built in 1927, and is a four-story, brick and limestone building in the Classical Revival-style. The front facade features pilasters with Corinthian order capitals and two entrances with arched openings. The building house a YMCA until 1976.

It was listed on the National Register of Historic Places in 1984.
