= YMCA–Democrat Building =

- U.S. National Register of Historic Places
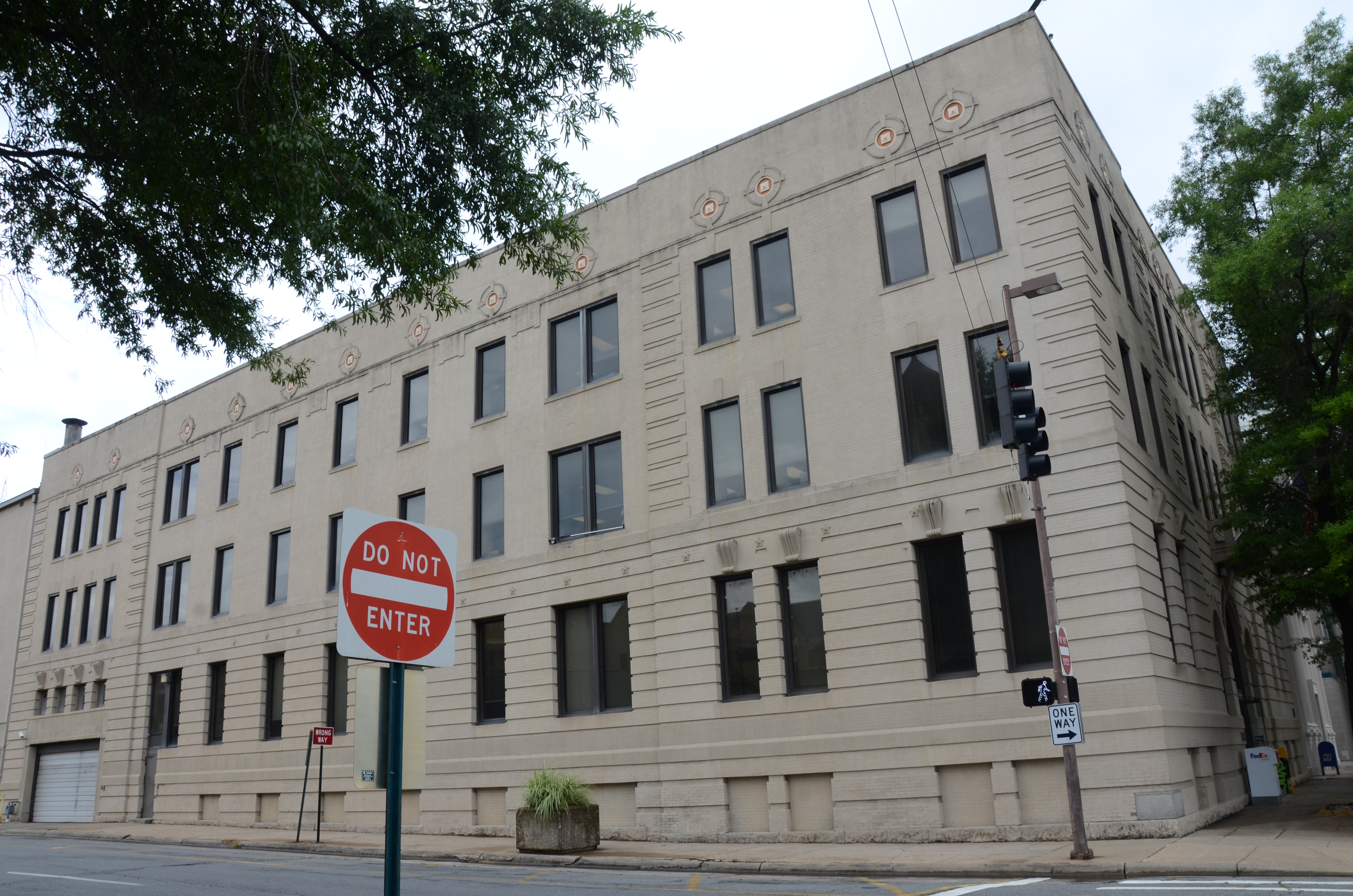

- Location within Arkansas Location within the United States
- Location: E. Capitol & Scott Sts., Little Rock, Arkansas
- Coordinates: 34°44′37″N 92°16′12″W
- Area: less than one acre
- Built: 1904
- Architect: Sanders & Gibb
- Architectural style: Renaissance
- MPS: Thompson, Charles L., Design Collection TR
- NRHP reference No.: 87001544
- Added to NRHP: June 11, 1992

The YMCA–Democrat Building is a historic commercial building at East Capitol and Scott Streets in downtown Little Rock, Arkansas. It is a three-story masonry structure, built out of brick with molded stone trim. Built in 1904, its restrained Renaissance Revival designs have been obscured to some extent by later alterations. It was designed by Sanders & Gibb, a prominent local architectural firm, and originally housed the local YMCA before later becoming home to the Arkansas Democrat-Gazette, one of the state's leading newspapers.

The building was listed on the National Register of Historic Places in 1992.

== See also ==
- Little Rock Y.M.C.A., the 1928 YMCA building
- List of YMCA buildings and structures
- National Register of Historic Places listings in Little Rock, Arkansas
