= Shane Homes YMCA at Rocky Ridge =

Building in Alberta, Canada

- Interactive map of the Shane Homes YMCA at Rocky Ridge area

General information
- Status: Completed
- Location: 1300 Rocky Ridge Rd NW; Calgary, Alberta, Canada
- Coordinates: 51°9′26″N 114°13′51″W
- Opening: January 15th, 2018
- Owner: City of Calgary

Technical details
- Floor area: 284,000 sq ft (26,400 m^{2})

Design and construction
- Architect: GEC Architects
- Engineer: RJC Engineering; ISL Engineering

Website
- www.ymcacalgary.org/program-descriptions/locations/shane-homes-ymca-at-rocky-ridge/

Shane Homes YMCA at Rocky Ridge, designed by GEC Architecture for the city of Calgary, Alberta, Canada is a large recreational facility located at Rocky Ridge, Calgary. The main sponsor of the project, Shane Homes, is a large homebuilder company rooted in Calgary. The investment for this recreational center totaled $192 million. The design objective was to introduce a multipurpose health facility to bring both the rural and urban populations in Calgary together through a space that promotes healthy living and community. Shane Homes YMCA opened to the public in 2018 as the construction was fully completed in 2017. This particular YMCA is known as the World's second largest YMCA in terms of square footage (284,000 sq ft [26,400 m^{2}]) and contains North America's largest glue-laminated timber roof. This communal facility is home to a multitude of active spaces that provide all ages and abilities with an area that promotes healthy living.

== Site ==
The site address of Rocky Ridge Recreational facility (RRRF) is 11300 Rocky Ridge Rd NW, Calgary, Alberta. The structure sits on a 2.6-hectare (6.4-acre) plot that settles in-between a wetland and a hill containing the highest elevation in the city of Calgary. The RRRF acts as a town center for the surrounding population of 100,000 residents. Surrounding the facility is a system of outdoor paths that connect to the nearby wetland and outdoor park/athletic spaces, allowing the active program to continue outdoors. Views from the site contain the city of Calgary and the surrounding mountains.

== Design ==
=== Influence ===
The landscape of the region heavily influenced the design of the YMCA as one of its main features is a low, elongated curved roof. This concept of a curvilinear roof was inspired by the surrounding foothills. The exterior cladding of the building includes brass tiles, these tiles with time will weather, turning them into a warm brown to match the colours found within the Prairie. The focus on glazing provides transparency to the exterior, allowing excessive natural lighting to penetrate the interior spaces. This further identifies the idea of connecting users with the surrounding natural landscape. Throughout the design, timber can be seen integrated into the structure not only for its structural integrity but also for its sustainable and aesthetic characteristics.

=== Floor plan ===
The building contains two main entrances along with multiple secondary ones for there to be multiple access points. The interior of the RRRF is different from traditional facilities as the layout integrates the different activities such as the pool, gymnasium, and hockey arena, rather than separating each program. Additional programming includes a library/gallery, daycare, physio, 250-seat theater, art studios, youth center, food services, and meeting rooms. Once you pass through the central point, all of the programs are accessible. The running track floats above the ground floor to lift users above the other public programming while interacting with the space.

=== Environmental design ===
The Rocky Ridge YMCA was designed targeting LEED gold to protect the site. LEED is an important certification as it is the most used environmental design rating system globally. The use of glue-laminated construction helped to reduce the size of the carbon footprint. The reduction of carbon correlates to taking 725 cars off the road for one year. The use of timber itself reduces the amount of carbon that is released into the environment.

The facility contains multiple systems that work to reduce the carbon footprint. This includes reducing waste energy and greenhouse gas emissions by reusing waste heat for use in pools and reusing gray water from the whirlpools to flush the toilets. Secondly, a heat and power cogeneration system uses natural gas to produce thermal and electrical energy. This system helps to heat the swimming pools and domestic hot water which heavily reduces the amount of waste energy. The site is also designed strategically to push stormwater runoff into bioswales and oil grit separators to filter it before it enters the surrounding wetlands.

=== Accessibility ===
GEC Architect's integration of a universal change room marks RRRF coincides with Canada's developing cultural needs. These spaces support a diversity of abilities, family arrangements, and orientations for everyone to feel comfortable when using this space. This is among the earliest buildings in Alberta and Canada to achieve this. Further accessible features to ensure everyone can use the RRRF include Assistive Listening Devices, accessible ramps, and signage in braille and English. In addition, the pool includes an accessible lift along with accessible equipment in the strength and conditioning sector.

== Engineering ==
The two main engineering firms that worked on the project to ensure it was structurally sound include RJC Engineering and ISL Engineering. Grasshopper and Rhinoceros 3D were used to model the structure prior to construction. Components that make up the structure of the building include framed glue-laminated beams on steel columns with cross-bracing, exposed structural concrete flooring, and a Canam metal deck roofing system.

=== Glue-laminated construction ===
RRRF's construction includes the largest North American glue-laminated timber (glulam) roof. The large and complex structure contains 2,750 m^{3} (97,000 cu ft) of glulams. Steel connectors are used to support these long-span timber beams to improve their stability. To overcome issues regarding the availability and structural integrity of the proper roof glulam beams, the firm ISL Engineering was introduced to the project and devised large splice connections. This ensured the beams would be long enough to span the building and were still structurally sound. These splice connections were sized between 2-4m in length, this size lead to lower costs and more manageable components.

== Awards ==
- 2020 Award for Accessibility from the 2020 Calgary Awards2013 Mayor's Urban Design Award from the City of Calgary
- 2019 Excellence in Concrete given by the American Concrete Institute
- 2018 Prairie Design Award of Excellence
- 2018 North American Copper in Architecture
