= Knoxville YMCA Building =

- U.S. National Register of Historic Places
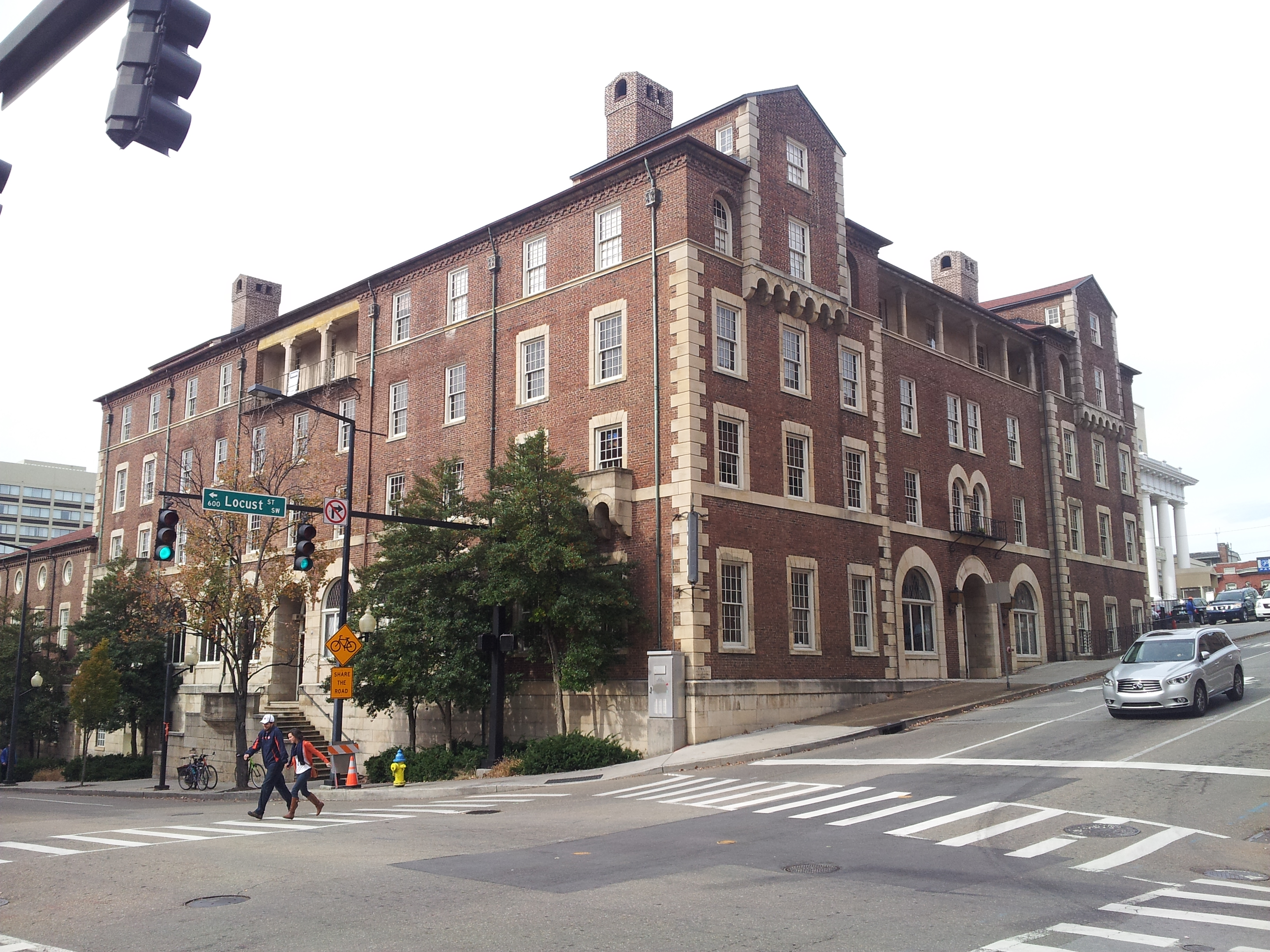
- The building in 2013

- Location within Tennessee Location within the United States
- Location: 605 Clinch Ave. Knoxville, Tennessee, USA
- Coordinates: 35°57′47″N 83°55′16″W
- Built: 1929
- Architect: BarberMcMurry
- NRHP reference No.: 83004256
- Added to NRHP: November 17, 1983

The Knoxville Downtown YMCA, also known as the Lindsay Young Downtown YMCA, is a building in Knoxville, Tennessee, that is listed on the U.S. National Register of Historic Places. It was designed by the Barber & McMurry architecture firm. Completed in 1929, it is the third oldest YMCA facility in the United States.

== History ==
The Knoxville YMCA was organized by the Second Presbyterian Church in 1854, disbanded during the Civil War, and reinstated in 1890. The property was originally owned by the McGhee family and was deeded to the YMCA on June 28, 1928. The Knoxville Downtown YMCA was built in 1929.

The building was later renamed in honor of Lindsay Young, local attorney and philanthropist who was a major donor to the Knoxville YMCA.

On April 25, 2008, a comprehensive renovation was completed to the property at a cost of approximately $2.5 million, including the conversion and sale of former hotel rooms into condominium residences. The proceeds of the sale of the condominiums and private donations were used to fund the renovations.

== Design ==
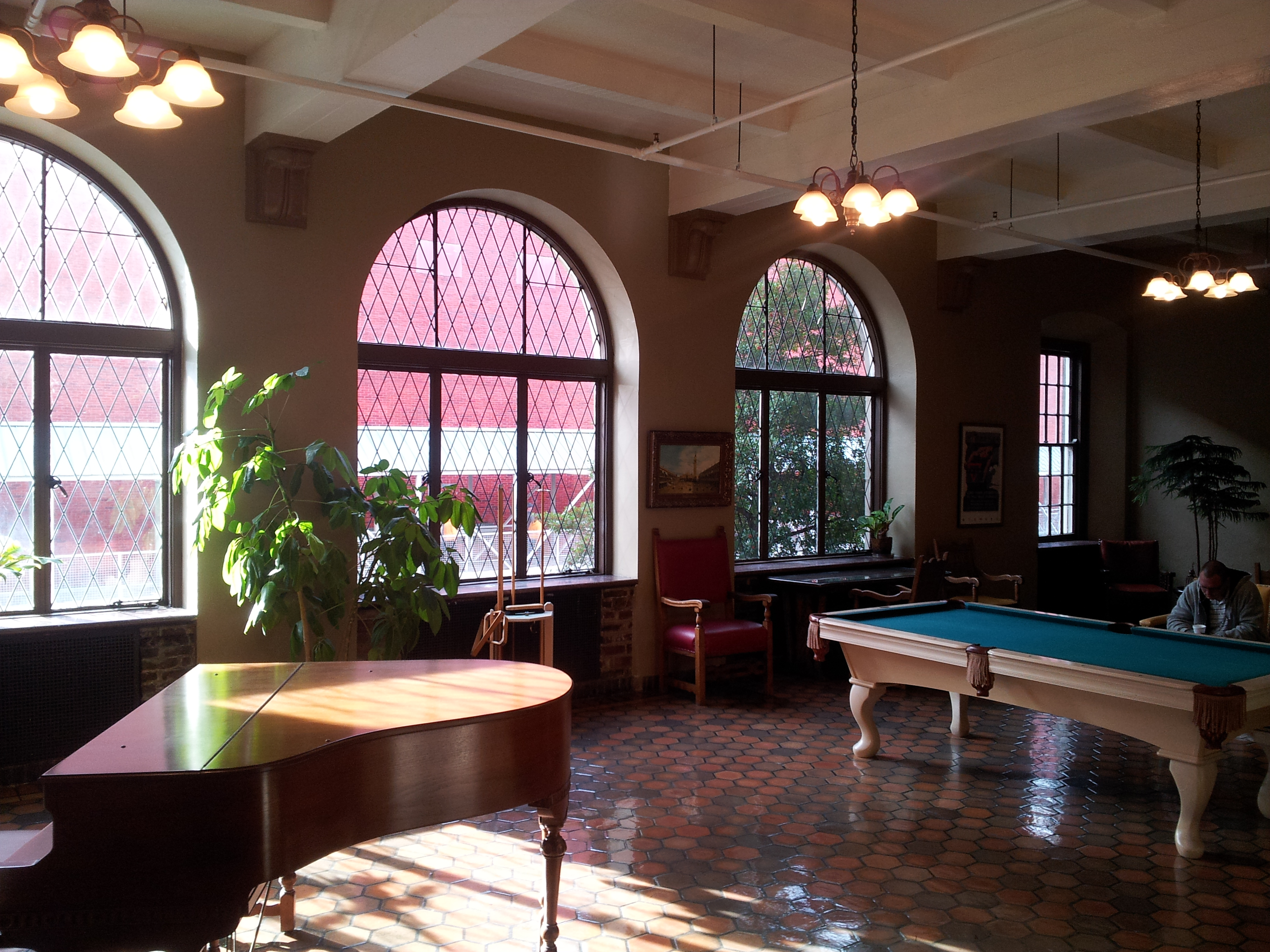
Knoxville Downtown YMCA Main Lobby

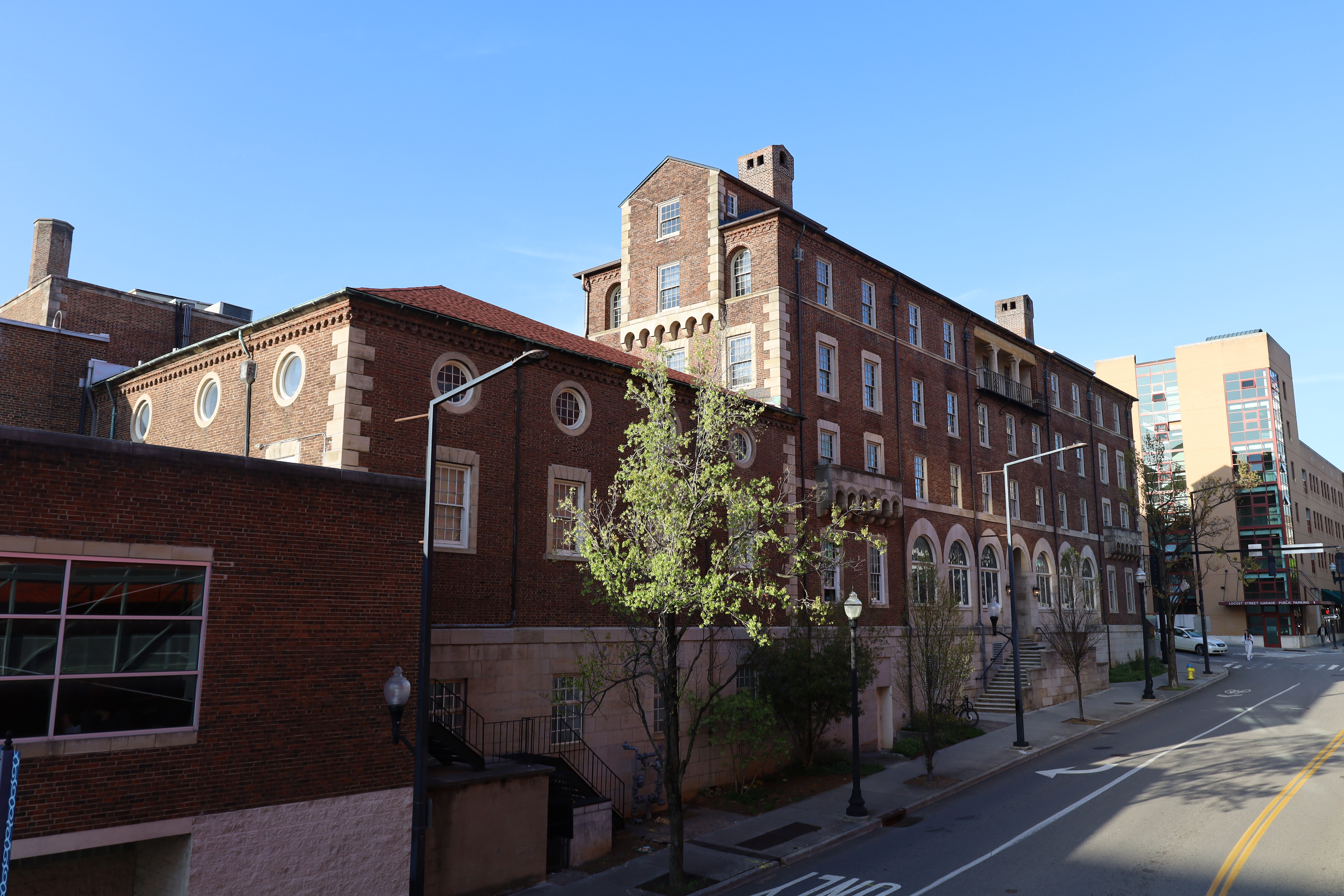
Side of the building in 2025

The interior of the building furnishings and layout are consistent with Spanish Colonial Revival design, featuring arched porticoes, tile flooring, diamond muntined windows, and plaster-covered walls. Knox Heritage describes the building as a combination of architectural revival styles, a strength of its designer Charles I. Barber, but classifies the building as a whole as Mediterranean Revival, with more significant design features of "brick laid in Flemish bond, the water table, corbelled string course, and interior courtyard and fourth-story loggias."

The YMCA facility is equipped with an indoor running track, lap pool, basketball court, racketball and handball courts, locker rooms for men and women, saunas and steam rooms, exercise studios, and a variety of exercise equipment.
