= Zanesville YMCA =

- U.S. National Register of Historic Places
- Location within Ohio
- Location: 34 S. Fifth St., Zanesville, Ohio
- Coordinates: 39°56′20″N 82°00′24″W
- Area: less than one acre
- Built: 1919
- Built by: Lorenz Construction Co.
- Architect: McLane, Cyrus
- NRHP reference No.: 83002018
- Added to NRHP: October 29, 1985

The Zanesville YMCA, at 34 S. Fifth St. in Zanesville, Ohio, was built in 1919. It was listed on the National Register of Historic Places in 1985.

It was designed by architect Cyrus McLane and built by the Lorenz Construction Co. McLane was architect of the Rock Island YMCA, in Rock Island, Illinois, and of other YMCA buildings.

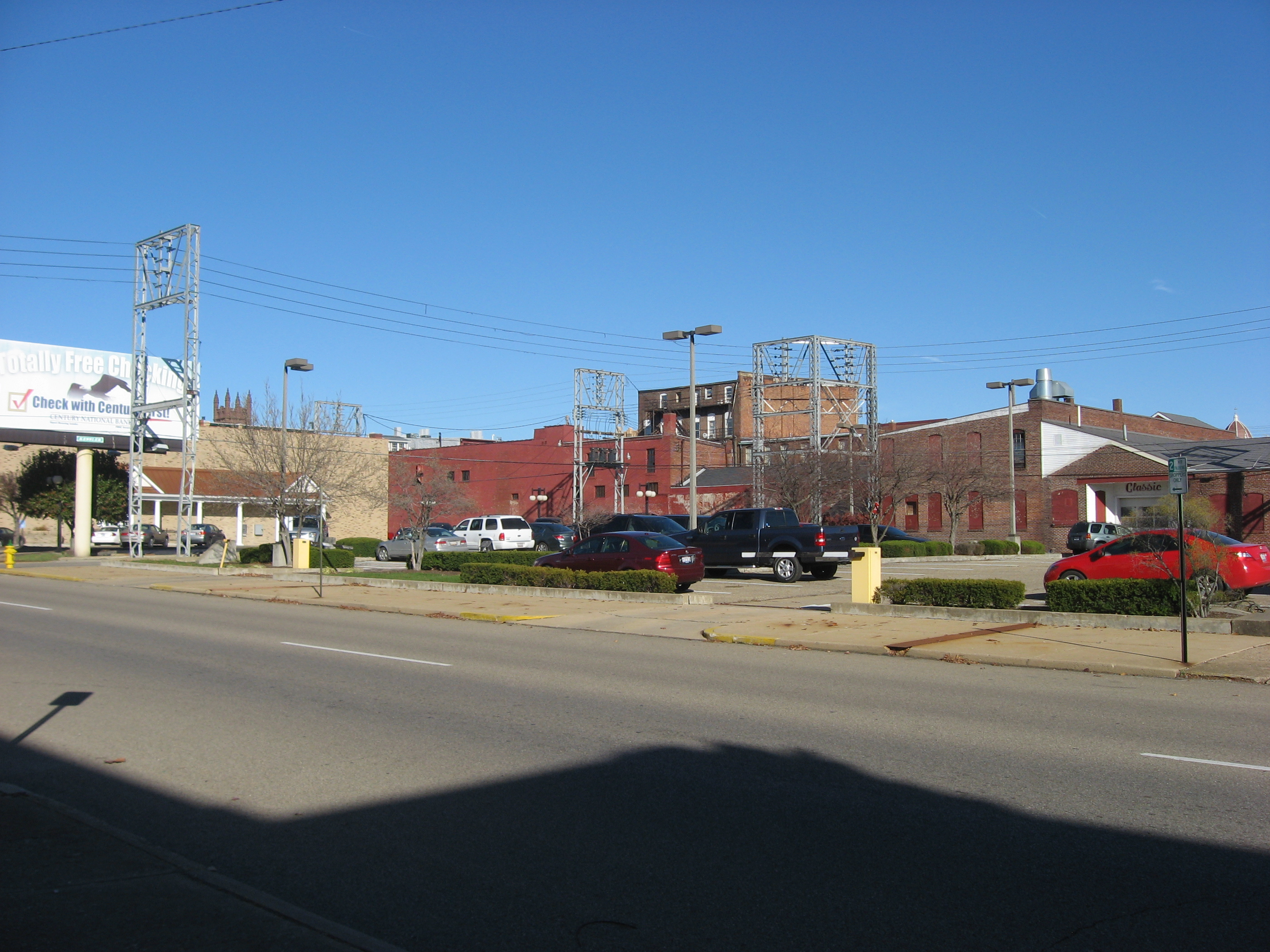
Site of former building

The building has been destroyed.

== See also ==
- Zanesville YWCA, also NRHP-listed
