= LGBTQ history in Rhode Island =

The state of Rhode Island, in the Northeast United States, has recorded LGBT history and individuals reaching back to the early 20th century. Prior to the 20th century, the state was also home to the Public Universal Friend and Charley Parkhurst, both well-known individuals with ambiguous gender identities. In 1995, the state became the ninth in the country to ban discrimination based on sexual orientation. In 2013, it became the tenth state to allow same-sex marriage.

== History of legality of same-sex sexual activity ==
In 1647, the first General Assembly of “The Incorporation of Providence Plantations in Narragansett Bay in New England" met in Portsmouth to codify the first set of laws governing the incorporation. The 1647 code is considered unusual for the time in America, for finding justification with the new testament instead of the old testament. The statute "Touching Whormongers" provided the death penalty for a number of offenses including sodomy, bestiality, fornication, and rape. The law was reworded in 1663 and 1729, removing references to the New Testament, but the death penalty remained. No prosecutions are known to have occurred.

In 1798, the state again reworded the law, lightening the penalty for a first offense, reading that any person convicted of sodomy shall "be carried to the gallows in a cart, and set upon the said gallows, for a space of time not exceeding four hours, and thence to the common gaol, there to be confined for a term not exceeding three years, and shall be grievously fined at the discretion of the Court". A second offense would result in death. The death penalty was removed as a penalty in 1844; punishment was set at 1 to 12 years' imprisonment. This was raised to 7 to 20 years' imprisonment in 1881.

The first recorded sodomy case in state courts occurred in 1962; in State v. Milne, the Rhode Island Supreme Court held that fellatio (oral sex) constituted an "abominable and detestable crime against nature". In 1973, the Commission on Jurisprudence of the Future recommended amending state law to remove the sodomy provisions, but this was rejected by the Rhode Island General Assembly. In State v. Levitt in 1977, the state Supreme Court rejected arguments that the sodomy law was unconstitutionally vague, and in 1980 in State v. Santos rejected claims that the law was a breach of privacy rights. In State v. McParlin in 1980, the court held that cunnilingus was also a violation of the sodomy statute. The Supreme Court again upheld the law as constitutional in 1995 in State v. Lopes. At that time, the law applied to consensual and non-consensual acts, whether between heterosexual or homosexual partners, and whether conducted in private or public.

Same-sex sexual acts between consenting adults in private have been legal in Rhode Island since anti-sodomy statutes were repealed in 1998. State Representative Edith Ajello sponsored the repeal bill for the seventh time when the Rhode Island House of Representatives passed it in May 1998. After the Rhode Island Senate passed it on June 2, 1998, Governor Lincoln Almond signed it into law.

== 18th century ==
The Public Universal Friend, an American preacher who called themself genderless and did not use gendered pronouns, was born in Cumberland in 1752. They began their ministry in 1776.

== 19th century ==
Stagecoach drive Charley Parkhurst, who was assigned female at birth but presented as a man starting at the age of 12, lived in Providence from the mid 1820s until 1848, when he left for the Gold Rush in California. During his time in Providence, Parkhurst worked as a coachman for several Providence hotels.

== 20th century ==
=== 1900–1939 ===
Female impersonator Francis Renault began performing in Providence in 1914.

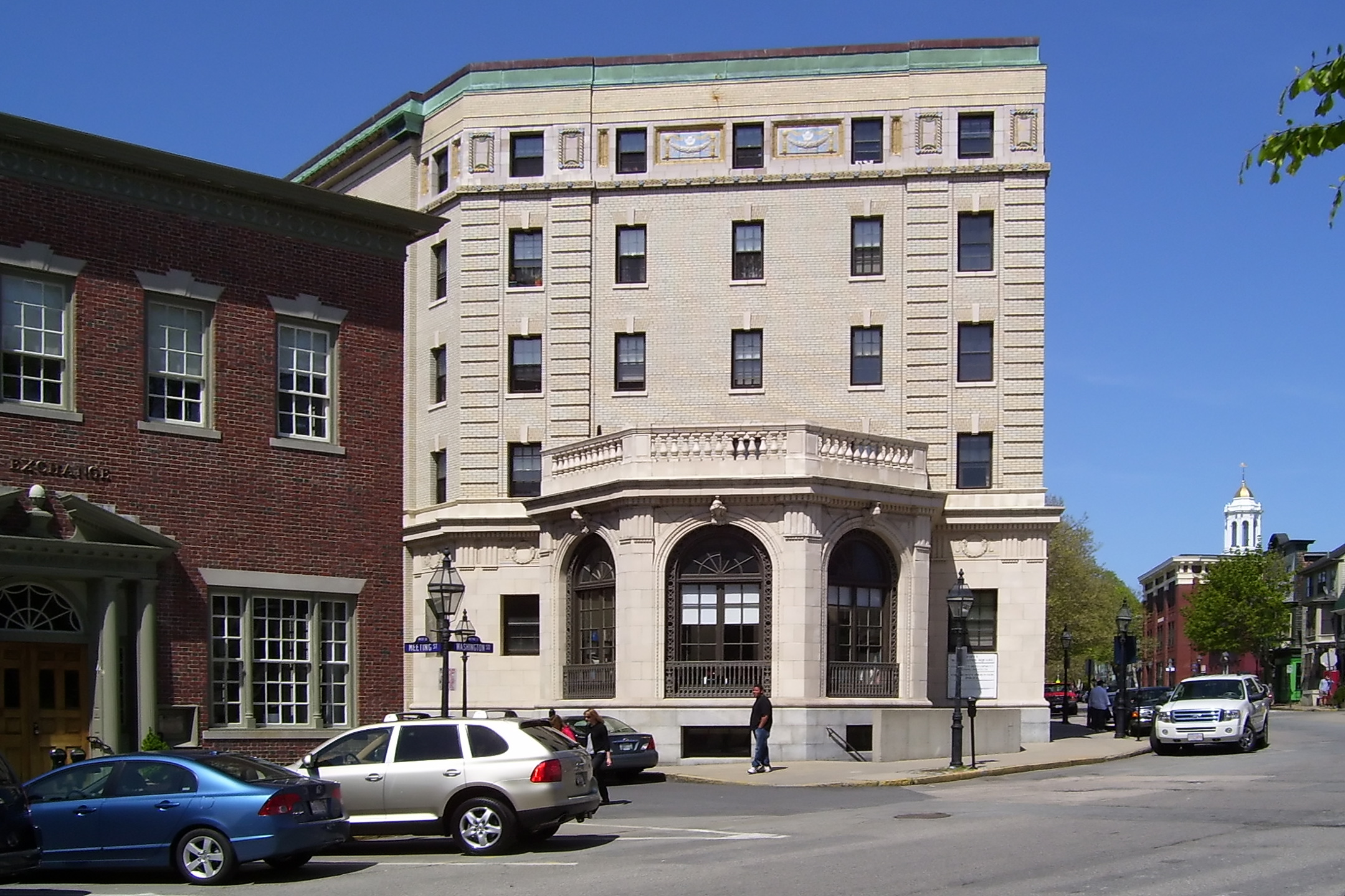
The Army and Navy YMCA (pictured) in Newport, Rhode Island was the focus of the investigation which led to the Newport sex scandal.

The Newport sex scandal arose from a 1919 investigation by the United States Navy into homosexual acts by Navy personnel and civilians in Newport, Rhode Island. The investigation was noted for its controversial methods of intelligence gathering, specifically its use of enlisted personnel to investigate alleged homosexual personnel by engaging them sexually. A subsequent trial attracted national news coverage and provoked a congressional investigation, which concluded with Secretary of the Navy Josephus Daniels and Assistant Secretary of the Navy (and future United States president) Franklin D. Roosevelt being formally rebuked by a Congressional committee.

=== 1940–1969 ===
In 1947, The Mirabar opened in Woonsocket; the bar would be the state's oldest gay bar as of 2018.

In the late 1960s through the early 1970s, lawyer and activist William Stringfellow lived with his partner, Anthony Towne, in Block Island. Although he did not write about his own sexuality, he spoke and wrote about homosexuality.

=== 1970–1979 ===
In 1972, Providence gained its first gay nightclub in the form of Club Gallery.

Rhode Island's local Metropolitan Community Church (MCC), founded in California by Troy Perry in 1968 as a ministry for gay and lesbian people, held its first service in 1973. The church was given "affiliated status" by the Rhode Island State Council of Churches the following year, a decision which led the Line Baptist Church in the town of Foster to leave the American Baptist Churches of Rhode Island (ABCORI). A 1974 study by an ABCORI panel chaired by Robert Drechsler, a Warwick pastor who was gay but closeted at the time, examined whether gay people can live their lives as Christians and ultimately concluded that "homosexuals are persons for whom Christ died".

In 1975, the Towards a Gayer Bicentennial Committee was founded by members of LGBT groups within the state, including the Metropolitan Community Church, Gay Community Services, Gay Women of Providence, and the Rhode Island College Gay Alliance. The group advocated for inclusion of LGBT people and their concerns in the planning of the state's 1976 Bicentennial celebrations, which the Rhode Island Bicentennial Commission denied. Regardless of this, and the Providence police chief's vehement opposition, the group went ahead with hosting Providence's first Pride march in July 1976, at the Old State House, with the blessing of a state judge.

In 1978, Providence proposed passing an anti-discrimination ordinance, although it did not include discrimination due to sexual orientation. The pastor of Providence's MCC chapter, Reverend Marge Ragona, held an eight-day hunger strike at the federal courthouse in Providence, to convince legislators to add a provision to protect the LGBT community. The ordinance passed without the LGBT amendment.

=== 1980–1989 ===
In early 1980, a senior student at Cumberland High School, Aaron Fricke, asked to bring a male date to the school's prom. His request was denied by the school's principal, on the ground's that Fricke's request would be disruptive to the event, and might place Fricke and his date in danger; a similar request was denied on similar grounds in 1979. Fricke went on to sue the school district, claiming that the denial of his request was an infringement of his right to free speech, as his request involved "conduct...with considerable expressive meaning. In Fricke v. Lynch, the federal district court ruled in Fricke's favor, saying that attending the prom with a male date constituted protected speech, as the action was expressing a political message about gay people's rights in society.

A magazine serving Rhode Island's gay community, Options, was founded in 1982.

In 1983, the Rhode Island Alliance for Lesbian and Gay Civil Rights was founded, and it began hosting blood drives for people with HIV. The same year, the CBC, a bath house on Weybosset Street in Providence, began offering HIV testing and AIDS risk reduction education. The locale was a popular gathering place for gay men in the city.

In 1984, Rep. Linda Kushner introduced legislation in the state's House of Representatives which would prohibit discrimination against LGBT individuals. The bill failed, but similar legislation would be introduced every year after this.

In August 1985, Governor Edward D. DiPrete issued an executive order banning discrimination against gay and lesbian employees of the state government. The next month, the Providence City Council rejected a proposal protecting gay and lesbian people from employment and housing discrimination due to backlash from Bishop Louis Edward Gelineau and other city figures.

=== 1990–1999 ===
In 1995, an anti-discrimination bill protecting the LGBT community passed in the General Assembly, and was signed into law by Governor Lincoln C. Almond. With this, Rhode Island became the ninth state to ban discrimination based on sexual orientation.

Rhode Island's first openly gay state representative, Mike Pisaturo, was elected in 1996. In 1997, he introduced the first bill that attempted to legalize same-sex marriage in the state. Although the bill was defeated, he symbolically resubmitted it each year for the rest of his term. That same year, Providence appointed the city's first liaison to the gay community. In 1998, Pisaturo introduced the bill that successfully repealed the state's sodomy laws, as well as a successful bill to grant hospital visitation rights to same-sex couples; in 1999, he introduced a successful bill allowing residents of the state to designate any person, family member or not, as the planner of their funeral.

== 21st century ==
=== 2000–2009 ===
The last LGBT bar in Woonsocket, Kings and Queens, closed in 2002. Later that year, in November, David Cicilline was elected mayor of Providence; from 2002 until 2006, Providence was the largest city in the US to have a gay mayor.

In 2004, the Rhode Island Foundation published the "Meet the Neighbors" report, documenting the lives of the state's lesbian, gay, bisexual, transgender, transsexual, two-spirited, queer, and questioning residents. The Providence Journal wrote that it made Rhode Island the first state to "offer an informed look at those communities".

In September 2006, Massachusetts, which recognized same-sex marriage, ruled that they would grant marriage licenses to gay Rhode Islanders seeking to marry someone of the same sex. In February 2007, the Rhode Island Attorney General determined that same-sex marriages performed in Massachusetts were valid in Rhode Island. In December 2007, a case found that same-sex couples who married in Massachusetts were unable to divorce in Rhode Island. Following New Hampshire's recognition of same-sex civil unions in 2008, Rhode Island became the only New England state "with no recognition of same-sex relationships in the law".

=== 2010–2019 ===
Students of the University of Rhode Island participated in an eight-day library sit-in in protest of alleged bias against LGBT students in 2010. In July 2011, Rhode Island's governor signed a bill recognizing civil unions, and, in 2013, Rhode Island became the tenth state nationwide and the final state in New England to recognize same-sex marriage. Burrillville couple Aaron Couto and Ray Daignault became the state's first civil union in July 2011. Nearly two years later, a total of 85 civil unions were recognized in the state.

In 2015, Brown University announced a $100 million plan intended to increase diversity at its campus through 2025, including a goal to double the amount of faculty who are members of underrepresented groups, such as minorities, women, and LGBT people.

In March 2016, Cumberland became the first public school district in the state with a formal policy protecting transgender students. In June, the Rhode Island Department of Education published guidance on transgender students, which advocated for allowing students to use the bathroom affiliated with their identities.

In 2017, Rhode Island became the tenth state to ban conversion therapy for minors.

In June 2019, Providence Bishop Thomas Tobin received significant backlash, including from Rhode Island Pride and Providence mayor Jorge Elorza, after tweeting that Catholics should not attend Pride events. Rhode Island Pride organized a rally at Cathedral Square in Providence in response.

In November 2019, Governor Gina Raimondo signed a bill into law whereby LGBT veterans who received a dishonorable discharge under Don't Ask, Don't Tell can have that discharge changed, and ensures that those veterans have access to veteran benefits.

=== 2020–present ===
In January 2020, presidential candidate Pete Buttigieg's husband, Chasten Buttigieg, cancelled an appearance at an LGBT nightclub in Providence due to the club's "dancing pole", which sparked backlash from LGBT voters, who felt Buttigieg's campaign was trying to pander to straight voters. The state's first LGBTQ health center, Open Door Health, opened in Providence in March 2020.

In 2021, the Providence Public Library launched the RI LGBTQ+ Community Archive, the first LGBT public community archives in the state.

A bill targeting transgender people in sports that would "categorize women by their biological identity at birth rather than their gender identity for purposes of organized sports" was introduced by Republican state representative Elaine J. Morgan in 2022. It was subsequently criticized by the recently formed Rhode Island Queer Political Action Committee.

In January 2023, Donnie Anderson was elected as the chair of the Rhode Island Democratic Women's Caucus, becoming the first trans woman to hold the role.

In March 2023, state representative Robert Quattrocchi, from Scituate, was removed from a Rhode Island State House committee after asking Rebecca Kislak, a lesbian representative from Providence, if she was a pedophile.

== See also ==
- LGBT rights in Rhode Island
