= Ahlquist =

Ahlquist is a surname. Notable people with the surname include:

- Dale Ahlquist (born 1958), American author
- Jessica Ahlquist (born 1995), American activist
- Jon Edward Ahlquist (1944–2020), American molecular biologist and ornithologist
- Lloyd Ahlquist (born 1977), American comedian/musician
- Raymond P. Ahlquist (1914–1983), American pharmacist and pharmacologist
- Steve Ahlquist, American journalist

== See also ==
- Ahlquist v. Cranston
- Ahlqvist
