= The Real Housewives of Rhode Island season 1 =

Season of American reality television series

The Real Housewives of Rhode Island
- Season 1
- Promotional poster
- Starring: Alicia Carmody; Rosie DiMare; Ashley Iaconetti; Liz McGraw; Rulla Nehme Pontarelli; Kelsey Swanson; Jo-Ellen Tiberi
- No. of episodes: 14

Release
- Original network: Bravo
- Original release: April 2 – June 28, 2026

The first season of the American reality television series The Real Housewives of Rhode Island, premiered on Bravo on April 2, 2026, and concluded on June 28 of the same year. The season is produced by Amazon MGM Studios' Evolution Media, featured 14 episodes, and was filmed in Rhode Island.

Alicia Carmody, Rosie DiMare, Ashley Iaconetti, Liz McGraw, Rulla Nehme Pontarelli, Kelsey Swanson, and Jo-Ellen Tiberi appeared as series regulars for the inaugural season. Following the conclusion of the season, McGraw announced her decision to exit the series.

== Production ==
On May 7, 2025, The Real Housewives of Rhode Island was announced as the twelfth installment of the network's Real Housewives franchise. On May 8, 2025, The Providence Journal reported the show's cast would consist of Carmody, DiMare, Iaconetti (of The Bachelor franchise), McGraw, Pontarelli, Swanson, and Tiberi. Filming began July, and commenced in September 2025. In November, at that years BravoCon convention, Cohen revealed the cast along with the seasons trailer.

The season premiered with "Welcome to Rhode Island" on April 2, 2026, and twelfth episode "The Ferry-Tale Is Over" served as the season finale, airing on June 14, 2026. which was followed by a two-part reunion that ran from June 21 to June 28. The season was produced by Evolution Media, along with executive producers Lucilla D'Agostino, Joseph Ferraro, Jen McClure-Metz and Andy Cohen. Filming for the season took place in Block Island, Cranston, Warwick, East Greenwich, and Providence.

== Local reception ==
Upon its announcement, the local reception for the production was positive, receiving praises from the Rhode Island Senate President Valarie Lawson and then-Rhode Island House of Representatives Speaker Joe Shekarchi, and Rhode Island Governor Dan McKee, who commented: We're excited to welcome 'The Real Housewives' and their millions of viewers to Rhode Island. Our state is home to vibrant communities, amazing food, rich history, and stunning coastal beauty – perfect for the spotlight. This is a great opportunity to support our local economy and bring national attention to all Rhode Island has to offer.

== Cast ==
BravoTV.com described the inaugural cast as "fresh, charismatic group of women whose lives intertwine across the storied coastline of New England luxury." At BravoCon, when the cast was announced, it was revealed that Dolores Catania of the New Jersey franchise would also be joining the show in a recurring "Friend of the Housewives" role.

Alicia Carmody is a Providence resident originally from Cranston who is a lifelong friend of cast member Liz McGraw. After graduating from Paul Mitchell Beauty School, she worked as a hair and makeup artist for 20 years. She also helps her fiancé, Bill Kitsilis, with their Cranston pizza shop, Pizza Mamma. Together, she and Bill share one daughter.

Rosie DiMare is a former television news anchor who worked for Rhode Island's WPRI-TV and WJAR television stations. A graduate of Boston University, DiMare also works as a DJ and a social media manager for local companies. She and her husband, professional Frank Sinatra impersonator Rich DiMare, reside in North Kingston with their dog.

Ashley Iaconetti is an influencer and podcaster originally from Virginia. Ashley moved to Rhode Island in 2021 to live with her husband Jared Haibon (a Warwick native), whom she met in 2015 when both participated in the second season of Bachelor in Paradise. The pair co-manage the Audrey's Coffee House & Lounge in South Kingstown, and reside in West Greenwich with their two sons.

Elizabeth "Liz" McGraw, alongside her husband Gerry McGraw, owns the Thomas C. Slater Compassion Center, which happens to be Rhode Island's largest cannabis dispensary and the state's first medical dispensary. She and her husband reside in their waterfront home in Cranston with their cat. McGraw met Dolores Catania at a cannabis convention, and plan to start a line of gummies for menopausal women.

Rulla Nehme Pontarelli is a financial planner and Wealth Manager of Lebanese descent. Since graduating from Clark University in 2001, she has worked for the Warwick-based company Independence Financial Partners. She and her husband, podiatrist Brian F. Pontarelli, reside in Lincoln with their two children.

Kelsey Swanson is a Rhode Island native and former pageant titleholder originally from Cranston. A graduate of the University of Rhode Island, Swanson gained state notoriety in 2017 when she was named Miss Rhode Island USA. She owns the Miss Makeup RI beauty company, which specializes in pageants and weddings. Kelsey resides in her boyfriend of ten years' home in East Greenwich.

Jo-Ellen Tiberi is an aesthetic practice development manager living in Cranston. Like Kelsey, Jo-Ellen graduated from the University of Rhode Island, where she earned her Bachelor of Arts. She later earned the title of Master Esthetician from Aveda Institute. Jo-Ellen is married to her high school sweetheart Gary Tiberi, a mortgage loan officer. Together they share three children.

== Episodes ==
The Real Housewives of Rhode Island season 1 episodes
No. overall	No. in season	Title	Rating (18–49)	Original release date	US viewers (millions)
1	1	"Welcome to Rhode Island"	0.08	April 2, 2026	0.47
2	2	"Ocean State of Affairs"	0.09	April 5, 2026	0.42
3	3	"Saturday Night Fever Dream"	0.08	April 12, 2026	0.42
4	4	"De-Railed Divas"	0.10	April 19, 2026	0.45
5	5	"Schooner or Later"	0.09	April 26, 2026	0.53
6	6	"Newport, New Problems"	0.11	May 3, 2026	0.44
7	7	"Boats, Lies & Videotape"	0.09	May 10, 2026	0.34
8	8	"Splitting Hairs"	0.08	May 17, 2026	0.39
9	9	"Questionable Behavior"	0.08	May 24, 2026	0.35
10	10	"Fools Rush In"	0.09	May 31, 2026	0.43
11	11	"Stay Clam & Carry On"	0.09	June 7, 2026	0.41
12	12	"The Ferry-Tale Is Over"	0.10	June 14, 2026	0.41
13	13	"Reunion Part 1"	0.07	June 21, 2026	0.34
14	14	"Reunion Part 2"	0.09	June 28, 2026	0.38

== Ratings ==
The series' premiere attracted 2.7 million viewers across various platforms within seven days of its debut on April 2, 2026, marking Bravo's largest multi-platform premiere since 2024, as reported by NBCUniversal. The episode also achieved the distinction of being the most-watched series or season premiere for a Bravo original on Peacock within its first seven days, as reported by the company.
