= Steve Ahlquist =

American journalist

Steve Ahlquist is an American journalist. He previously wrote for the online publications Uprise RI and Rhode Island's Future, founding the former in 2017, and wrote comic books. He now works independently, reporting on local issues via the Substack subscription platform.

Some local journalists and media outlets have described Ahlquist's work as advocacy journalism, while some have said that his reporting has filled a gap that has formed as a result of staff cuts by traditional media organizations in the state. The Boston Globe in 2023 wrote that he was often one who is "breaking news, covering events on the ground, and doing it all with a point of view that's plain for anyone to see, including when he occasionally testifies before public bodies."

== Career ==
A former comic writer, Ahlquist worked on the anthology Strange Eggs (SLG Publishing) and created the series Oz Squad. He formerly owned a retail comics and video store. He later wrote for the political blog Rhode Island's Future, during which Rhode Island Pride, an LGBT organization, gave Ahlquist its 2015 Spirit of Pride Award for his reporting.

Ahlquist went on to found the online publication Uprise RI, for news and opinion, in 2017. He worked as a reporter alongside Greg Brailsford. Jerry Elmer, an attorney with the Conservation Law Foundation, credits Ahlquist and his reporting on Uprise RI with supporting the movement against a natural gas power plant in Burrillville, Rhode Island, which was proposed by energy company Invenergy in 2015, at which point Ahlquist had been a reporter for 3 years. He began to attend hearings, meetings, and demonstrations connected to the power plant, motivated by what he perceived as a lack of coverage on the power plant, despite his inexperience with reporting on such issues. Among other stories, he reported on being denied press access to a related event in late 2017 and his testimony to the Rhode Island General Assembly against the proposal.

In 2018, the Rhode Island Public Transit Authority (RIPTA) was sent a critical letter by American Civil Liberties Union of Rhode Island after the RIPTA chief security officer told Ahlquist to stop recording at a public meeting, in conflict with freedom of information rights afforded by the state's Open Meetings Act (OMA). He filed an OMA complaint with the state attorney general relating to a 2019 meeting held by the Central Falls Detention Facility Corporation, operator of the privately-run Donald W. Wyatt Detention Facility, that was connected to the Immigration and Customs Enforcement detainees that the facility was later found to have held. At one of the George Floyd protests in 2020, Ahlquist told The Providence Journal that he had gone to almost all protests held in the state in the past seven years. The local news outlet GoLocalProv recognized Ahlquist in 2022 for his reporting on human rights issues, such as his criticism of the state's policies governing homelessness.

Ahlquist left Uprise RI in 2023 to begin publishing a newsletter through the Substack subscription platform. Upon Ahlquist's departure, Brailsford said that Uprise RI would continue investigative journalism but would shift its focus to a service for Rhode Islanders who are in "unfortunate situations and need assistance". In testimony to the state legislature for House Bill 7967 (2024), which expands protections afforded by the state's 2012 Homeless Bill of Rights, Ahlquist spoke about the reporting he had done on Providence police allegedly targeting homeless people.

== Personal life ==
Ahlquist grew up in Warwick, Rhode Island. His niece, Jessica Ahlquist, was plaintiff in the federal lawsuit Ahlquist v. Cranston, wherein Cranston High School West was directed to remove a prayer banner hung in the building as it violated the Establishment Clause of the United States Constitution.

Ahlquist was a founding member and president of The Humanists of Rhode Island. While president, in 2014, he held a protest in Warwick calling for a boycott of Hobby Lobby after the Supreme Court's ruling in Burwell v. Hobby Lobby Stores, Inc.; the decision allows private, for-profit corporations to take religious exemptions from a regulation that its owners object to.
