= Donnie Anderson =

American minister and social activist

Donnie Anderson (born 1947 or 1948) is an American Baptist minister and social activist based in Rhode Island. As executive minister of the Rhode Island State Council of Churches from 2007 to 2020, Anderson acted as a representative for various denominations and church organizations in the state and was the subject of media attention in 2018 when she came out as a transgender woman. She ran in the Democratic primary to represent Senate District 1 (Providence) in 2022, losing to incumbent Maryellen Goodwin. In 2023, she was elected chair of the Rhode Island Democratic Women's Caucus, a political organization separate from the state Democratic Party. The Providence Journal in 2018 described her as a social activist for "the poor, the homeless and the LGBTQ community in Rhode Island."

== Early life ==
Anderson was born to Carl and Ruth (Fassel) Anderson (d. 2003) in 1947 or 1948. Raised in Cranston, Rhode Island, she graduated from Cranston High School West in 1966, when the institution was a combined middle school and high school, and she went on to earn a bachelor's degree in business education from Barrington College, a master's degree in religious studies from Providence College, and a Doctor of Ministry from Eastern Baptist Theological Seminary.

Anderson was raised in the conservative evangelical Protestant faith, but felt her "attitudes shifted" during college. By her early thirties, she was affiliated with the American Baptist denomination, which she found to be more liberal. In the 1980s, she was pastor of Faith Baptist Church in Southington, Connecticut, during which the church was primed for an expansion that would, according to Anderson, allow the church to "minister to the needs of people more effectively." In Connecticut, she felt that her "openness" was out of place, being the only pastor in that denomination in New England who supported the concept of ordaining women.

== Rhode Island State Council of Churches (2007–2020) ==
Anderson was a pastor for the First Baptist Church in East Greenwich, before joining the Rhode Island State Council of Churches (RISCC) around 2007. She served as RISCC's executive minister, a role in which she acted as a "face" of the organization, which in 2012 represented churches from thirteen Protestant and eight Orthodox denominations in addition to seven church-affiliated groups. In this capacity, she was among the opponents of legislative efforts in 2008 allowing 24-hour gambling in two casinos in the state; spoke in favor of a 2011 lawsuit against the city of Cranston by the American Civil Liberties Union to remove a prayer banner displayed in Cranston High School West (Ahlquist v. Cranston); was among religious leaders who gave testimony at the Rhode Island State House in favor of a 2013 same-sex marriage bill; and led interfaith sanctuary church efforts in 2017. Anderson participated in the 2017 Women's March in Washington, D.C., held after the inauguration of Donald Trump as president, and shortly after she signed a petition opposing Executive Order 13769, one of the executive actions comprising the Trump travel ban, alongside other religious leaders in the state.

A transgender woman, Anderson experienced gender dysphoria since childhood and an interest in "the feminine" when she was growing up, and she started transgender hormone therapy in 2017. She was nearly 70 years old when she told her family she was transgender, and she made her identity public knowledge in May 2018, when she announced her intent to take a three-month sabbatical to begin her male-to-female gender transition through the summer. During the sabbatical, she had her name changed to Donnie and her wife began using her maiden name again; she returned to her position as executive minister in September 2018.

Anderson resigned from her position as executive minister at the start of 2020 after she "felt a call to church ministry." She moved to Provincetown, Massachusetts to become the pastor at the United Methodist Church later that March.

== Political activities (2022–present) ==
Anderson ran as a candidate in the 2022 Democratic primary for the Rhode Island General Assembly seat for Senate District 1 in Providence, challenging incumbent Maryellen Goodwin, the majority whip of the state senate. She was reported to be one of three transgender people running in the primaries in September, who, if elected, would be the first transgender person to join the General Assembly. Goodwin ultimately won the primary.

In 2023, Anderson ran unopposed in the election for chair of the Rhode Island Democratic Women's Caucus – an organization that separated from the state Democratic Party over new party bylaws forbidding it from spending and making statements and political endorsements. At the time of her election, she was a minister at the Pilgrim United Church of Christ in New Bedford, Massachusetts. She moderated the caucus's forum for Democratic Party congressional candidates in the special election for the 1st congressional district that year. Allen Waters, a former Republican who was running in the race, said in an open letter to the caucus that he would not participate because Anderson was transgender. Waters's remarks were rebuked by Anderson and other candidates including local and state political figures Aaron Regunberg, Sabina Matos, Gabe Amo, and John Goncalves.

== Personal life ==
Anderson came out as a transgender woman to her wife in 2018, 23 years into their marriage, and they subsequently separated. She married another woman once again in 2025.

== See also ==
- LGBT history in Rhode Island
