= Ahlqvist =

Ahlqvist is a Swedish surname. Notable people with the surname include:

- Aleksis Ahlqvist (born 1986), Finnish ice hockey player
- August Ahlqvist (1826–1889), Finnish poet, writer and literary critic
- Birgitta Ahlqvist (born 1948), Swedish politician
- Pepe Ahlqvist (born 1956), Finnish musician
- Thure Ahlqvist (1907–1983), Swedish boxer

== See also ==
- 11305 Ahlqvist, a main-belt minor planet
- Ahlquist, a surname
