= Freedom from religion =

Freedom from religion may refer to:

- Aspect of, or contrast to, various conceptions of freedom of religion
- Irreligion
- Secularism
- Separation of church and state
- The Freedom From Religion Foundation
