= Godless =

Godless may refer to:

- Godlessness, the absence of theism

== Books ==
- Godless (Barker book), a 2008 book by Dan Barker
- Godless (novel), a 2004 young adult novel by Pete Hautman
- Godless: The Church of Liberalism, a 2006 book written by Ann Coulter

== Film and television ==
- Godless (film), a 2016 Bulgarian drama film
- Godless: The Eastfield Exorcism, a 2023 Australian horror film
- Godless (miniseries), a Netflix miniseries released in 2017

== Music ==
- Godless(band) is a Black Metal band formed in 1989 (U.S.A./Puerto Rico)
- "Godless" (song), a song by The Dandy Warhols
- "Godless", a song by U.P.O. from the 2000 album No Pleasantries
- Godless, an EP by Catalepsy
