= Oz Squad =

Comics based on the Wizard of Oz

- Format: Ongoing series
- Publication date: 1991 – 1996

Creative team
- Written by: Steve Ahlquist
- Artist: Andrew Murphy
- Inker: Dan Schaefer

Oz Squad is a comic book series using characters and setting from L. Frank Baum's Land of Oz series, "updated for a more adult audience". It was created and written by Steve Ahlquist.

== Publication ==
The original series ran for ten issues from 1991 to 1996. The first four were illustrated by Andrew Murphy, inked by Daniel Schaffer, and published by Brave New Words, which also later reprinted the first two issues with alternative covers. Millennium Publications then produced a 48-page Oz Squad Special. Finally, Ahlquist and some friends created Patchwork Press to carry on publishing the book. Terry Loh drew the last six issues, and Mike Sagara illustrated a Little Oz Squad special.

Ahlquist published a new Oz Squad novel in 2011, Oz Squad: March of the Tin Soldiers.

== Plot ==
The series adapts the mythology that Baum had created in the original children's books and updates it with the intention of appealing to a more adult audience.

Oz Squad's first issue featured Tik-Tok's becoming insane and violent after his "internal clockwork morality spring" runs down during a visit to Earth (it would run down more rarely in Oz, where decisions are more "black and white"). Later issues featured an assault on the hideout of Rebecca Eastwitch (the Wicked Witch of the East) at Castle Munchausen, and a series of time travel adventures in which the Scarecrow met Leonardo da Vinci and Joan of Arc, Dorothy found herself in the American Old West, and Nick met himself while still a human. The series ended with Dorothy Gale revealing that she is pregnant to Princess Ozma.

In the 2011 Oz Squad: March of the Tin Soldiers, the Squad is in conflict with Rebecca Eastwitch and introduces Ozzy, Dorothy and Ozma's son.

=== Reviews ===
The series provoked a strong negative response from many fans of Baum's Oz. Pittsburg State University English professor Steven J. Teller reviewed it for The Baum Bugle and considered it worthless and disgusting.

When the series was reprinted, the Bugle was much kinder to it, and referred to Teller's review, suggesting that with the Oz books so recently having fallen into the public domain, there was little else like it, but post-Wicked, it seems groundbreaking and not nearly as outrageous as it did at the time.

== Characters ==
- Dorothy Gale
- Scarecrow
- Nick Chopper, the Tin Woodman
- Cowardly Lion
- Tik-Tok
- Rebecca, Wicked Witch of the East
- Kalidah
- Jellia Jamb
- Oscar Zoroaster Phadrig Isaac Norman Henkle Emmannuel Ambroise Diggs, the Wizard of Oz
- Hammerheads
- Glinda the Good
- Ozma
- Jack Pumpkinhead
- Mombi
- Sawhorse
- Jinjur
- Professor Wogglebug
- Gump
- Hungry Tiger
- Button Bright
- Polychrome
- Bungle the Glass Cat
- Woozy
- Betsy Bobbin
- Trot
- Cap'n Bill
- Orks
- Flying Monkeys
- Santa Claus
- L. Frank Baum

== See also ==
- Oz (comics)
