= Rhode Island's Future =

Former Rhode Island political blog

Rhode Island's Future was a Rhode Island blog dubbed the "state's most popular political blog" by the Phoenix newspaper.

The blog was started in March 2005 by political activist Matthew Jerzyk, a long-time community and union organizer with SEIU and Jobs with Justice. Contributing to this was state representative David Segal, the first Green Party elected official in Rhode Island's history (who later became a Democrat).

Rhode Island's Future played a key role in the 2006 Senate race between Sheldon Whitehouse and Lincoln Chafee by exposing a scandal involving a Chafee staffer sending controversial emails from a government computer just one week before the election. Jerzyk, the blog's editor, also played a central role in a prominent controversy at Roger Williams University School of Law involving the chairman of the university's board of trustees use of the racist slur "nigger" and the subsequent removal of his name from the law school.

In late 2015, the site listed its "most prolific writers" as: Bob Plain (its editor), Steve Ahlquist, Samuel G. Howard, Tom Sgouros, Andrew Stewart, Brian Hull, Samuel Bell, Dave Fisher, Frymaster, Peter Nightingale, Elisha Aldrich, Bruce Reilly, transportprovidence, Mark Binder, and Russ Conway.
