= Strange Eggs =

Strange Eggs is a one-shot anthology of stories created by Steve Ahlquist and Chris Reilly, published by SLG Publishing (formerly Slave Labor Graphics).

The Strange Eggs concept has been extended from the original premise to The Weirdly World of Strange Eggs, a graphic novel based on the premise and aimed at younger children, and Strange Eggs Jumps the Shark. Contributing artists include: Roger Langridge, Tommy Kovac, and J. Chris Campbell.
