= Newport sex scandal =

1919 US Naval investigation into possible homosexual activity of personnel

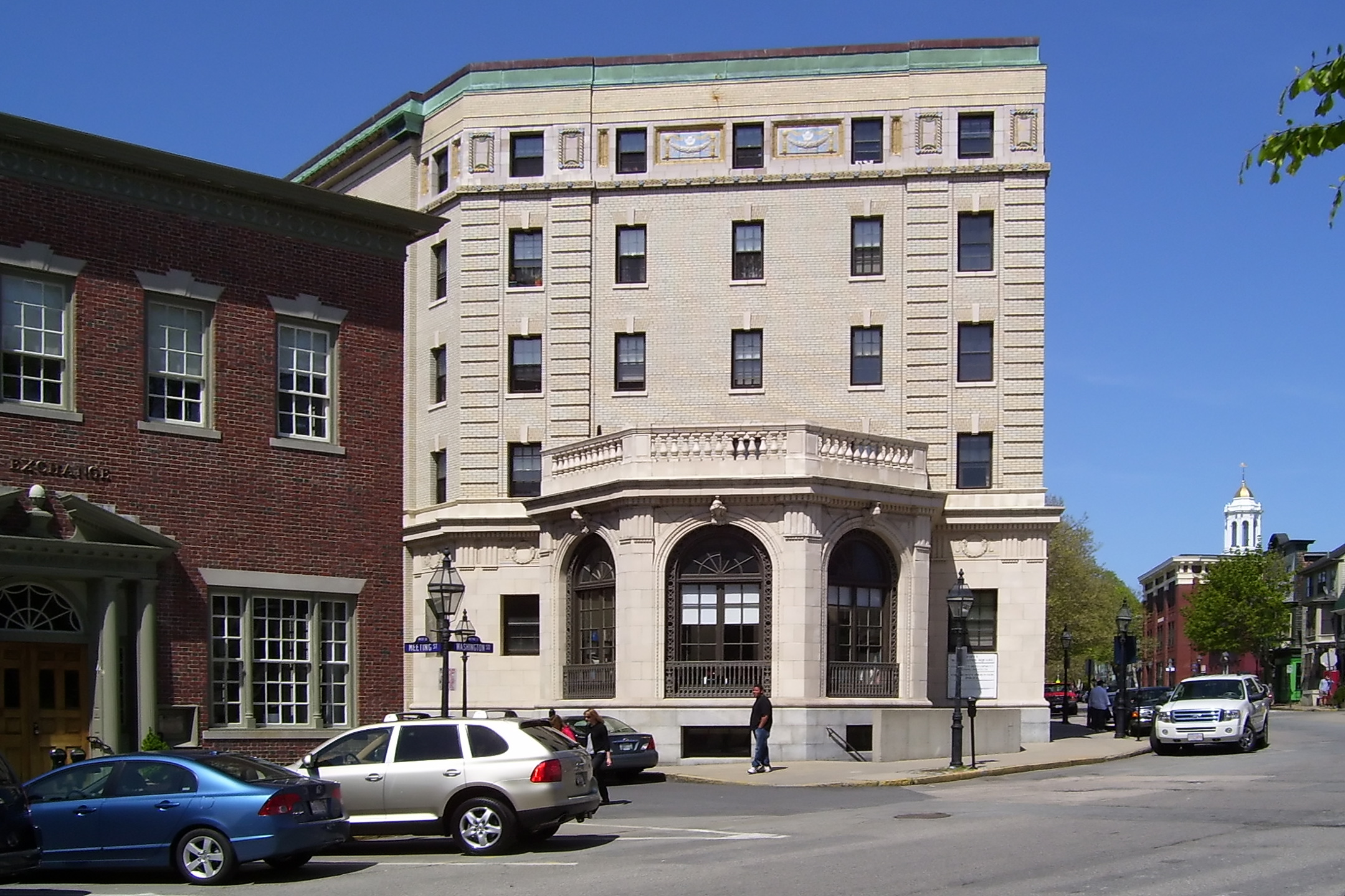
The Army and Navy YMCA in Newport, Rhode Island, where the investigation primarily occurred.

The Newport sex scandal arose from a 1919 investigation by the United States Navy into homosexual acts by Navy personnel and civilians in Newport, Rhode Island. The investigation was noted for its controversial methods of intelligence gathering, specifically its use of enlisted personnel to investigate alleged homosexuals by engaging them sexually. A subsequent trial attracted national news coverage and provoked a congressional investigation, which concluded with Secretary of the Navy Josephus Daniels and Assistant Secretary of the Navy (and future United States president) Franklin D. Roosevelt being formally rebuked by a Congressional committee.

Even by the standards of the early 1920s—when homosexuality was widely criminalized and heavily stigmatized—many people believed the Navy’s investigation went too far, however public outrage was mainly caused by the Navy’s investigative methods, not by sympathy for homosexuality itself.

== History ==
=== Background and investigation ===
In February 1919, sailor Thomas Brunelle and chief machinist's mate Ervin Arnold were patients at the naval hospital at Naval Station Newport in Newport, Rhode Island. Brunelle disclosed to Arnold that both naval and civilian men who have sex with men regularly met at the Army and Navy YMCA and the Newport Art Club for companionship and sex. Arnold independently investigated Brunelle's claims, discovering parties involving cross-dressing, same-sex sexual activity, and liquor and cocaine use at the locations.

Arnold presented his Navy superiors with a detailed report of his findings. Admiral Spencer S. Wood, commander of the 2nd Naval District, ordered an investigation and created a court of inquiry to review Arnold's claims. On March 19, 1919, the court concluded that a thorough investigation was warranted. Assistant Secretary of the Navy Franklin D. Roosevelt approved the court's recommendation, and asked Attorney General A. Mitchell Palmer to undertake the investigation.

Palmer assigned Arnold, a former Connecticut state detective, to lead the investigation. With an infiltration approach in mind, he chose his investigators on the basis of their youth and looks. Over a period of several weeks, 13 such agents submitted daily reports to Arnold that included candid descriptions of homosexual acts and their participation in them. They rarely reported any hesitancy or qualms about their direct participation.

Historian David Michaelis concludes that FDR, “a subcabinet official . . . knew perfectly well—indeed had, tried to cover up—that his own secret orders for the sting operation had put young enlisted men in ‘a most deplorable, disgraceful, and unnatural’ position.’”

=== Arrests and trial ===
Arrests began on April 4, and by April 22, fifteen sailors had been arrested. Each was brought before a court-martial and heard men whom they recognized as former sexual partners provide graphic testimony of their encounters. Older naval officers were confounded by the terms used by the investigators. Once the operatives had presented their evidence before the court, the accused were encouraged to incriminate others and many did so, in hopes of leniency. Brunelle incriminated some but withheld the names of his closest friends.

The three-week military trial ended with the court-martial of 17 sailors charged with sodomy and "scandalous conduct." Most were sent to the naval prison at the Portsmouth Naval Shipyard in Maine. Two more were dishonorably discharged and two others were found innocent with no further action.

=== Press coverage and political fallout ===
The Providence Journal, under editor John R. Rathom, covered the trial proceedings daily, often with a critical eye toward the prosecution's case. On January 8, 1920, Rev. Samuel Neal Kent, an Episcopal clergyman, was found not guilty on all charges. In his charge to the jury in that case, the judge was at pains to discredit the witnesses who described their participation in illicit sexual acts. He reasoned that since no military or governmental authority could legitimately order them to participate in such acts against their will, either they were willing participants, whose complaints were groundless, or they were acting under the compulsion of unlawful commands, on the part of their superiors. His analysis fueled opposition in Newport's religious community.

Within days, a committee of Newport clergymen drafted a lengthy letter to President Woodrow Wilson denouncing the Navy's activities in Newport, specifically the "deleterious and vicious methods" used, including keeping those charged confined for months without trial. Among the signatories were Rev. William Safford Jones of Channing Church, Rev. J. Howard Deming, Rev. Everett P. Smith of St. Mary's Church, Portsmouth, and Rev. Richard Arnold Greene of Newport.

The Providence Journal published the letter, which put the Navy on the defensive and named Secretary of the Navy Josephus Daniels and Roosevelt. Assistant Secretary Roosevelt angrily charged that press coverage like Rathom's would damage the Navy's reputation to the point that parents would not allow their sons to enlist. Also at issue, however, were the methods employed in the investigation. Rathom and Roosevelt had a "tart exchange of telegrams" disputing whether anyone in the naval hierarchy in Washington had supervised the investigation closely or authorized the actual participation of investigators in illicit acts.

While investigations dragged, Roosevelt resigned from his position as Assistant Secretary of the Navy in July 1920 when he accepted the Democratic Party's nomination for vice president. He and presidential candidate James M. Cox were on the losing end of Warren G. Harding's landslide victory that year.

On July 19, 1921, a subcommittee of the Senate Committee on Naval Affairs denounced both Daniels and Roosevelt for the methods used in the Newport investigations. The New York Times reported that most of the details of the affair were "of an unprintable nature" but explained that the committee believed that Daniels and Roosevelt knew that "enlisted men of the navy were used as participants in immoral practices for the purpose of obtaining evidence."

The committee report declared that using enlisted men in this way "violated the code of the American citizen and ignored the rights of every American boy who enlisted in the navy to fight for his country." The committee report also made public the earlier determination of a naval court-martial. To the court-martial's assessment that Roosevelt's behavior was "unfortunate and ill-advised," the committee added "reprehensible." Daniels's rejection of the court's judgment, the committee declared, "is to be severely condemned."

Given how difficult all concerned found to discuss the details of the crimes at issue, their language characterizes the questionable activities repeatedly without ever specifying the actions themselves. They refer to a "lack of moral perspective" and invoked the youth of the navy personnel: "Conduct of a character at which seasoned veterans of the service would have shuddered was practically forced upon boys." Their most explicit description said that the navy personnel allowed "to be performed upon them immoral acts." Also, the committee wrote that for Daniels and Roosevelt to allow personnel to be placed in a position in which the acts were even liable to occur, was "a deplorable, disgraceful, and most unnatural proceeding." Finally, the committee acknowledged that naval officials were facing a serious problem in Newport, and it denounced "immoral conditions" that were "a menace to both the health and the morale of the men in the naval training station."

=== Aftermath ===
Roosevelt rejected the report, noting that the subcommittee's two Republican members had condemned him while the one Democrat issued a minority report. He contested many details and interpretations in the committee's report, and then went on the attack: "This business of using the navy as a football of politics has got to stop." He had nothing to say about the court-martial's assessment.

== In media ==
- In his 2014 book, Certainty, author Victor Bevine gives a fictional account of the scandal from the courtroom perspective of a young lawyer, William Bartlett, who defends a local clergyman, Samuel Kent, accused of sexual impropriety with the Newport sailors.
- The 2014 short film Roosevelt's Operative tells of a Navy recruiter (Nathaniel Grant) recalling the enlistment of sailors during the scandal.

== Bibliography ==
- Garrett D. Byrnes and Charles H. Spilman, The Providence Journal 150 Years (Providence, RI: The Providence Journal Company, 1980)
- George Chauncey, "Christian Brotherhood or Sexual Perversion? Homosexual Identities and the Construction of Sexual Boundaries in the World War One Era." Journal of Social History Vol. 19, No. 2 (Winter, 1985), pp. 189–211
- Carroll Kilpatrick, ed., Roosevelt and Daniels: A Friendship in Politics (Chapel Hill: University of North Carolina Press, 1952) OCLC 466453
- Lawrence R. Murphy, Perverts by Official Order: The Campaign Against Homosexuals by the United States Navy (Haworth Press, 1988) ISBN 0866567089
- David O'Toole, Sex, Spies, and Videotape: Outing the Senator (Worcester, MA: James Street Publishing, 2005) ISBN 097719700X
- The Providence Journal: Mark Arsenault, "1919 Newport sting targeted gay sailors, ended in scandal" April 13, 2009, accessed Dec 6, 2009
- Time: John R. Rathom, Dec. 24, 1923. accessed Dec 6, 2009
- William Wright, Harvard's Secret Court: The Savage 1920 Purge of Campus Homosexuals (New York: St. Martin's Press, 2005) ISBN 0312322712
