= Godless (Barker book) =

Deconversion story of former evangelical minister, Dan Barker

Godless: How an Evangelical Preacher Became One of America's Leading Atheists
- Author: Dan Barker
- Language: English
- Genre: Memoir
- Publication date: 2008

Godless: How an Evangelical Preacher Became One of America's Leading Atheists is a book which was written by Dan Barker in 2008, in which he describes his deconversion from being a preacher to becoming an atheist.

The book is divided into four sections. The first section provides the story of Barker's deconversion from an evangelical minister to an atheist. Sections Two and Three contain arguments against the existence of God. Section Four describes some of his work with the Freedom From Religion Foundation.

== Reception ==
Gregg Ten Elshof of Biola University noted that "as a 'fascinating memoir' the book is a success" but that the second and third sections were mostly unoriginal and underdeveloped, but still comprehensive in breadth. Jason Rosenhouse regarded the book as giving an "impressively lucid, and very readable, treatment" of the issues surrounding cosmological arguments. Atheist writer Betty Brogaard wrote "his honesty about how he gradually separated himself from religious superstition is not only refreshing but inspiring".
