= The Real Housewives of Rhode Island =

American reality television series

- Genre: Reality television
- Starring: Alicia Carmody; Rosie DiMare; Ashley Iaconetti; Liz McGraw; Rulla Nehme Pontarelli; Kelsey Swanson; Jo-Ellen Tiberi
- Country of origin: United States
- Original language: English
- No. of seasons: 1
- No. of episodes: 14

Production
- Executive producers: Lucilla D'Agostino; Barry Poznick; Jen McClure-Metz; Joseph Ferraro; Bianca Barnes-Williams; James Brangert; David Mills; Deanna Markoff; Andy Cohen
- Camera setup: Multiple
- Production company: Evolution Media

Original release
- Network: Bravo
- Release: April 2, 2026 – present

Related
- The Real Housewives of New Jersey

The Real Housewives of Rhode Island, abbreviated RHORI, is an American reality television series that premiered on Bravo on April 2, 2026. Developed as the network's twelfth installment of The Real Housewives franchise, it focuses on the personal and professional lives of a tight-knit circle of women living in Rhode Island.

== Overview ==
On May 7, 2025, Bravo announced The Real Housewives of Rhode Island as the latest entry in The Real Housewives franchise. Dolores Catania of The Real Housewives of New Jersey appears as a friend of the main cast. On November 16, 2025, the first season was confirmed to premiere in 2026, with Alicia Carmody, Rosie DiMare, Ashley Iaconetti, Liz McGraw, Rulla Nehme Pontarelli, Kelsey Swanson, and Jo-Ellen Tiberi as full-time housewives, with Catania serving as a "friend of the housewives". In May 2026, the series was renewed for a second season. In July of the same year, McGraw announced her departure from the series.

== Cast ==
Timeline of the cast
Cast member	Seasons
Cast member	1
Alicia Carmody	Main
Rosie DiMare	Main
Ashley Iaconetti	Main
Liz McGraw	Main
Rulla Nehme Pontarelli	Main
Kelsey Swanson	Main
Jo-Ellen Tiberi	Main
Friends of the housewives
Dolores Catania	Friend

== Episodes ==
The Real Housewives of Rhode Island episodes
Season	Episodes	Originally released		Average Viewers
Season	Episodes	First released	Last released	Average Viewers
1	14	April 2, 2026	June 28, 2026	0.41

== Reception ==
The series' premiere attracted 2.7 million viewers across various platforms within seven days of its debut on April 2, 2026, marking Bravo's largest multi-platform premiere since 2024, as reported by NBCUniversal. The episode also achieved the distinction of being the most-watched series or season premiere for a Bravo original on Peacock within its first seven days, as reported by the company.
