= Dan Barker =

American atheist activist and musician

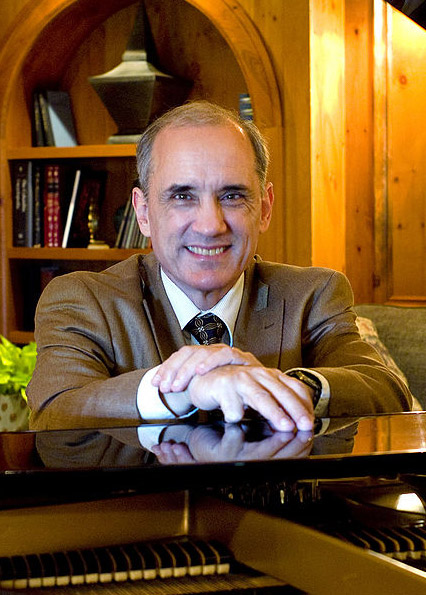
- Born: Daniel Edwin Barker; June 25, 1949 (age 77); Santa Monica, California, U.S.
- Education: Azusa Pacific University
- Occupations: Co-president, Freedom From Religion Foundation, author, musician
- Known for: Advocacy of atheism and rationalism; Criticism of religion
- Voice of Dan Barker

Daniel Edwin Barker (born June 25, 1949) is an American atheist activist and musician who served as an evangelical Christian preacher and composer for 19 years but left Christianity in 1984. He and his wife Annie Laurie Gaylor are the current co-presidents of the Freedom From Religion Foundation, and he is cofounder of The Clergy Project. He has written numerous articles for Freethought Today, an American freethought newspaper. He is the author of several books including Losing Faith in Faith: From Preacher to Atheist.

Barker has been an invited speaker at Rock Beyond Belief. He is on the speakers bureau of the Secular Student Alliance.

== Biography ==
Barker received a degree in religion from Azusa Pacific University and was ordained to the ministry by the Standard Community Church, California, in 1975. He served as associate pastor at several churches: Religious Society of Friends (Quaker), a church in the Assemblies of God fellowship, and an independent Charismatic church. He receives royalties from his popular children's Christian musicals, Mary Had a Little Lamb (1977) and His Fleece Was White as Snow (1978), both published by Manna Music.

In 1984, he announced to his friends, family, and co-ministers that he had become an atheist, and appeared on AM Chicago (hosted by Oprah Winfrey) later that year on a show about "kicking the religion habit".

== Personal life ==
Barker and Gaylor met when both were guests on the show. They began dating six months later and married in 1987. They have a daughter, Sabrina Delata.

He is a member of the Lenni Lenape Delaware Tribe of Indians, and in 1991 edited and published Paradise Remembered, a collection of his grandfather's stories as a Lenape boy in Indian Territory.

== Freedom from Religion Foundation ==
Barker introduces himself and the Freedom From Religion Foundation.

He is the current co-president with his wife Annie Laurie Gaylor of the Freedom from Religion Foundation, an American freethought organization that promotes the separation of church and state. Barker is co-host of Freethought Radio, a radio program based in Madison, Wisconsin for atheists, agnostics, and other freethinkers that began in 2006 and has included interviews with Richard Dawkins, Sam Harris, Steven Pinker, Christopher Hitchens, Philip Pullman, Daniel C. Dennett, Ron Reagan, Julia Sweeney, and Michael Newdow.

== Media appearances ==
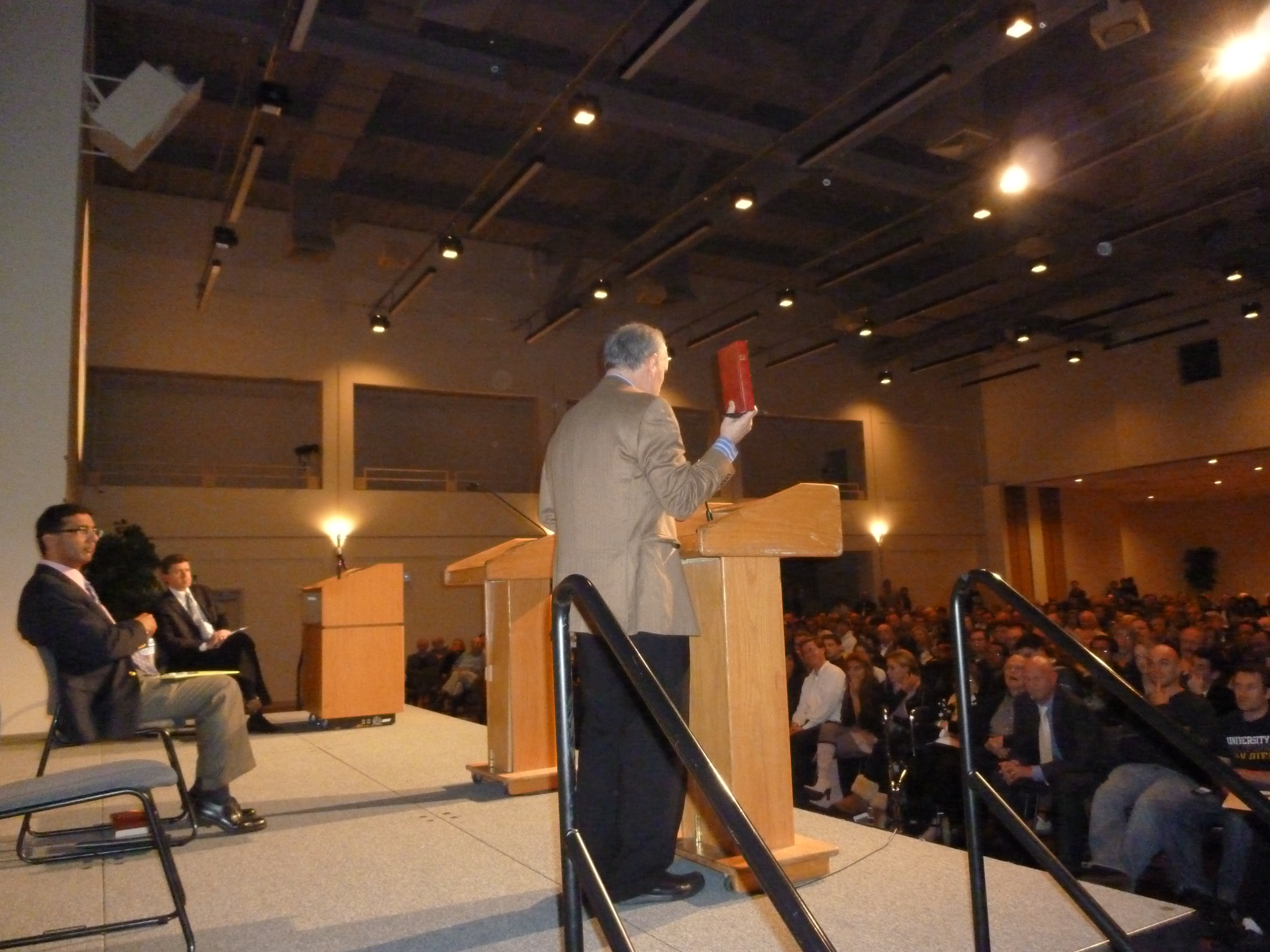
Barker with a red Bible, debating Dinesh D'Souza at UCSD in 2011.

Barker has appeared on dozens of national television and radio programs to discuss and debate issues related to atheism and the separation of state and church. He has discussed nativity scenes on government property, the campaign against a Mother Teresa stamp, prayer in public schools, and has appeared on Oprah Winfrey, The O’Reilly Factor, Tucker Carlson, Laura Ingraham, Phil Donahue, Hannity & Colmes, Maury Povich, Good Morning America, Sally Jessy Raphael, and Tom Leykis, as well as many international television and radio shows.

He was featured in a New York Times article about the growth of atheism in Southern states, has given addresses on his own "de-conversion" across the United States, and has participated in more than 140 debates around the country and the world.

Barker and his wife host a weekly one-hour radio program, Freethought Radio. It is carried on several stations throughout the Midwest and is available through podcast.

== Publications ==
Musicals

- Mary Had a Little Lamb (Manna Music 1977)
- His Fleece Was White as Snow (Manna Music 1978)

Books

- Barker, Dan (1990). Maybe Yes, Maybe No: A Guide for Young Skeptics. Prometheus Books. ISBN 978-0879756079.
- Barker, Dan (1992). Maybe Right, Maybe Wrong: A Guide for Young Thinkers. Prometheus Books. ISBN 978-0879757311.
- Barker, Dan (1992). Losing Faith in Faith: From Preacher to Atheist. Madison, WI: Freedom From Religion Foundation. ISBN 978-1877733130.
- Barker, Dan (2002). Just Pretend. Freedom From Religion Foundation. ISBN 978-1877733055.
- Barker, Dan (2008). Godless: How an Evangelical Preacher Became One of America's Leading Atheists. Ulysses Press. ISBN 978-1569756775.
- Barker, Dan (2011). The Good Atheist: Living a Purpose-Filled Life Without God. Ulysses Press. ISBN 978-1569758465.
- Barker, Dan (2015). Life Driven Purpose: How an Atheist Finds Meaning. Pitchstone Publishing. ISBN 978-1939578211.
- Barker, Dan (2016). GOD: The Most Unpleasant Character in All Fiction. Sterling. ISBN 978-1454918325.
- Barker, Dan (2023). GOD: The Most Unpleasant Character in All Fiction (expanded reprint). Prometheus Books. ISBN 978-1633888760.
- Barker, Dan (2018). Free Will Explained: How Science and Philosophy Converge To Create a Beautiful Illusion. Sterling. ISBN 978-1454927358.
- Barker, Dan (2024). Contraduction. Hypatia Press. ISBN 978-1839195976.

Music albums

- Night at Nakoma (2008, piano solo)
- Friendly Neighborhood Atheist (2002, FFRF album)
- Beware of Dogma (2004, FFRF album)
- Adrift On A Star (2013, FFRF album)
