= Rosie DiMare =

American TV personality (born 1991)

Rosie Woods DiMare
- Born: Rosemary Woods; April 23, 1991 (age 35); Milton, Massachusetts
- Education: Boston University (BS)
- Occupations: Television personality; Producer; Host
- Years active: 2013–present
- Television: The Real Housewives of Rhode Island
- Spouse: Rich DiMare (m. 2024)

Rosie Woods DiMare (born 26 April 1991) is an American television personality, producer and host notable for being a main cast member on Bravo's The Real Housewives of Rhode Island. DiMare is a former local TV news anchor and founder of the production company A Rosie Production.

== Early life ==
Rosemary Woods DiMare was born on April 23, 1991, in Milton, Massachusetts to an Irish-American family. She has a brother five years younger. They were raised Catholic. DiMare lived in Providence, Rhode Island when she was a child, and was raised primarily in Massachusetts. After high school, DiMare earned a bachelor's degree in Broadcast Journalism from Boston University in 2013.

== Career ==
=== Broadcasting career ===
In 2010, while at Boston University, DiMare interned at iHeartMedia's Kiss 108 (WXKS-FM), Boston's top 40 radio station as a production intern. In 2013 post-graduation, DiMare landed her first role as a news anchor and producer for ABC 57 News (WBND-LD) in South Bend, Indiana, covering the morning news.

In 2014, DiMare went on to work at KIFI Local News 8 in Twin Falls, Idaho covering regional and municipal news, and later at WLOS News 13 in Asheville, North Carolina covering news and lifestyle from 2015 to 2016.

In 2016, DiMare made her return to New England, joining WPRI Channel 12 and WNAC Fox 6 in Providence, Rhode Island as a multimedia journalist and news reporter, where she covered local stories across southeastern New England for 5 years.

In 2021, DiMare joined NBC's Rhode Island's news station WJAR Channel 10, where she became a prominent face on the "NBC 10 Sunrise Crew" as the on-air traffic reporter. DiMare's role eventually expanded into co-hosting the station's daytime program, Studio 10, which went on to become the number one lifestyle show in New England.

In 2024, following a decade in broadcasting, DiMare left WJAR and established her own production company, A Rosie Production. DiMare developed Rhode Trippin', a lifestyle show highlighting Rhode Island, which premiered on 22 July 2024. DiMare and her husband also produce and host events through their company Reprise Events.

=== Reality Television ===
In 2025, DiMare joined the cast of The Real Housewives of Rhode Island, which premiered on April 2, 2026. The show was Bravo’s biggest multiplatform series premiere since 2024 with 2.7M viewers, and was Peacock's most-watched series or season premiere of all time for a Bravo original on Peacock in its first week.

In May 2026 at the NBCUniversal Upfronts, Bravo executive producer and host Andy Cohen announced the show was renewed for its second season after just 7 episodes, following its record breaking premiere.

== Personal life ==
DiMare met her husband Rich DiMare in 2010, when she began working at Kiss 108, Boston's top 40 radio station, where Rich DiMare was an on-air radio personality and producer for the morning show, Matty in the Morning. They went on their first date 12 years later, after reconnecting when they were both in Florida. Both Massachusetts natives, they were married in July 2024 in an intimate wedding in Boston followed by a larger wedding celebration in Palm Beach, Florida. The couple and their dog Clementine live in North Kingstown, Rhode Island.

DiMare has stated in social media that she is a Democrat. DiMare is an outspoken LGTBQ ally and supports Pride events. She was announced as a featured host for the OUTLOUD Music Festival for WeHo Pride 2026. DiMare also frequently supports and hosts drag show events.

== Filmography ==
| Year | Title | Role | Notes |
|---|---|---|---|
| 2013–2014 | ABC 57 News (WBND-LD) | Reporter / Anchor | ABC affiliate; Local news Indiana |
| 2014–2016 | Various local stations | Reporter / Anchor | Local news Idaho and North Carolina |
| 2016–2024 | NBC 10 News Sunrise (WJAR) | Anchor / Traffic Reporter | NBC affiliate; Local Rhode Island news |
| 2016–2024 | Studio 10 (WJAR) | Co-Host | NBC affiliate; Lifestyle program |
| 2024–present | Rhode Trippin' | Co-Host / Producer | A Rosie Production; Lifestyle program |
| 2026–present | The Real Housewives of Rhode Island | Herself | Main cast |
