= Cranston High School West =

Public high school in the United States

Coordinates: 41°46′19″N 71°28′35″W

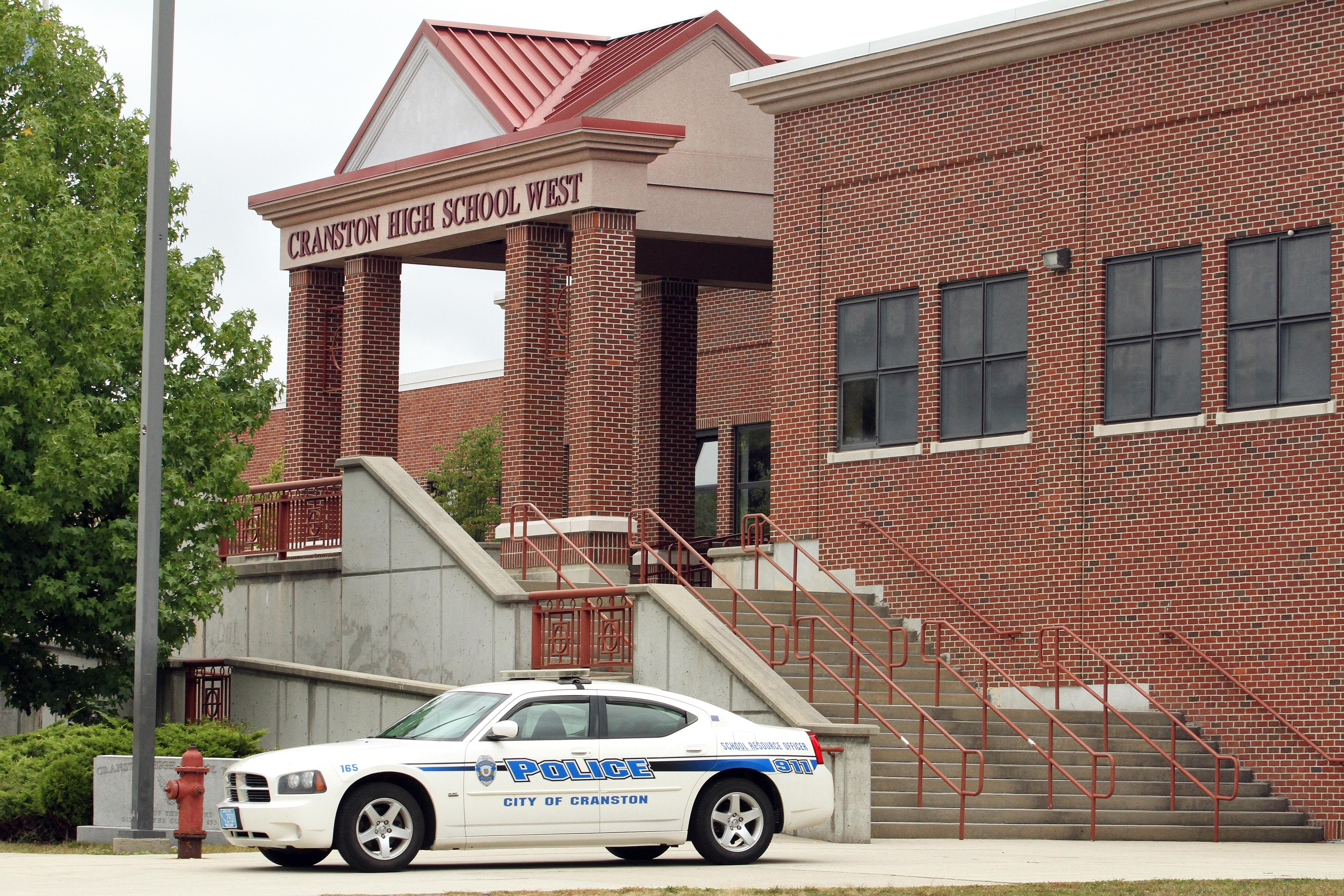
- 80 Metropolitan Ave; Cranston, Rhode Island 02920; United States

Information
- School type: Comprehensive Public High School
- Superintendent: Jeannine Nota-Masse
- Principal: John Fontaine (as of 2022)
- Grades: 9–12
- Enrollment: 1,423 (2016-17)
- Campus type: Suburban
- Colors: scarlet and gray
- Mascot: Falcon
- Rival: Cranston East Thunderbolts
- Feeder schools: Western Hills Middle School; Hope Highlands Middle School
- Website: https://chsw.cpsed.net/

Cranston High School West (often called West, Cranston West or abbreviated as CHSW) is a public high school located in Cranston, Rhode Island, United States.

== History ==
The school comprises five buildings; one of these buildings is the Cranston Area Career and Technical Center. The school grounds include six tennis courts, a baseball field, and a track and football field. West has 155 staff members who work with the student population of approximately 1850 daily. The program of studies encompasses 203 different courses. The Cranston Area Career and Technical Center offers 17 different courses. All courses are geared toward student academic abilities. Fifty-two percent of graduates go on to pursue a four-year degree while twenty-two percent pursue a 2-year degree.

== Athletic ==
Athletic teams that have won State Championship titles:

- Varsity boys volleyball won the State Championship in 2016 and 2019.

== Ahlquist v. Cranston ==
On April 4, 2011, 10th-grade student Jessica Ahlquist filed a federal lawsuit aimed at ending the school's display of a prayer on a banner. District Court Judge Ronald R. Lagueux issued a decision in favor of Jessica on January 11, 2012. The decision was in part based on the Establishment Clause of the First Amendment, and the Lemon v. Kurtzman, Lynch v. Donnelly, and Lee v. Weisman US Supreme Court cases. Upon learning of the results of the case, some residents of Cranston, and others opposed to the decision and to Jessica's atheism, took their anger out on Jessica on Twitter and Facebook, and local florists refused to deliver to her.

== Notable alumni ==
- Joyce Jillson - Actress, writer, astrologer, talk show hostess, and spokesperson for the Women's Equalization Committee.
- Stevie Aiello – singer, songwriter, musician, record producer
- Monty Are I – an alternative rock band named after Arthur Montanaro, a former teacher at West
- Katelyn Bouyssou – member of the US Judo national team; 3 time US Judo national champion
- Marissa Castelli – figure skater, 2-time national pairs champion; bronze medalist in 2014 Winter Olympics
- Mark van Eeghen – former NFL running back and two-time Super Bowl champion with the Oakland Raiders; only person from Cranston West to have number retired in any sport
- JVKE – American singer-songwriter, producer, and social media personality
- Alicia Carmody - Cast member of The Real Housewives of Rhode Island
