= Pepe Ahlqvist =

Finnish blues singer and musician

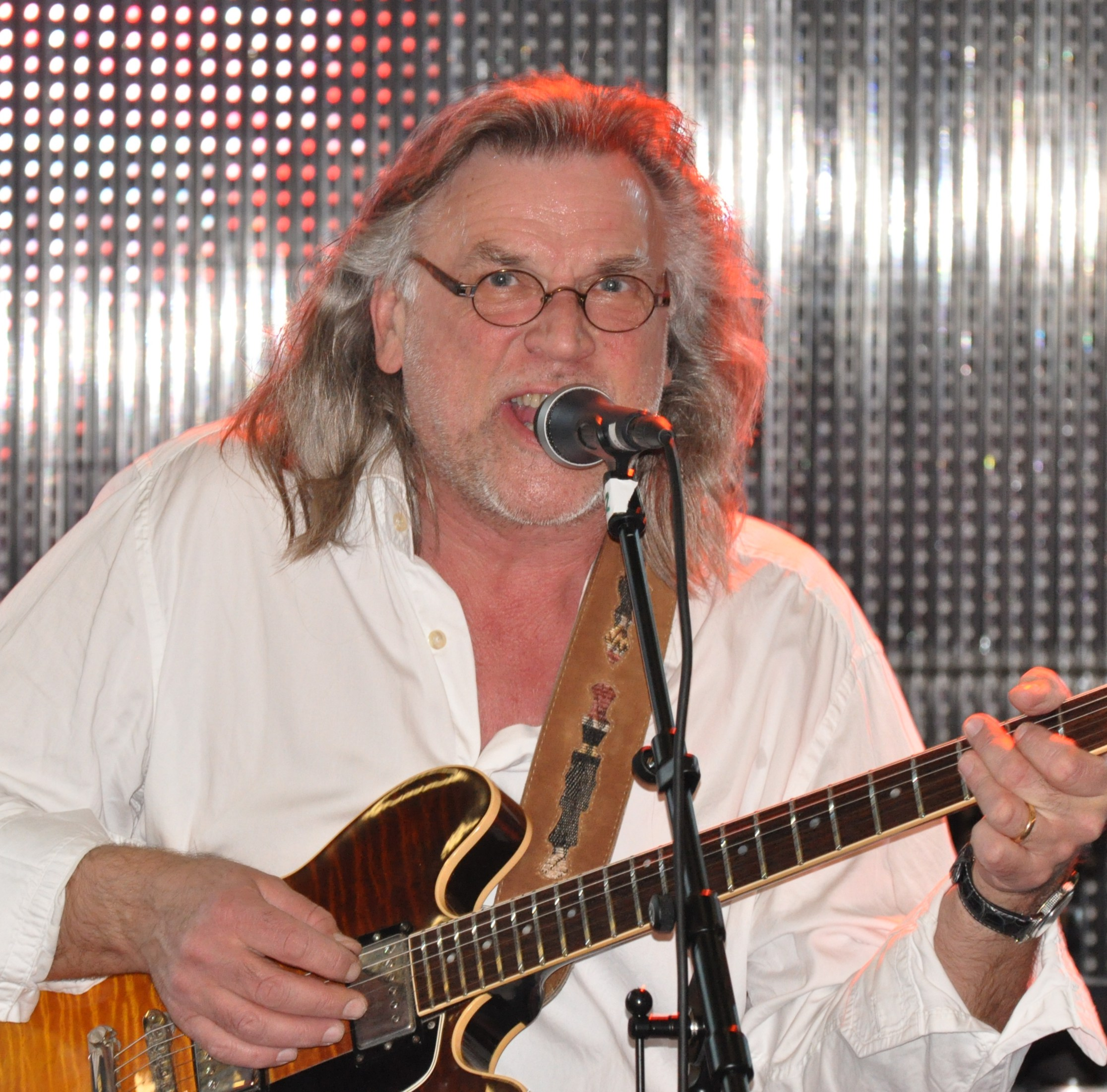
- Pepe at the Helsinki Music Fair, 2011

Background information
- Born: July 4, 1956 (age 68); Nastola, Finland
- Genres: Blues
- Occupations: Musician; singer; songwriter
- Instruments: Vocals; guitar; harmonica
- Years active: late 1960s–present
- Labels: Love; Fazer/Warner Music
- Website: pepeahlqvist.com

Pertti "Pepe" Kalevi Ahlqvist (born July 4, 1956) is a Finnish blues singer and musician.

== Background ==
According to Blues News, he was born Pertti Kalevi Ahlqvist on 4th of July 1956.

The groups that first influenced him were The Beatles and The Rolling Stones, but it was John Mayall’s Bluesbreakers that exposed him to the blues.
