= Freedom from Religion Foundation =

American nonprofit organization

- Abbreviation: FFRF
- Formation: 1976; 50 years ago
- Founded: 1976; 50 years ago
- Founder: Anne Nicol Gaylor
- Type: Non-profit
- Tax ID no.: 39-1302520
- Legal status: 501(c)(3) educational organization
- Purpose: Separation of church and state, nontheism, atheism, secularism
- Headquarters: Madison, Wisconsin, U.S.
- Region served: United States
- Members: 42,000 members
- Co-president: Annie Laurie Gaylor
- Co-president: Dan Barker
- Chair, Board of Directors: Stephen Hirtle
- Revenue: $11.1 million (2024)
- Expenses: $9.89 million (2024)
- Endowment: $26.1 million (2024)
- Website: ffrf.org

The Freedom from Religion Foundation (FFRF) is an American nonprofit organization that advocates for atheists, agnostics, and nontheists.

Formed in 1976, FFRF promotes the separation of church and state, and challenges the legitimacy of federal and state government support for faith-based programs, such as chaplaincy services. It supports groups such as nonreligious students and clergy who want to leave their faith.

== History ==
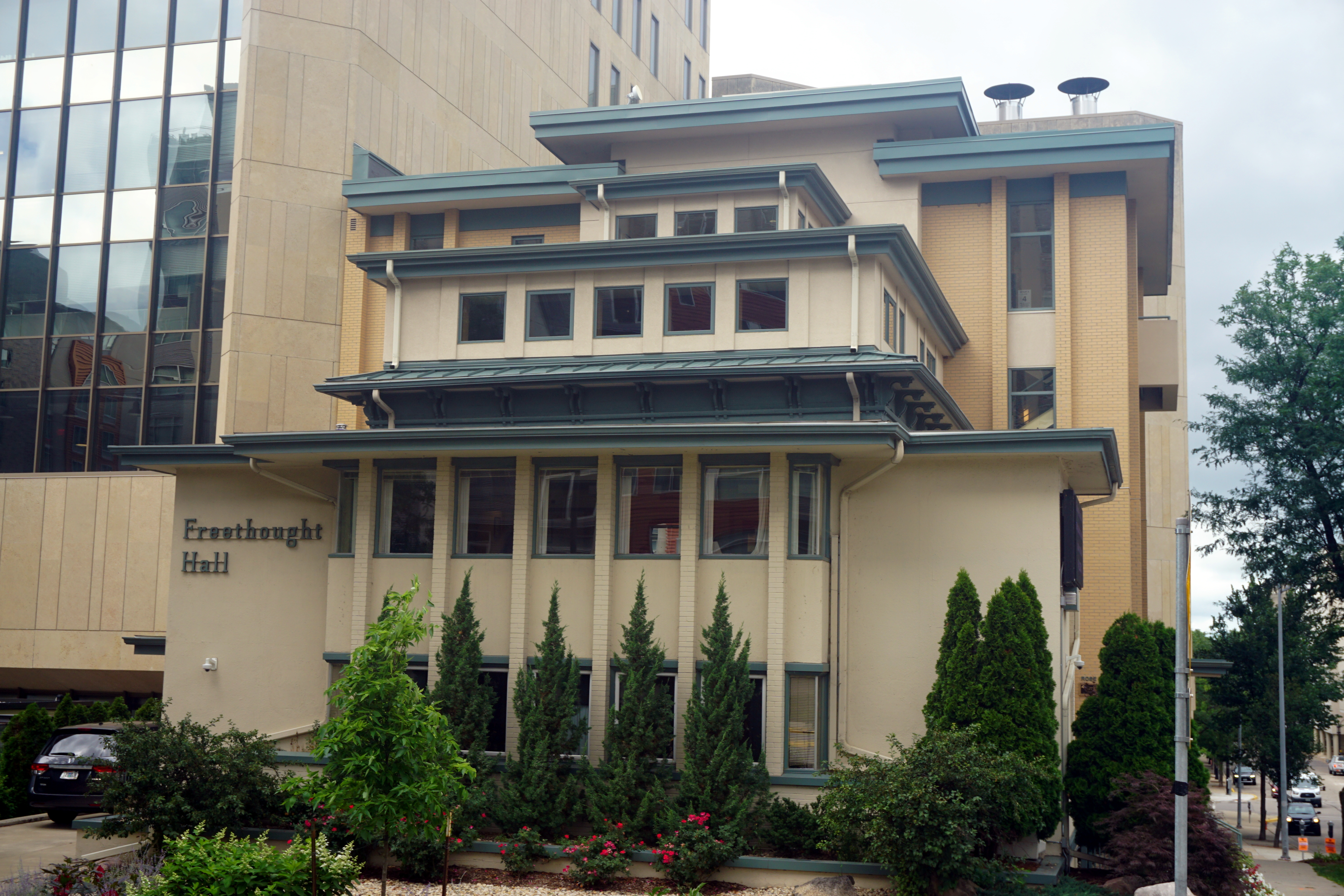
The Freedom from Religion Foundation's Freethought Hall in Madison, Wisconsin

The FFRF was co-founded by Anne Nicol Gaylor and her daughter, Annie Laurie Gaylor, in 1976 and was incorporated nationally on April 15, 1978, who split with Madalyn Murray O'Hair's American Atheists, in response to O'Hair's antisemitism. The organization was supported by over 19,000 members in 2012 and operated from an 1855-era building in Madison, Wisconsin, that once served as a church rectory.

In March 2011, FFRF, along with the Richard Dawkins Foundation for Reason and Science, began The Clergy Project, a confidential on-line community that supports clergy as they leave their faith. In 2012, it gave its first Freedom from Religion Foundation and Clergy Project "Hardship Grant" to Jerry DeWitt, a former pastor who left the ministry to join the atheist movement.

FFRF provides financial support to the Secular Student Alliance, an organization that has affiliate groups for nonreligious students on college campuses.

In 2015, FFRF announced Nonbelief Relief, a related organization that obtained and later gave up its federal tax-exempt status. Nonbelief Relief lost a lawsuit against the IRS because it lacked standing to challenge the Form 990 exemption that applies to churches. Nonbelief Relief is a humanitarian agency for atheists, agnostics, freethinkers, and their supporters. Nonbelief Relief was created by the executive board of FFRF to remediate conditions of human suffering and injustice on a global scale, whether the result of natural disasters, human actions or adherence to religious dogma.

On 7 November 2024, Kat Grant published an article titled "What is a woman", on Freethought Now!, a website operated by the FFRF. The article argued that "any attempt to define womanhood on biological terms is inadequate" and that "a woman is whoever she says she is". In response, Jerry Coyne wrote a rebuttal titled "Biology Is Not Bigotry", defending the "biological definition of 'woman' based on gamete type". Coyne's rebuttal was initially published on Freethought Now!. However, the FFRF later retracted Coyne's page. On 27 December, the FFRF published a statement saying that "Publishing this post was an error of judgment, and we have decided to remove it as it does not reflect our values or principles". In response, Coyne, Steven Pinker, and Richard Dawkins resigned from the honorary board in objection to what they considered the problematic gender-ideological capture of the institute. Coyne stated that LGBTQ people have rights, but some of the desired rights are in conflict with rights of other groups in society. As a result of the division over the issues, FFRF dissolved the honorary board.

== Media and publications ==
The FFRF publishes a newspaper, Freethought Today, ten times a year. Since 2006, as the Freethought Radio Network, FFRF has produced the Freethought Radio show, an hour-long show broadcast live on WXXM-FM Saturdays at 11 a.m. CDT. It had also been broadcast on Air America before that service ceased operation in March 2010. The show is hosted by the co-presidents of FFRF, Dan Barker and Annie Laurie Gaylor. Regular features include "Theocracy Alert" and "Freethinkers Almanac". The latter highlights historic freethinkers, many of whom are also songwriters. The show's intro and outro make use of John Lennon's Imagine song.

Annie Laurie Gaylor, co-president of the FFRF, is the author of the nonfiction book on clergy child sexual abuse scandals Betrayal of Trust: Clergy Abuse of Children (out of print) and the editor of Women Without Superstition: No Gods – No Masters and the anthology Woe to the Women. She edited the FFRF newspaper Freethought Today until July 2008. Her husband, Dan Barker, author of Losing Faith in Faith: From Preacher to Atheist, Godless: How an Evangelical Preacher Became One of America's Leading Atheists, The Good Atheist: Living a Purpose-Filled Life Without God, Life Driven Purpose, God: The Most Unpleasant Character in all Fiction, and Just Pretend: A Freethought Book for Children, is a musician and songwriter, a former Pentecostal Christian minister, and co-president of FFRF.

== Litigation and issues ==
=== Social programs ===
==== Social services ====
In June 2004, the FFRF challenged the constitutionality of the White House Office of Faith-Based and Community Initiatives. The Foundation's complaint alleged that "the use of money appropriated by Congress under Article I, section 8, to fund conferences that various executive branch agencies hold to promote President Bush's 'Faith-Based and Community Initiatives'" conflicted with the First Amendment. The suit "contended that the defendant officials violated the Establishment Clause by organizing national and regional conferences at which faith-based organizations allegedly 'are singled out as being particularly worthy of federal funding because of their religious orientation, and the belief in God is extolled as distinguishing the claimed effectiveness of faith-based social services.'" The FFRF also alleged that "the defendant officials 'engage in myriad activities, such as making public appearances and giving speeches, throughout the United States, intended to promote and advocate for funding for faith-based organizations." The FFRF further asserted, "Congressional appropriations [are] used to support the activities of the defendants." In 2007 the Supreme Court ruled 5–4 that taxpayers do not have the right to challenge the constitutionality of expenditures made by the executive branch.

In May 2007, the FFRF, on behalf of Indiana taxpayers, challenged the creation of a chaplaincy pilot program for the Indiana Family and Social Services Administration (FSSA). The FSSA hired Pastor Michael L. Latham, a Baptist minister, in 2006, at a salary of $60,000 a year. In September 2007, in response to the FFRF's suit, Indiana ended the program.

==== Health care ====
In April 2003, the FFRF, on behalf of Montana residents, sued the Montana Office of Rural Health and its executive director David M. Young along with the Montana State University-Bozeman and the Montana Faith-Health Cooperative. It was alleged that Young favored faith-based nursing parish programs for state funding. In October 2004, the Federal District Court for the District of Montana held that the state's "direct and preferential funding of inherently and pervasively religious parish nursing programs was undertaken for the impermissible purpose, and has the impermissible effect, of favoring and advancing the integration of religion into the provision of secular health care services." According to the court, the state funding of faith-based healthcare violated the First Amendment.

In April 2006, the FFRF sued to challenge the pervasive integration of "spirituality" into health care by the Department of Veteran Affairs. Specifically stating that the practice of asking patients about their religion in spiritual assessments, the use of chaplains to treat patients, and drug and alcohol treatment programs that incorporate religion violated the separation of state and church. The case was later dismissed after the Hein decision because of lack of standing.

==== Education ====
In 2001, the FFRF, on behalf of anonymous plaintiffs, sued the Rhea County School District. The plaintiffs alleged that weekly bible classes were being held for all students in the elementary schools. In June 2004, the Sixth Circuit Court of Appeals affirmed a district judgment holding that it was unconstitutional for the school district to "teach the Bible as literal truth" to students.

In March 2005, the FFRF filed suit against the University of Minnesota because of its involvement with the Minnesota Faith Health Consortium, a partnership with Luther Seminary, which is affiliated with the Evangelical Lutheran Church of America, and Fairview Health Services, stating that state taxpayer funds are helping to fund a faith-based organization. In September 2005, the University agreed to end the partnership and to cease teaching "courses on the intersection of faith and health", with the FFRF agreeing to drop its lawsuit.

In April 2005, the FFRF filed a lawsuit against the U.S. Department of Education because of its distribution of funds to the Alaska Christian College, a Bible college run by the Evangelical Covenant Church of Alaska. The foundation stated that in the students' first year at the college, they take only religious-based courses, and finish that year with a Certificate of Biblical Studies. The college, the foundation says, "does not offer traditional college courses, such as math or English". In October 2005 the FFRF and the U.S. Department of Education settled the lawsuit, with the Department of Education agreeing to suspend the $435,000 federal grant from 2005 and unspent portions of grants from the previous year.

A December 2020 article by Hemant Mehta outlined recent FFRF efforts. FFRF argues to limit official role of Pastor Mark Thornton at Boise State. A letter sent by the FFRF Staff Attorney Chris Line included: "Boise State football players have no government-imposed burden on their religion, so there is no need – or legitimate legal reason – for Boise State to provide a chaplain for them." Legal Counsel for the University responded with the following: "We have been in communication with the Athletic Department to provide some education about this issue and to ensure measures are taken now and in the future to resolve the issue and establish appropriate constitutional boundaries. Mr. Thornton did not travel with the football team to our recent game in Wyoming and the university will no longer include a chaplain in its travel party. Written references to Mr. Thornton as the chaplain of the football team have been or are in the process of being removed and no future references will be made in writing or otherwise." Mehta continues: "None of that means students can't seek Thornton out on their own. They've always been free to do that. But Thornton can't – and shouldn't – have any sort of official role there."

==== Criminal justice programs ====
In October 2000, the FFRF brought suit, as taxpayers in the state of Wisconsin, against Faith Works located in Milwaukee. Their case stated that a faith-based addiction-treatment program should not be used as a court-ordered treatment program using taxpayer funds. In January 2002, the ruling was decided in the FFRF's favor; that receiving hundreds of thousands of dollars in public money is in violation of the Establishment Clause. The judge wrote "Because I find that the Department of Workforce Development's grant to Faith Works constitutes unrestricted, direct funding of an organization that engages in religious indoctrination, I conclude that this funding stream violates the establishment clause." On Appeal, in April 2003, the Seventh Circuit later ruled against the FFRF on the narrower issue of whether prisoners joining specific faith-based programs on their own free will are coerced by government endorsement of religion.

The FFRF brought a suit against the awarding of a federal grant to MentorKids USA, a group providing mentors to children of prisoners, alleging that only Christian mentors were hired and that they were to give monthly reports on the children's religious activities. In January 2005, the court vacated HHS's funding of this group citing "federal funds have been used by the MentorKids program to advance religion in violation of the Establishment Clause".

In May 2006, the FFRF filed suit against the Federal Bureau of Prisons alleging that its decision to fund not only multi-faith-based but also single-faith-based programs violated constitutional standards for separation of state and church. The parties later agreed to a dismissal of that claim, but additional counts within the lawsuit, alleging separate violations, continued.

=== Religion in the public sphere ===
==== Employment issues ====
In 1995, the FFRF sued the state of Wisconsin for designating Good Friday as a state legal holiday. In 1996, the federal district court ruled that Wisconsin's Good Friday holiday was indeed a First Amendment violation because, in reference to Wisconsin's Good Friday holiday law, the "promotion of Christianity is the primary purpose of the law."

==== Public funding ====
FFRF opposed the city of Versailles, Kentucky helping a church get federal funding to create a local disaster relief center.

The FFRF is filing a lawsuit on behalf of four residents against the state of South Carolina to oppose the funding to Christian Learning Centers of Greenville County to build a private religious school, and the FFRF is challenging that it is unconstitutional.

==== Religious displays on public property ====
In December 2007, the FFRF, on behalf of a group of concerned Green Bay residents and invoking the First Amendment rights of all of the city's residents, sued the city because of the placement of a nativity scene at Green Bay's city hall. Before the case was heard, the city removed the nativity scene. The judge then dismissed the suit, citing lack of jurisdiction. Since the nativity scene already was removed and a moratorium imposed on future such displays, there remained no basis for continued dispute. He went on to say, "the plaintiffs have already won. ... the Plaintiffs have won a concrete victory that changes the circumstances on the ground."

In 2011, in response to the refusal of the city of Warren, Michigan, to remove a nativity display in the civic center, the FFRF sought to place a winter solstice display. The mayor refused the request and the FFRF brought suit. The suit was dismissed by Judge Zatkoff of the U.S. District Court; the dismissal was upheld by the U.S. 6th Circuit Court in 2013.

In September 2011, the FFRF, along with the American Civil Liberties Union (ACLU), sued the Giles County, Virginia, school district on behalf of anonymous plaintiffs. A display of the Ten Commandments had been placed beside a copy of the U.S. Constitution at Giles County public schools. Prior to the suit, in January and June 2011, the FFRF and the ACLU had sent letters to the school board requesting removal of the display. The school superintendent ordered that the displays of the Ten Commandments be removed. The Giles County school board met in June 2011 and voted to overturn the superintendent's decision to remove the display. After the suit was filed, the school board in 2012 agreed to remove the display and to pay attorneys' fees.

In November 2011, Wisconsin Governor Scott Walker referred to the Capitol's Christmas tree as a "Christmas tree" instead of a "holiday tree". The FFRF, which opposed prior efforts to restore the name to "Christmas tree" objected to the title.

In May 2012, the FFRF, acting on a complaint from a resident, asked the city of Woonsocket, Rhode Island, to remove a Latin cross from a World War I and II memorial on public land. The city refused to do so. The FFRF states that it is currently looking for a plaintiff in the area to represent for a suit, which the FFRF have yet to do, citing the difficulty with another case that occurred with another plaintiff in the state, Jessica Ahlquist, in the case Ahlquist v. Cranston.

On July 24, 2012, after receiving a letter from the FFRF, the Steubenville, Ohio, city council decided to remove the image of the Christ the King Chapel at the Franciscan University of Steubenville from its town logo.

In August 2012, the FFRF, on behalf of a resident, threatened a lawsuit challenging a Latin cross that had been displayed on top of the water tower of Whiteville, Tennessee. After the FFRF wrote three initial letters, but before the lawsuit was filed, the town removed one arm of the cross. The removal cost the town $4,000, and as part of the settlement the town paid $20,000 in the FFRF's attorneys fees. The town also agreed never to replace the missing arm and not to place other crosses on public property.

In August 2012, the FFRF, on behalf of a Montana resident, sued the United States Forest Service. A special use permit for the placement of a statue of Jesus on federal land was granted in 1954 at the request of the Knights of Columbus. The Forest Service continued to grant renewals of the permit until 2010. When the Service declined to renew, the Knights declined to remove the statue citing "tradition" and the "historical" value of the statue. After on-line protests the statue was allowed to stay and the permit granted. The FFRF filed suit in February 2012. In June 2013, a federal judge found in favor of the defendants, allowing the statue to remain. In August 2013, the FFRF filed an appeal of the decision. The Ninth Circuit Court of Appeals rejected FFRF's arguments and upheld the memorial.

In 2012, the FFRF wrote several letters to Prudhommes Restaurant, in Columbia, Pennsylvania, explaining that offering a 10% discount to Sunday patrons who present a church bulletin is a violation of state and federal law, specifically the Civil Rights Act of 1964. The individual who brought the matter to the FFRF's attention has filed a discrimination complaint with the Pennsylvania Human Relations Commission. The FFRF was only involved in an advisory capacity. The Pennsylvania Human Relations Commission entered a final order allowing the restaurant to continue the church bulletin discount.

A lighted cross in a public park in Honesdale, Pennsylvania, was removed by the borough in 2018 after complaints from FFRF. Not far from the park a solar-powered 28-foot cross was erected by a local resident on his own property.

==== Prayer in government/schools ====
In October 2008, the FFRF filed suit against the U.S. government over the statute establishing the National Day of Prayer (NDoP). In 2010, Federal judge Barbara Brandriff Crabb ruled it unconstitutional as it is "an inherently religious exercise that serves no secular function". This ruling was appealed by the U.S. government. In April 2011, the U.S. Seventh Circuit Court of Appeals dismissed the FFRF's challenge to the NDoP, holding that the FFRF did not have standing to challenge the NDoP statute or proclamations and that only the President was injured enough to challenge the NDoP statute.

The FFRF, in January 2013, after receiving a complaint from a resident, asked the city council of Rapid City, South Dakota, to eliminate its practice of beginning each city council meeting with a Christian prayer. After the FFRF sent a second letter in February 2013, the mayor stated at that time that prayers would continue.

Joseph Richardson, of Lake County, Florida, delivered a secular invocation on behalf of "non-religious citizens" at a county commission meeting on Tuesday, December 6, 2022. Following the invocation the director of Lake County Public Works Fred Schneider took the microphone and delivered a prayer at the request of the Lake County Commissioner Sean Parks. Christopher Line, an FFRF attorney, wrote a letter to the Lake County Commission Chairman Kirby Smith stating, "This Christian prayer, delivered because the invocation Mr. Richardson gave was not sufficiently Christian, was discriminatory, unconstitutional, and a slap in the face to all of Lake County's non-Christian citizens. [...] as long as the board continues to allow citizens to deliver invocations to begin its meetings, it must treat all invocations the same, with no ‘corrective’ Christian prayer offered after a non-Christian prayer has finished." Sean Parks stated that he was, "saddened to hear that Mr. Richardson felt he was mistreated during the invocation" and "We would welcome them [the Central FL Freethought Community] back if they wish to lead the invocation in the future."

In 2022, while Samuel Felinton, a Jew, was a high school junior, he was forced to attend a Christian revival while attending Huntington High School. He was obliged to stay and watch the assembly despite attempting to leave. This assembly would later make international news, by causing a multi-day walkout alongside Max Nibert and himself, including hundreds of their peers. In 2023, Felinton, alongside other parents, students, and the Freedom from Religion Foundation, settled a lawsuit against the Cabell County Board of Education to implement a ban on teacher-run religious events being held within school hours on campus.

=== Internal Revenue Service ===
==== Parish exemption ====
The FFRF filed suit against the IRS over the parish exemption that allows "ministers of the gospel" to claim part of their salary as an income-tax-free housing allowance. This was originally filed in 2009, in California, then subsequently dropped and re-filed in 2011, in Wisconsin, because of standing. In August 2012, a federal judge stated that the suit could go forward. In August 2013, the Justice Department argued that leaders of an atheist group may qualify for the parish exemption. Gaylor states "this is not what we are after", going on to say that the government should not give religious groups any special treatment.

On November 21, 2013, a federal judge ruled in the FFRF's favor. In January 2014, the Department of Justice filed an appeal in federal court. In November 2014, the U.S. Court of Appeals for the Seventh Circuit issued its decision, concluding that the federal tax code provision that treats church-provided housing allowances to ministers as income tax-free must stand.

==== Electioneering ====
In November 2012, the FFRF filed a lawsuit against the IRS for not enforcing its own electioneering laws. The FFRF cited in its suit the placement of full-page ads by the Billy Graham Evangelistic Association; the diocese requiring priests to read a statement urging Catholics to vote; and the institution of "Pulpit Freedom Sunday". The group claimed that not enforcing the federal tax codes that prohibit tax-exempt religious organizations from electioneering is a violation of the First Amendment of the Constitution. The group stated that the increasing involvement of religious institutions in politics was "blatantly and deliberately flaunting the electioneering restrictions". The IRS had filed a motion to dismiss in federal court, but in August 2013 it was decided that the lawsuit could proceed stating that the FFRF "has standing to seek an order requiring the IRS to treat religious organizations no more favorably than it treats the Foundation". In 2014, the federal judge dismissed the lawsuit after the parties reached an agreement.

== State capitol signs ==
=== Florida ===
In December 2013, the FFRF was permitted to hang a banner at the capitol after a nativity scene was placed by a private group.

=== Illinois ===
On December 23, 2009, William J. Kelly, conservative activist and candidate for Illinois Comptroller, attempted to remove a FFRF sign at a Christmas display. Kelly subsequently filed a lawsuit. The case was dismissed on several grounds, including that the lawsuit ran afoul of the First Amendment prohibition against content-based discrimination and that the plaintiff's rights had not been violated.

=== Washington ===
A plaque with the same text as the Wisconsin State Capitol sign was displayed for the 2008 Christmas season at the state capitol in Olympia, Washington, next to a nativity scene. The sign was stolen and then later found and returned to the state capitol. The addition of the sign incited a large number of individuals and groups to request other additions, such as a Festivus pole, a request by the Westboro Baptist Church for a sign stating "Santa Claus will take you to hell" (among other things), a sign paying homage to the Flying Spaghetti Monster, and many others.

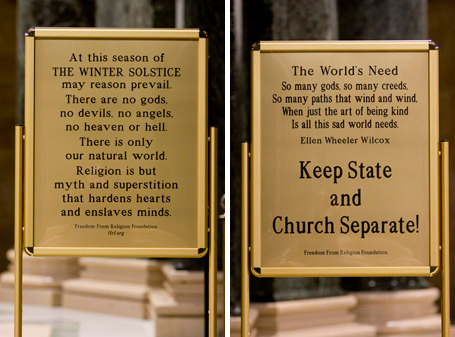
Front (left) and back (right) of sign displayed at the Wisconsin State Capitol. The sign in Washington displays the same message.

=== Wisconsin ===
The FFRF maintains a sign in the Wisconsin State Capitol during the Christmas season, which reads:

At this season of THE WINTER SOLSTICE may reason prevail.

There are no gods, no devils, no angels, no heaven or hell.
There is only our natural world.

Religion is but myth and superstition that hardens hearts and enslaves minds.

In 2013, a natural nativity featuring Charles Darwin, Albert Einstein and Mark Twain as the three wise men, the Statue of Liberty and an astronaut as angels and an African American girl baby doll to represent that "humankind was birthed in Africa" was added.

=== Texas State Capitol ===
In 2015, the FFRF applied to put a "secular Nativity" scene in the Texas State Capitol. The scene featured the Bill of Rights, three Founding Fathers, and the Statue of Liberty and a sign that wished everyone a "Happy Winter Solstice". The then governor of Texas, Greg Abbott, demanded it be removed. Following a series of legal challenges, in 2018, a three-judge panel of the Fifth Circuit Court of Appeals ruled that FFRF's rights were violated. The Court also vacated the ruling of the trial court and sent the case back for consideration of FFRF's request for an injunction.

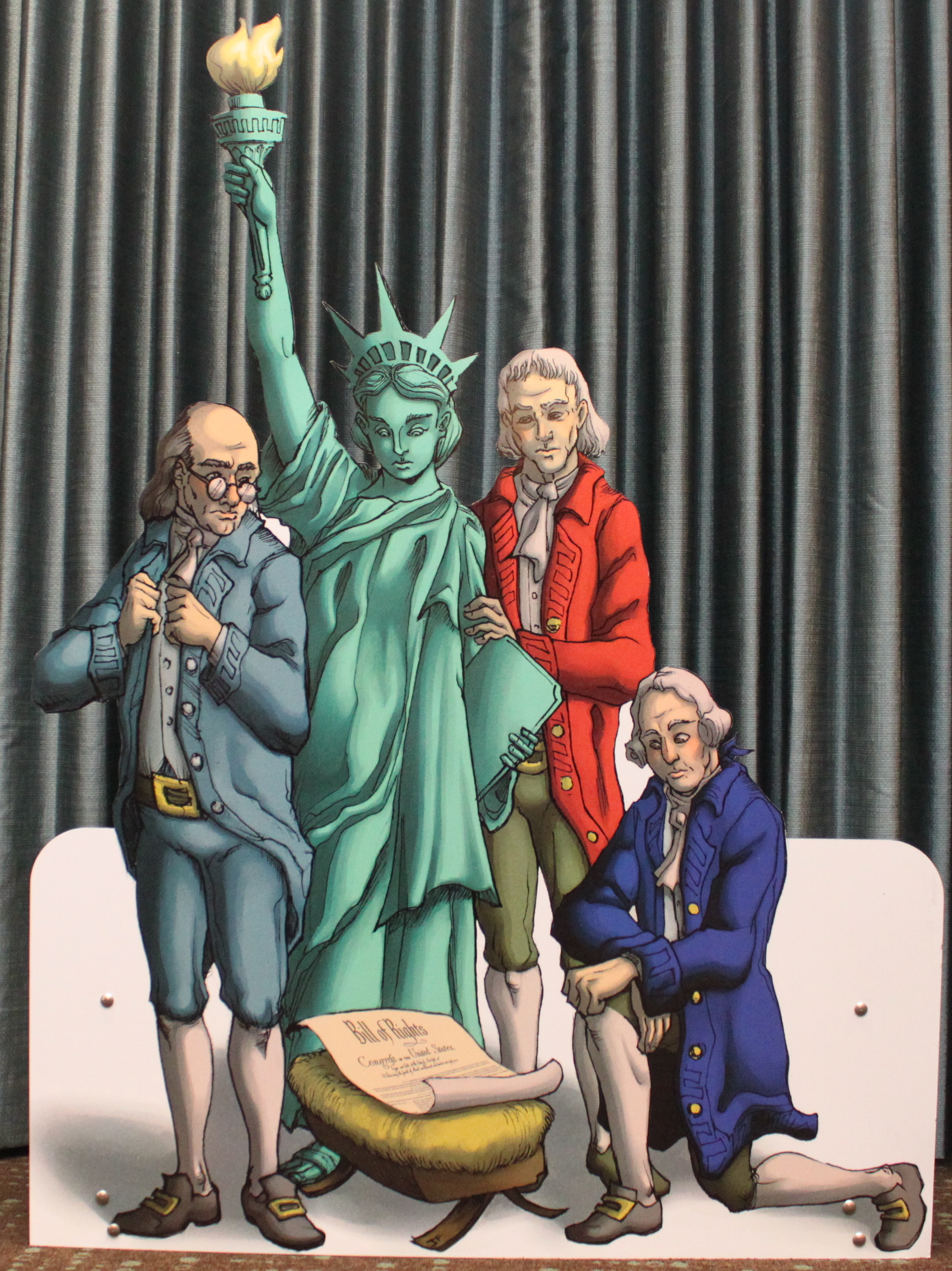
FFRF's Bill of Rights Nativity

=== Rhode Island ===
In 2013, the FFRF was allowed to place a sign in the rotunda, after complaints from its members, as a response to the crèches and other religious symbols that are already in place at the statehouse.

=== Dayton, Tennessee ===
On July 14, 2017, a statue of Clarence Darrow was unveiled in Dayton, Tennessee, on the Rhea County Courthouse lawn, funded by a $150,000 donation from the FFRF. The courthouse was the site of the historic 1925 Scopes Monkey Trial wherein Darrow unsuccessfully defended a teacher, John T. Scopes, who was found guilty of teaching evolution in a public school in violation of what was then a Tennessee state law. The statue was placed just a few feet away from a statue of William Jennings Bryan, Darrow's creationist opponent in the trial, which had been erected in 2005 by nearby Bryan College.

=== Athens, Texas ===
In 2011, the FFRF filed a letter of complaint regarding the placement of a nativity scene on Henderson County courthouse property. After it was decided that the nativity scene would remain, the FFRF petitioned to have its own banner placed on the site, but county officials declined to discuss its placement. The FFRF banner was placed without permission on the courthouse property, but was soon removed. The banner stated: "At this season of the winter solstice, let reason prevail. There are no Gods, no devils, no angels, no Heaven or Hell. There is only our natural world. Religion is but a myth and superstition that hardens hearts and enslaves minds". In April 2012, the county judge denied FFRF's request to place the same banner on the courthouse property.

== Events and activities ==
FFRF has held conventions since 1977, one year after the group formed and one year prior to its official incorporation. Conventions have included speakers such as Christopher Hitchens, awards presented to recognize contributions to the advancement of the freethought community, FFRF held NonPrayer Breakfasts, with what it described as moments of bedlam instead of moments of silence, and piano music by FFRF co-president Dan Barker.

The Emperor Has No Clothes Award has been awarded by FFRF since 1999 in recognition of what it called "plain speaking" on the shortcomings of religion by public figures. Past recipients include:

Year	Recipient(s)
1999	Steven Weinberg
2001	Jesse Ventura; Ted Turner; Andy Rooney; Janeane Garofalo; George Carlin; Richard Dawkins; Katha Pollitt
2002	Robert Sapolsky; Steve Benson
2003	Penn & Teller; Roger, Pat and Melody Cleveland; Natalie Angier
2004	Steven Pinker; Ron Reagan; Peter Singer; Robyn Blumner; Anne Nicol Gaylor
2005	Oliver Sacks
2006	Julia Sweeney
2007	Christopher Hitchens
2008	Daniel C. Dennett
2009	Ron Reagan; Ursula K. Le Guin; William Lobdell
2010	Cenk Uygur; Ayaan Hirsi Ali
2011	Jerry Coyne; Charles Strouse
2012	Richard Dawkins
2013	Dan Savage; Juan Mendez
2014	Bart D. Ehrman; Sean M. Carroll; Donald Johanson
2015	Ernie Chambers; Taslima Nasrin
2016	Lawrence Krauss
2018	Paula Poundstone; Jared Huffman; Salman Rushdie; Adam Savage
2019	Trae Crowder; Anthony B. Pinn
2021	Ann Druyan
2022	John Irving
2023	Lizz Winstead
2024	Charles M. Blow
2025	Mary L. Trump

== See also ==
- Irreligion
  - Anti-clericalism
  - Antireligion
  - Antitheism
  - Atheist feminism
  - Irreligion in the United States
  - Recovering from Religion
- Concepts
  - Ceremonial deism
  - Religious discrimination
- Separation of church and state in the United States
  - Americans United for Separation of Church and State
  - Christian Clergy Members in American Politics
  - Church tax
  - In God We Trust
- Criticism of religion
  - Forced conversion
  - Freedom of thought
- Organizations
  - American Atheists
  - Freethought Association of Canada
