= Ashley Iaconetti =

American television personality (born 1988)

Ashley Iaconetti Haibon
- Born: Ashley Nicole Iaconetti; March 6, 1988 (age 38); New Jersey, US
- Education: James Madison University (BA); Syracuse University (MA)
- Occupation: Television Personality
- Known for: Appearances in The Bachelor; Bachelor in Paradise; The Bachelor Winter Games; The Real Housewives of Rhode Island
- Spouse: Jared Haibon (m. 2019)
- Children: 2

Ashley Nicole Iaconetti Haibon (born March 6, 1988) is an American reality television personality notable for being a contestant on several series in The Bachelor television franchise, including The Bachelor, Bachelor in Paradise and The Bachelor Winter Games, along with her starring role on The Real Housewives of Rhode Island.

== Early life ==
Ashley Nicole Iaconetti was born on March 6, 1988, in New Jersey and raised in Great Falls, Virginia. Her parents are Dr. Jay Iaconetti and Audrey Iaconetti (née Zylstra), natives of Bergen County, New Jersey. She is of Italian ancestry on her father's side and of Dutch and Lithuanian ancestry from her mother's side. She has a sister two years younger, Lauren Iaconetti. Iaconetti lived in Dedham, Massachusetts from ages two to five years old.

Iaconetti attended Langley High School in Langley, Virginia, and earned her bachelor's degree in Media Arts and Design from James Madison University in Harrisonburg, Virginia. She later earned a master's degree in Broadcast Journalism from Syracuse University in Syracuse, New York.

== Career ==
=== Media career ===
While at Syracuse, Iaconetti she interned at the local ABC affiliate, NewsChannel 9 WSYR. Post-Bachelor, she was a correspondent for Access Hollywood and ClevverTV, and a contributor for Cosmopolitan.

Iaconetti was the host of the YouTube show The Story of Us for KineticTV, which showcased real love stories. Iaconetti and her husband Jared Haibon's love story, and first long-form interview post-engagement, was featured on the episode finale which garnered 3 million views.

Iaconetti co-hosts the iHeartRadio podcast The Ben and Ashley I Almost Famous Podcast with former Bachelor Ben Higgins and co-hosts the I Don't Get It podcast with her sister Lauren Iaconetti and former Bachelor producer Naz Perez.

=== Reality television career ===
In 2013, while studying at Syracuse, a then 25-year old Iaconetti utilized filming equipment to create a comedic audition tape for The Bachelor, in which she acted out mock dates and scenes as if she were on the show.

In January 2015, Iaconetti appeared in season 19 of The Bachelor. She was nicknamed “Ashley I” to differentiate her from another contestant of the same name. Iaconneti became notorious for her expressive emotional personality and sharing her status as a virgin. She was eliminated half-way through the season on episode 6. She remained close friends with majority of the cast

In August 2015, Iaconetti appeared in the second season of Bachelor in Paradise, joined by her sister Lauren. She briefly dated and split from Jared Haibon in week 5. In 2016, she returned for the third season and left in week 6.

In 2018, Iaconetti appeared in the first season of The Bachelor Winter Games. Iaconetti and Kevin Wendt became the first winners of the Bachelor Winter Games. They became a couple on the show, and split a couple months later.

In 2026, Iaconetti joined the cast of The Real Housewives of Rhode Island, which premiered on April 2, 2026. Iaconetti showcased her life adapting to living in her husband's home state, balancing motherhood and their careers as influencers and small business owners.

The show was Bravo’s biggest multiplatform series premiere since 2024 with 2.7M viewers, and was Peacock's most-watched series or season premiere of all time for a Bravo original on Peacock in its first week. In May 2026 the show was renewed for its second season after just 7 episodes, following its record breaking premiere.

=== Business ventures ===
In 2021, Iaconetti and her husband Jared Haibon, opened Audrey’s Coffee House and Lounge in South Kingstown, Rhode Island. They named the establishment after Iaconetti's mother, Audrey.

== Personal life ==
In December 2017, Iaconetti began dating Kevin Wendt, her partner with whom she won The Bachelor Winter Games. They split in early 2018.

In April 2018, Iaconetti began dating Bachelor castmate Jared Haibon. Haibon and Iaconetti met in 2015 on season 2 of Bachelor in Paradise in Sayulita, Mexico, where they briefly dated. They both came back on season 3 in 2016. Post-filming, they developed a close friendship. After becoming an official couple, they made an appearance on season 5, where Haibon proposed on June 17, 2018 at the beach where they met.

Iaconetti and Haibon were married on August 11, 2019 at the historic Rosecliff Mansion in Newport, Rhode Island. Their wedding was attended by various Bachelor cast members, and the nuptials were ordained by longtime friend and Bachelor producer, Elan Gale.

In March 2021, the couple moved from Los Angeles to Haibon's native Rhode Island. They welcomed their sons Dawson Demitri Haibon on January 31, 2022, and Hayden Cruise Haibon on July 22, 2024. Iaconetti chose to give birth the at the hospital her father works in her home state of Virginia. Iaconetti and Haibon reside in Rhode Island.

== Filmography ==
=== Television ===
Year	Title	Notes
2015, 2017, 2019–2021	The Bachelor	Contestant (Season 19); Guest (subsequent seasons)
2015–2016	After Paradise	4 episodes
2015–2018, 2022	Bachelor in Paradise	Contestant, Guest
2015–2019	Entertainment Tonight	6 episodes
2015, 2020	The Bachelorette	Guest; 2 episodes
2016	The Bachelor at 20: A Celebration of Love	Television special
2016	Celebrity Family Feud	Episode: "Bachelors vs. Bachelorettes/Indy Car Drivers vs. Sports Illustrated Models"
2016	Million Dollar Matchmaker	Episode: "The Crying Virgin and the Gullible"
2016	The Ellen DeGeneres Show	Episode: "Ellen's Season 14 Premiere Week: Day 2"
2016	The Bachelorette Canada After Show	Episode #1.5
2017	Watch Party: The Bachelor	1 episode
2017	Access Hollywood	Episode #21.248
2017	Access Daily	11 episodes
2017–2020	Celebrity Page	84 episodes
2018	Movie Trivia Schmoedown	Episode: "2017 Movie Trivia Schmoedown Awards"
2018	Extra	Episode #24.146
2018	The Bachelor Winter Games	Contestant; 5 episodes
2018, 2019	Collider Live	2 episodes
2019	GMA3: What You Need To Know	Episode #2.8
2019	Ex on the Beach	Episode: "Reunion"
2019	What's Up Orange County	Episode: "Mario Lopez, Eric Winter, Roselyn Sanchez"
2019–2021	Home & Family	3 episodes
2020	Game Night with the Hamiltons	Episode: "Very Scary Halloween Edition"
2023	Stars on Mars	2 episodes
2026–present	The Real Housewives of Rhode Island	Main cast
