= Alicia Carmody =

American television personality

- Born: Alicia Carmody; November 25, 1984 (age 41); Cranston, Rhode Island, U.S.
- Occupations: Television personality; entrepreneur
- Known for: The Real Housewives of Rhode Island
- Partner: Bill Kitsilis (2012–present)
- Children: 1

Alicia Carmody (born November 25, 1984) is an American television personality known for appearing on the Bravo reality television series The Real Housewives of Rhode Island.

== Early life ==
Alicia Carmody was born on November 25, 1984, in Cranston, Rhode Island, the only child of Thomas J. Carmody and Anita Cicerone. She is of Irish descent from her father's side and Italian descent from her mother's side. She was raised Catholic. Carmody's father left the family when she was in elementary school. He sold the family home and took the family's savings, displacing Carmody and her mother.

Carmody and her mother were taken in by her maternal grandparents, Nicandro Cicerone and Isabella DePalma, and moved in their home's basement. Her grandparents were owners of Superior Bakery in Cranston, Rhode Island, a community staple run by her family for 40 years. Growing up, Carmody did not have a relationship with her father, which she has shared caused her abandonment trauma. Carmody was raised by her mother's large matriarchal family, which included her five aunts Marie, Deborah, Sharon, Judy and Gina.

Carmody attended Cranston High School West and graduated in 2002. From a young age she developed a passion for fashion and beauty, which led her to enroll in the Paul Mitchell Beauty School, where she earned a Cosmetology License.

== Personal life and career ==
Carmody met Rhode Island restaurateur and lawyer Bill Kitsilis in 2012. Kitsilis comes from a large Greek-American family, with whom he built an expansive restaurant business across Rhode Island and Massachusetts. In 2016, Kitsilis proposed to Carmody while she was pregnant with their child. Their daughter Celina was born on March 21, 2017. The couple has yet to be married and remain engaged. The family resides in Providence, Rhode Island.

Carmody began her cosmetology career as a hair and makeup artist at Moss Salon, where she worked for 20 years. During this time, Carmody also began working with her fiancé Bill Kitsilis on his restaurant business, helping develop the brand for Pizza Mamma, an Italian-American pizzeria in Cranston.

In 2025, Carmody joined the cast of The Real Housewives of Rhode Island, which premiered on April 2, 2026. Carmody grew up with fellow RHORI cast members Liz McGraw, Jo-Ellen Tiberi and her husband Gary Tiberi in Cranston. Carmody is an avid doll collector, and featured her collection on the show.

== Filmography ==
Year	Title	Role	Notes
2026–present	The Real Housewives of Rhode Island	Herself	Main cast
