= Jessica Ahlquist =

American atheist activist and public speaker

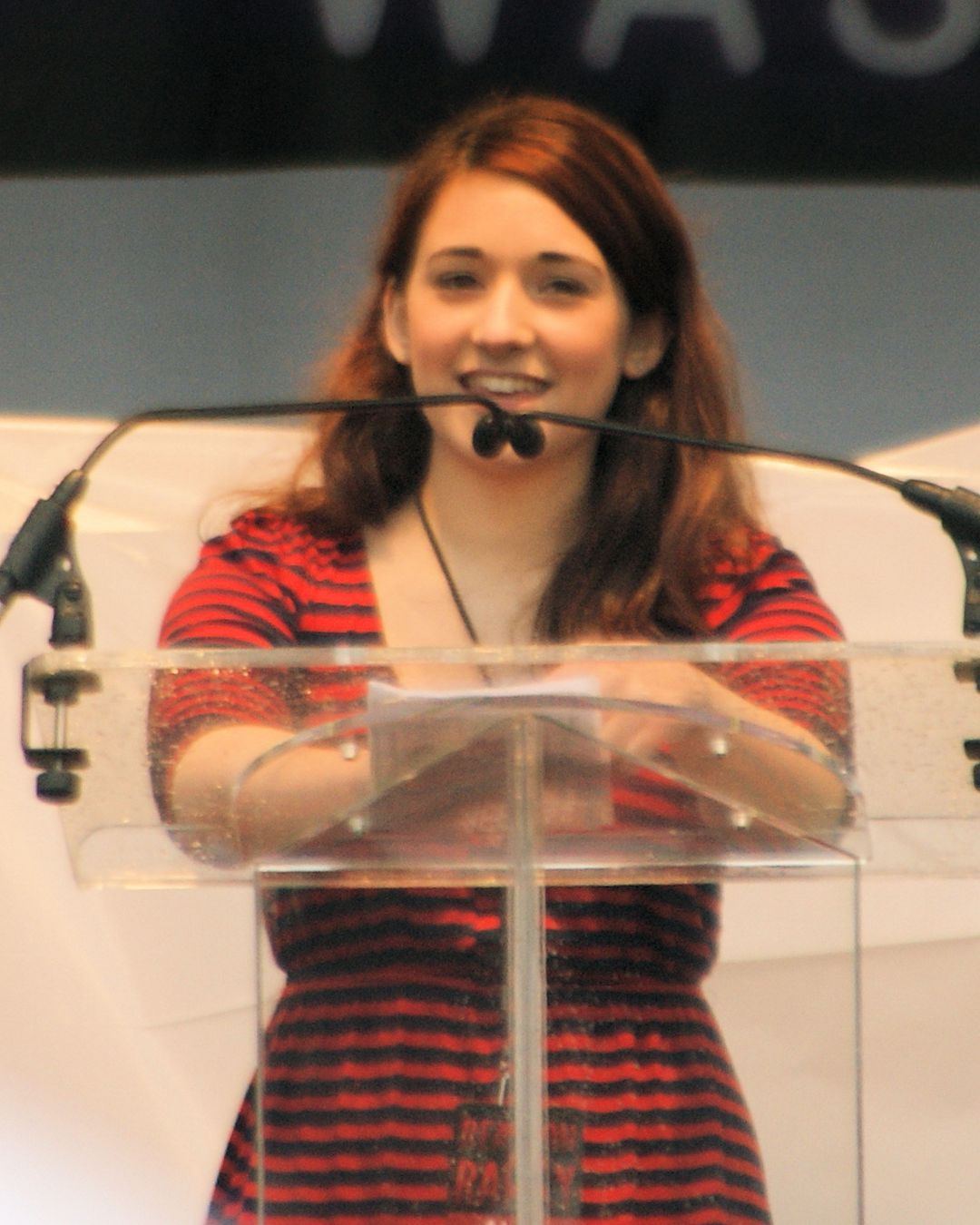
- Ahlquist in 2012
- Born: June 21, 1995 (age 31)

Jessica Ahlquist (born June 21, 1995) is an American activist and public speaker who filed a lawsuit in 2012 against Cranston High School West, where she was a student, to remove a religious prayer from its auditorium. The suit, Ahlquist v. Cranston, was filed with the assistance of the American Civil Liberties Union, and was ultimately decided in Ahlquist's favor. During the lawsuit, Ahlquist received hate mail and was verbally attacked by her peers, media outlets, and online. She received death threats, and required police escorts to and from classes.

On January 12, 2011, the day following the ruling, Rhode Island State Representative Peter G. Palumbo spoke on a local radio show and referred to Ahlquist as "an evil little thing".

Since the lawsuit, Ahlquist has received a variety of media attention, and she has been an invited speaker at a number of events, including the Reason Rally, the Texas Freethought Convention and Skepticon 5.

Two high-school students from other states have described their objections to school prayer as inspired by her activism. She has received a number of awards, including the 2011 Thomas Jefferson Youth Activist and the American Humanist Association's 2012 Humanist Pioneer Award.

== Early life ==
Jessica Ahlquist was born on June 21, 1995. She grew up in Cranston, Rhode Island. She is the oldest of four children and the daughter of a firefighter and nurse. Ahlquist's family was religious, and she had been raised as a Catholic, but after her mother fell ill, she began to identify as an atheist. She describes herself as "a nerd" who loves Harry Potter and Facebook. When asked if the court case inspired her to get into law, she responded that law might be her future.

== Lawsuit ==
In July 2010, the American Civil Liberties Union (ACLU) sent a letter to the school superintendent on behalf of an unnamed parent who complained about a banner at the school which contained a "school prayer." After reading about the complaint, Ahlquist decided to sit in on the school board meetings. She also created a Facebook page to raise support for the cause. At an August 2010 meeting of the Cranston School Committee, a subcommittee was asked to make recommendations about the disposition of the banner; Ahlquist attended the public meetings of the subcommittee in November 2010 and February 2011. At the end of the November meeting, out of safety concerns, a police escort was provided for Ahlquist and one other person who spoke in favor of the banner's removal. At a contentious meeting of the full committee, she argued the case for the removal of the banner and a similar display at Bain Middle School. The committee voted 4–3 in favor of keeping the banner in place, despite a budget deficit and the threat of an ACLU lawsuit.

A lawsuit was filed in April 2011, with Ahlquist as the plaintiff. The Cranston School Committee had made defense arrangements with Joseph V. Cavanagh Jr. and The Becket Fund for Religious Liberty which represented them without charge.

In the January 11, 2012, Ahlquist v. Cranston ruling, District Court Judge Ronald R. Lagueux of the United States District Court for the District of Rhode Island ruled that a "School Prayer" banner posted in Cranston High School West was a violation of the Establishment Clause of the United States Constitution, in part based on the United States Supreme Court's earlier rulings in Lemon v. Kurtzman (1971), Lynch v. Donnelly (1984), and Lee v. Weisman (1992), and ordered its removal.

On February 16, 2012, the Cranston School Committee decided not to appeal by a 5–2 vote. The banner was removed, intact, during the first weekend in March, and the school and city agreed to pay the ACLU $150,000 in legal fees.

=== Threats ===
During the lawsuit, Ahlquist received hatemail and was verbally attacked by her peers, media outlets, and online. She received death threats, and required police escorts to and from classes. An unnamed student was disciplined by the school because of threats.

The Freedom from Religion Foundation ordered flowers to be delivered to Ahlquist during the trial, but two local florists refused delivery. The group has filed a complaint with Rhode Island Commission for Human Rights and given Ahlquist $13,000 from support and scholarship funds.

On the day following the ruling, Rhode Island State Representative Peter G. Palumbo spoke on a local radio show and referred to Ahlquist as "an evil little thing". In response, her supporters began selling T-shirts with the words "Evil little thing" on the front. They committed the proceeds to a college education fund established for her. The fund raised over $62,000 which was presented to her at the Reason Rally on March 24, 2012, where she was an invited speaker. Ahlquist was also awarded the Humanist Pioneer Award from the American Humanist Association. In 2013, she received a Hugh M. Hefner First Amendment Award in the education category. Religious leaders from the Rhode Island State Council of Churches rallied to defend Ahlquist and condemn the language used to describe her.

== After the lawsuit ==
Several months after the case was closed, in April 2012, Ahlquist received threatening letters in the mail from individuals describing themselves as "crusaders". Police were still investigating as of 2012.

Ahlquist was an invited speaker at a number of events in 2012, spanning at least five US states and international media. She speaks at approximately one venue each month, including the Reason Rally on the National Mall in Washington, D.C., on March 24, 2012, the largest gathering of atheists in history, alongside Richard Dawkins, Adam Savage, Eddie Izzard, Paul Provenza, PZ Myers, Dan Barker and James Randi. There, she was introduced as the Joan of Arc of secularism, and presented a check for the proceeds from her T-shirt sales. She also spoke at the Texas Freethought Convention in 2012. Ahlquist is a frequent and popular guest on Freethought RI, a weekly radio show produced by the RI Atheist Society. On June 25, 2011, she was a speaker at Center for Inquiry transnational in Amherst, New York and on February 6, 2012, in Mesa Arts Center, Mesa, Arizona, professor Richard Dawkins specifically discussed the threats Jessica Ahlquist had been receiving. On August 16, 2011, she finished first place among the 2011 Best High School Individual Activist Award Winners, organized by the Secular Student Alliance.

On February 21, 2012, Ahlquist was interviewed live on CNN about the Cranston case.

Ahlquist is currently a real estate agent based in Providence, Rhode Island.

== Awards and accolades ==
John Figdor of the Secular Student Alliance stated "she's a role model to so many young people". JT Eberhard of the same organisation called for nominating Ahlquist for the 2012 Presidential Citizens Medal.

On April 26, 2012, Ana Kasparian and John Iadarola discussed the hate mail at Ahlquist's address in TYTUniversity, a spin-off from The Young Turks.

=== Awards ===
- On October 8, 2011, the Freedom From Religion Foundation named her the 2011 Thomas Jefferson Youth Activist.
- On June 9, 2012, the American Humanist Association honored Ahlquist with the 2012 Humanist Pioneer Award, which was presented to her at the 71st annual American Humanist Association conference in New Orleans.
- On August 19, 2012, Ahlquist was given the Judge George Alexander Teitz Award, for "commitment to the ideals of religious and ethnic tolerance and freedom" by the Touro Synagogue Foundation in Newport, Rhode Island.
- On May 22, 2013, Ahlquist was honored with the Hugh M. Hefner First Amendment Award in the Education category.
