= Francis Renault =

American female impersonator

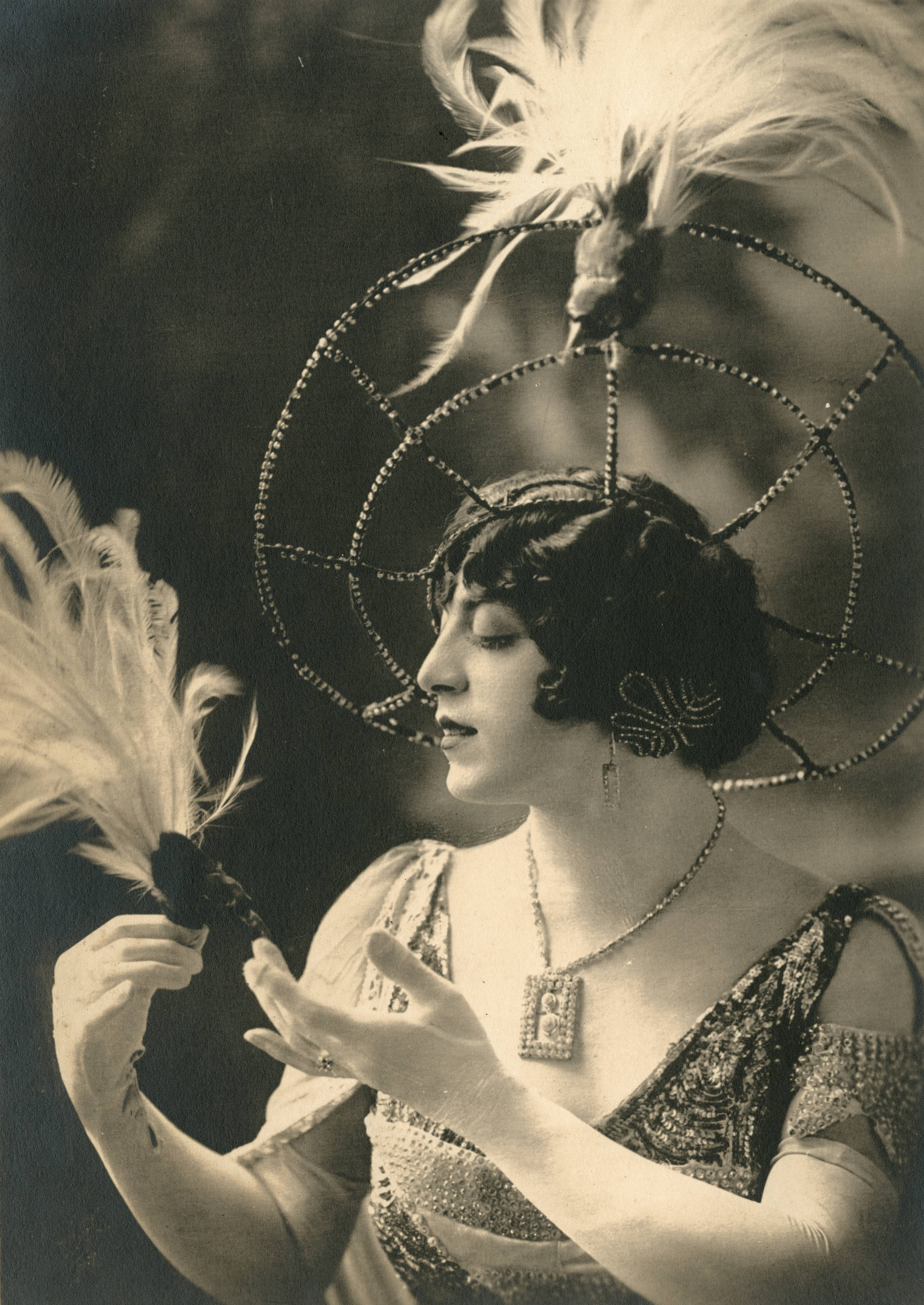
- Renault in 1907
- Born: Antonio Auriemma c. 1893; Providence, Rhode Island or Naples, Italy
- Died: May 29, 1955 (aged 61–62); New York City, New York, United States
- Occupations: Female impersonator, Vaudeville performer
- Years active: 1911 - 1950

Francis Renault (born Antonio Auriemma; c. 1893 – May 29, 1955, New York City), also known by the stage name Auriema, was a female impersonator and vaudeville performer who performed in the United States beginning in the 1910s.

== Biography ==
Renault was born Antonio Auriemma, and sources differ on whether he was born in Providence, Rhode Island, or Naples, Italy. If he was born abroad, it is unclear when he moved to the United States. At one point in his childhood he worked selling newspapers in the Eastern United States. After his talent as a singer was discovered, he began performing as a soprano singer. With the Gus Edwards' Company, he performed for Ida Saxton McKinley and FDR.

Renault first performed under the name Auriema in Providence, Rhode Island in 1911. He adopted the name of Francis Renault in the mid-1910s, as he gained popularity and began touring. During this time, he performed in Atlanta, San Francisco, and Utah. He primarily impersonated American singer and actress Lillian Russell. By the 1920s, Renault was being billed as the "world's greatest female impersonator".

In 1922, Renault shifted from vaudeville to musical revue performance. That year, he performed in The Passing Show of 1922 alongside Fred Allen, Ethel Shutta, and the Howard Brothers. In October of that year, he performed in Milady, a show by Otto Harbach and Herbert Stothart with a cast of twenty female impersonators.

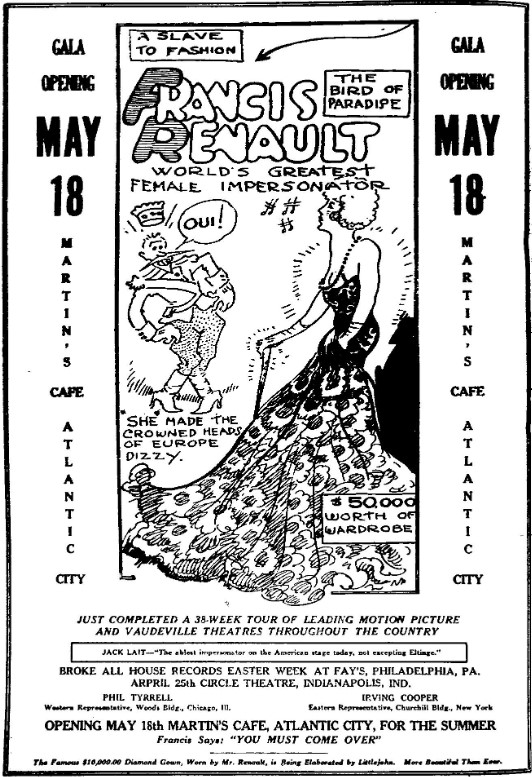
Advertisement for a 1926 performance by Renault in Atlantic City, New Jersey

In the 1920s, Renault performed in the United States in Atlanta, Georgia, Atlantic City, New Jersey, Dallas, Texas, and Indianapolis, Indiana, among other cities. In the mid 1920s, Irving Berlin Inc and Henry Waterson Inc began to add "featured by Francis Renault" on the covers of their sheet music for songs which Renault had performed.

In the 1930s, Renault put up a billboard of himself in Times Square.

In 1945, Renault performed at Carnegie Hall in New York City in September, October, and November, and again in April 1946.

== Fashion ==
Renault became well known for his fashion, being billed as "The Original Slave of Fashion" and "The Parisian Fashion Plate". At some performances, Renault's outfits were displayed in the theater's lobby, so audience members could view them up close. His outfits included a copy of Marie Antoinette's wedding dress.

Unlike some other female impersonators of the day, Renault often crossdressed in public, outside of performances. In 1913 he was arrested in Atlanta for wearing high heels, and unsuccessfully challenged the city's crossdressing ordinance. Renault was arrested again for crossdressing in Dallas in 1925.

== Personal life ==
In the early 1920s, Renault fought as a boxer.

He owned a nightclub and speakeasy in Atlantic City, New Jersey, called Club Francis Renault, beginning in 1926.
