= Rhode Island Pride =

Annual pride festival in Providence, Rhode Island

- Formation: Established 1976
- Type: LGBT Organization
- Location: 1055 Westminster St, Providence, RI 02903
- Website: https://www.prideri.org/

Rhode Island Pride is an LGBT organization that serves the Rhode Island LGBTQ community, most notably holding its annual PrideFest in June. The organization traces its roots to the 1976 march, in which 75 individuals protested the city's refusal of a permit to host an official march. Today, Rhode Island Pride is one of the largest and most active LGBTQ organizations in Rhode Island, hosting community events and offering resources to Rhode Island's LGBTQ population.

Rhode Island Pride's PrideFest is the organization's largest initiative, attracting more than a hundred thousand people to Providence, RI every June for festivities including a marketplace, a block party, and a parade, among other events. PrideFest's premiere event is its Illuminated Night Pride Parade, a pride parade held on the Saturday evening of PrideFest.

== History ==
In 1976, lesbian and gay Rhode Islanders organized their first pride march with about 75 people in attendance. Called the "76ers," these individuals marched through downtown Providence despite state and city leaders attempting to block the parade. However, organizers litigated for legal permission to march. This event marked an important step in formal organizing for LGBTQ rights in Rhode Island, establishing the foundation for the group that would become Rhode Island Pride. In the next four decades, participation grew annually from just under 100 in 1976 to over 60,000 at RI PrideFest in 2019. In RI, early gay pride celebrations were some of the first steps that eventually led to civil rights protections being extended to gay men, lesbians, and bisexuals in 1995, and to transgender individuals in 2001.

In the 1980s, the previous loosely organized, grassroots marches became more organized and yet less radical parades. Under pressure from conservative community members, the marches dropped "Liberation" and "Freedom" from their names, replacing them with the philosophy of "Gay Pride." However, the Greek lambda symbol and the pink triangle, which had been revolutionary symbols of the Gay Liberation Movement, were incorporated into the Gay Pride, or Pride, movement, providing some symbolic continuity with its more radical beginnings.

In 1997, the very first rainbow flag was flown over a government building in the state of RI. Soon after, in 2001, the Illuminated Night Parade that transformed the Pride celebration was launched.

== PrideFest ==
PrideFest is an annual LGBT pride celebration, coinciding with Pride Month. The current iteration consists of several events held during a designated weekend in mid-June. In 2019, the Saturday of PrideFest included the Hasbro Kids Zone, food trucks, and live entertainment during the day, followed by the Illuminated Night Pride Parade in the evening. The following Sunday featured a drag brunch.

The Illuminated Pride Parade is PrideFest's largest event, attracting over 100,000 attendees in 2019, exceeding the expectations of 60,000 attendees. After being introduced in 2001, the parade dramatically boosted the attendance and community involvement in PrideFest.

In 2018, PrideFest led to Providence being listed as one of the "World's Best Destinations for LGBT Pride Celebrations" by National Geographic.

== Organization ==
Rhode Island Pride is a 501(c)3 organization consisting of various committees, volunteers, and a board of directors. The organization hosts year-round events and programs for the Rhode Island community, including the Rhode Island Pride Honors Gala and the Rhode Island Pride Pageant.
