= Army and Navy YMCA =

- U.S. National Register of Historic Places
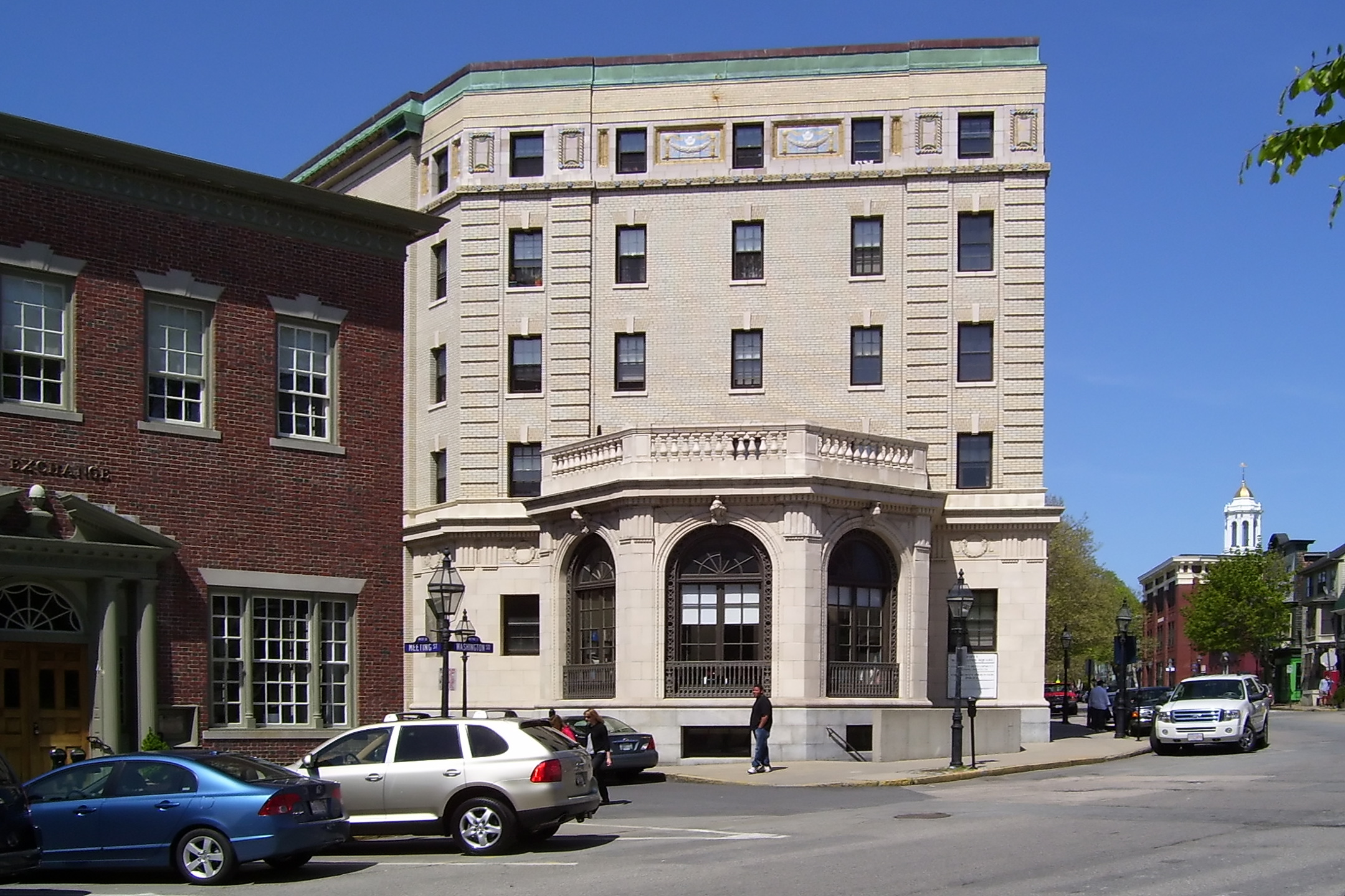

- Location within Rhode Island Location within the United States
- Location: Newport, Rhode Island
- Coordinates: 41°29′26″N 71°18′51″W
- Built: 1911
- Built by: Norcross Brothers
- Architect: Louis E. Jallade
- Architectural style: Beaux Arts
- NRHP reference No.: 88003073
- Added to NRHP: December 29, 1988

The Army and Navy YMCA is a historic YMCA building at 50 Washington Square in Newport, Rhode Island. It is a five-story concrete, masonry, and brick building, designed by Louis E. Jallade and erected in 1911 by the Norcross Brothers. It occupies a small, irregularly-shaped city block at the upper end of Washington Square, Newport's historic civic center. The building was constructed in a Beaux Arts style, with limestone finish predominating on the main facades, with some terra cotta paneling. Mrs. Thomas Emery, a philanthropist from Cincinnati, Ohio, funded its construction to provide services for Navy members when Newport was a major center of the United States Navy. YMCA closed after the Navy significantly reduced its presence in Newport in 1973. The building now serves as low income (section 8) housing.

The building was listed on the National Register of Historic Places in 1988. Although it is within the boundaries of the Newport Historic District, a National Historic Landmark, it does not contribute to its significance, which has a cutoff date of 1820.

== See also ==
- List of YMCA buildings
- San Diego Armed Services YMCA
- National Register of Historic Places listings in Newport County, Rhode Island
