= Ahlquist v. Cranston =

2012 US District Court case

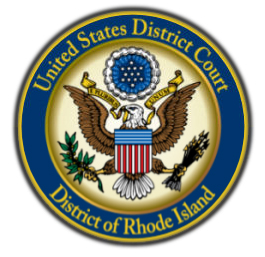
- Court: United States District Court for the District of Rhode Island
- Full case name: Mark Ahlquist, as next friend, parent, and guardian of Jessica Ahlquist v. City of Cranston and School Committee of the City of Cranston
- Decided: January 11, 2012
- Docket nos.: 1:11-cv-00138
- Citation: 840 F. Supp. 2d 507

Case history
- Subsequent action: Motion for reconsideration denied (April 12, 2012)

Holding
- The "School Prayer" banner violates the Establishment Clause

Court membership
- Judge sitting: Ronald R. Lagueux

Ahlquist v. Cranston, 840 F. Supp. 2d 507 (D.R.I. 2012), was a case where the United States District Court for the District of Rhode Island ruled that a "School Prayer" banner posted in Cranston High School West was a violation of the Establishment Clause of the United States Constitution and ordered its removal. The suit was brought by Mark Ahlquist on behalf of his minor daughter Jessica Ahlquist, a student at the school, with the assistance of the American Civil Liberties Union.

== Banner ==
When Cranston High School West was opened in 1959, its student council was charged with selection of a school prayer along with its school creed, colors, and mascot. The prayer, adopted in 1960, replaced the Lord's Prayer in daily recitation until 1962, following the United States Supreme Court ruling in Engel v. Vitale. Banners bearing both the school creed and prayer were gifts from the school's first graduating class (1963), and were affixed in the school auditorium. The text of the prayer reads:

Our Heavenly Father.

Grant us each day the desire to do our best.
To grow mentally and morally as well as physically.
To be kind and helpful to our classmates and teachers.
To be honest with ourselves as well as with others.
Help us to be good sports and smile when we lose as well as when we win.
Teach us the value of true friendship.
Help us always to conduct ourselves so as to bring credit to Cranston High School West.

Amen.

— School Prayer, Cranston High School West

== Plaintiffs ==
Jessica Ahlquist was born in 1995, and lives in Cranston, Rhode Island. Her father, Mark Ahlquist, was co-plaintiff as parent, guardian, and next friend.

== Lawsuit ==
In July 2010, the American Civil Liberties Union (ACLU) sent a letter to Cranston School District superintendent on behalf of an unnamed parent who complained about the banner. Initially, school officials thought the banner could be modified, avoiding the prohibitive expense of a lawsuit. Ahlquist had noticed the banner in her first year in high school. After reading about the complaint, she decided to sit in on the school board meetings. She also created a Facebook page to raise support for the cause. At an August 2010 meeting of the Cranston School Committee, a subcommittee was asked to make recommendations about the disposition of the banner; Ahlquist attended the public meetings of the subcommittee in November 2010 and February 2011. At the end of the November meeting, out of safety concerns, a police escort was provided for Ahlquist and one other person who spoke in favor of the banner's removal. At a contentious meeting of the full committee, she argued the case for the removal of the banner and a similar display at Bain Middle School. The committee voted 4–3 in favor of keeping the banner in place, despite a budget deficit and the threat of an ACLU lawsuit.

The Rhode Island chapter of the ACLU asked Ahlquist if she would serve as a plaintiff in a lawsuit. The suit was filed in April 2011. The Cranston School Committee had made defense arrangements with Joseph V. Cavanagh, Jr. and The Becket Fund for Religious Liberty which represented them without charge.

District Court Judge Ronald R. Lagueux issued a decision in favor of Ahlquist on January 11, 2012. The decision was in part based on the Establishment Clause of the First Amendment, and the United States Supreme Court's earlier rulings in Lemon v. Kurtzman (1971), Lynch v. Donnelly (1984), and Lee v. Weisman (1992), all three of which had a local Rhode Island component: the Lee case was from nearby Providence, the Lynch case was from Pawtucket bordering Providence on the opposite side from Cranston, and the Lemon case was consolidated at the appeals level from both Rhode Island and Pennsylvania.

== Aftermath ==
At the hearing, Lagueux remarked that Ahlquist "is clearly an articulate and courageous young woman, who took a brave stand, particularly in light of the hostile response she has received from her community". Following the ruling on the case, police involvement has increased, both escorting Ahlquist to classes and investigating threats, mostly originating in Cranston. An unnamed student was disciplined by the school because of threats. Local florists also refused a delivery to Ahlquist. Two high school students from other states have described their objections to school prayer as inspired by her activism.

Religious leaders from the Rhode Island State Council of Churches rallied to defend Ahlquist and condemn the language used to describe her. The organization's executive minister, Rev. Dr. Donald Anderson attended Cranston West when the banner went up; he supported Lagueux's decision.

On the day following the ruling, Rhode Island State Representative Peter G. Palumbo spoke on a local radio show and referred to Ahlquist as "an evil little thing". While the supporters of the banner raised funds for the preservation of the banner in the event of its ordered removal by selling T-shirts with the banner's full text, Ahlquist's supporters raised funds with "Evil little thing" T-shirts, the proceeds going to a college education fund established for her.

On February 16, 2012, the Cranston School Committee decided not to appeal by a 5–2 vote. The banner was removed, intact, during the first weekend in March, and the school and city agreed to pay the ACLU $150,000 in legal fees. On the day of the agreement, a group consisting of three students, three alumni, and a North Providence resident filed a motion to stay. The motion was dismissed on the basis of being untimely and that they lacked standing. The group filed a notice of appeal over the ruling barring their intervention. Of the seven appellants, as of October 2012 four had not signed the notice of appeal, and mail sent by the First Circuit Court of Appeals to a fifth appellant's address was returned as undeliverable with no forwarding address. While various parties remained interested in acquiring the banner a year after the case had been decided, the banner remained in storage. In September 2013, an alumni group presented a new mural to the school containing the school's creed.
