= Godless Americans March on Washington =

Fall 2002 Washington, DC event

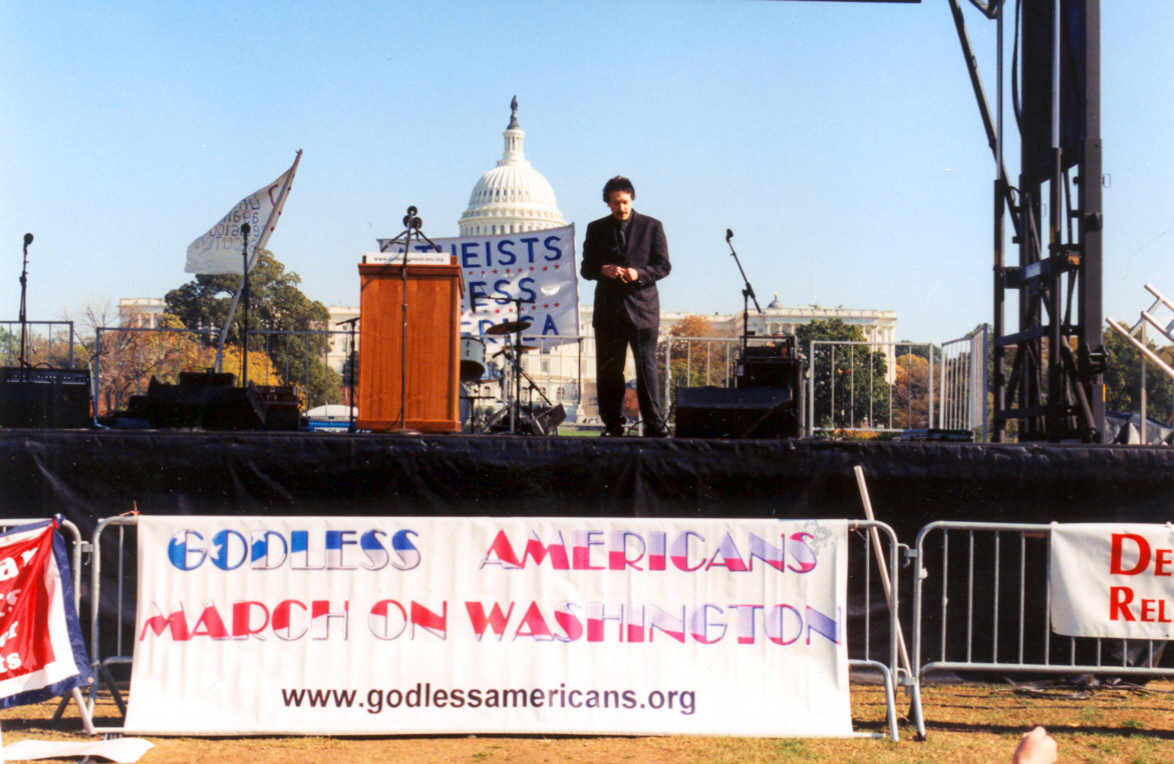
Event stage

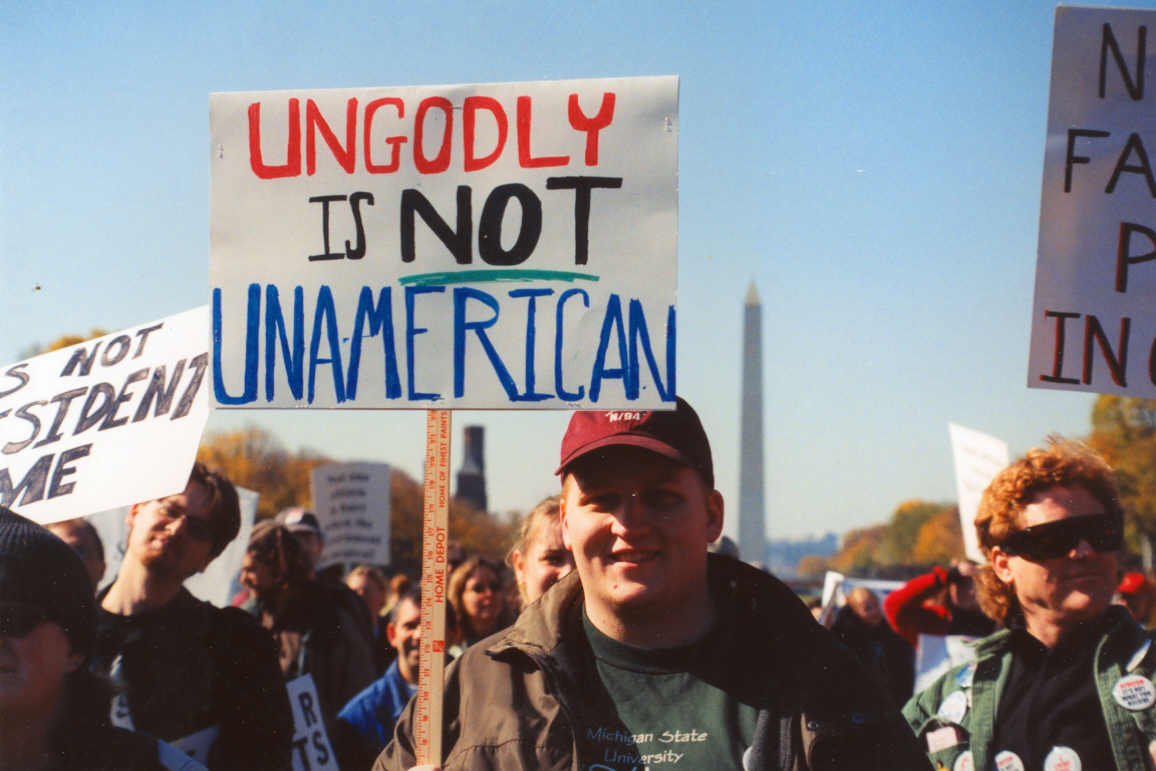
Marcher with sign

The Godless Americans March on Washington (GAMOW) occurred on the National Mall in Washington, DC, on November 2, 2002, with the participation of an estimated 2000-2500 atheists, agnostics, humanists, and freethinkers. The public cable network C-SPAN documented the event on video.

== Event timeline ==
The event started at 11:00 am near the Washington Monument, led by the American Atheists' banner promoting the separation of church and state. About halfway down the Mall, the people were confronted by counter-protesters. However, they continued to proceed to the other end of the Mall in front of the Capitol. At 11:30 am, the rally started and featured over 20 speakers and musical entertainment. The rally lasted for about four hours.

== Slogans ==
The event was marked by many slogans and banners on shirts, badges, etc., including "What Our Schools Need is a Moment of Science!", "Atheism is Myth-Understood!", "Secular Humanists for a Secular America" and "Citizen–Atheist–Patriot". The official T-shirt for the march showed a picture of the Capitol and the American flag with the statement "Free, Proud and on the Move–GODLESS AMERICANS".

== Speeches ==
Many speakers delivered speeches at the March. A few noted speakers were Frank Zindler, editor of the American Atheist magazine, Margaret Downey of the Freethought Society of Greater Philadelphia and Ed Buckner, executive director of the Council for Secular Humanism. The speeches delivered were basically on theism, atheism and related themes. Buckner reportedly attacked the way theists perceive atheists as lacking morality.

== Aims and objectives ==
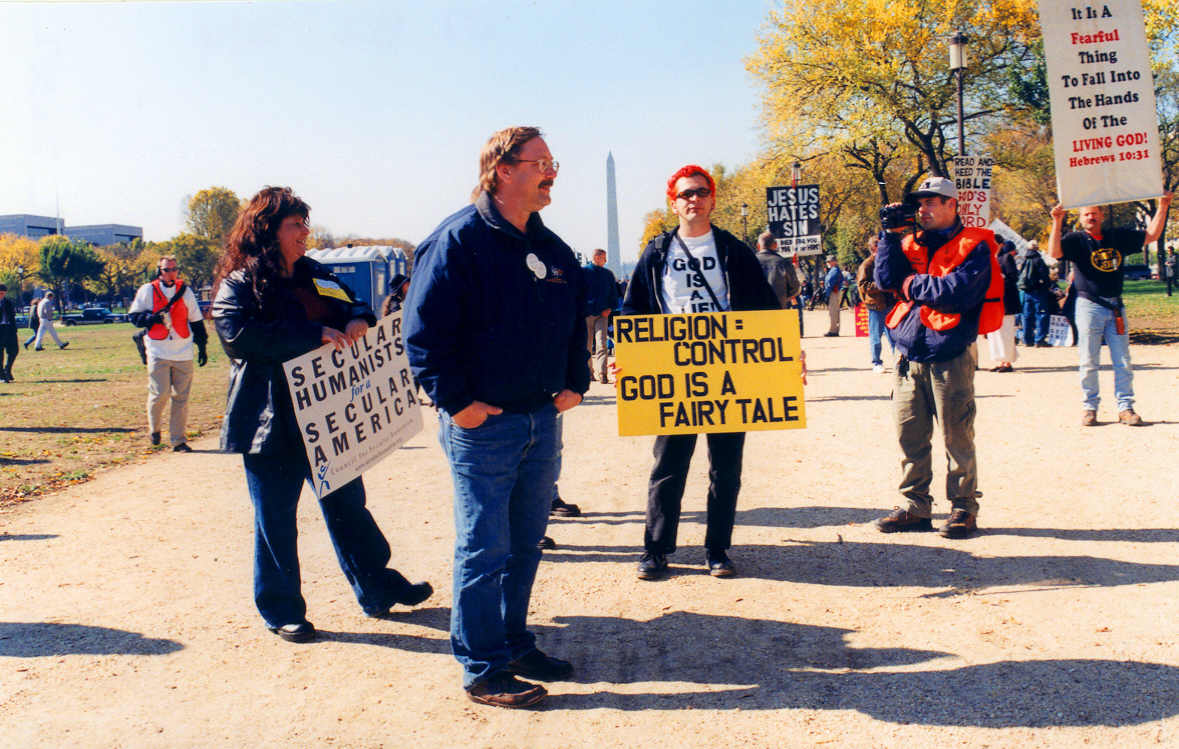
Several marchers with signs

Over two thousand atheists, freethinkers, agnostics and humanists gathered in a mile-long parade down The Mall to rally for several causes, including civil rights, church-state separation and a greater voice in the national political process.

Ellen Johnson, a former president of American Atheists and director of the Godless Americans March On Washington Task Force, announced at the event the formation of the Godless Americans Political Action Committee (GAMPAC), later renamed Enlighten the Vote.

== Event speakers ==
Speakers at the event included:

- Michael Newdow, activist
- Ed Buckner, Executive Director of the Council for Secular Humanism
- Taslima Nasrin, Bangladesh feminist and dissident writer
- Eddie Tabash, California attorney
- Douglas Campbell, Green Party candidate for Governor of Michigan
- August Brunsman, Secular Student Alliance founder
- Michael Rivers, Director of American Atheists in Utah
- Kathleen Johnson, Founder of the Military Association of Atheists & Freethinkers (MAAF), which provided security at the event
- Norm Allen, from the African Americans for Humanism
- Larry Darby, from the Alabama Atheists
- Bobbie Kirkhart from the Atheist Alliance International
- Margaret Downey from the Freethought Society of Greater Philadelphia
- Jim Strayer, from the Atheists of Florida
- John Scalise, from the Great Lakes Humanists
- Harry Greenberger from the New Orleans Secular Humanists
- "Reverend" Chris Harper of the fictitious Landover Baptist Church (also known as Americhrist Ltd.)

== Reaction and results ==
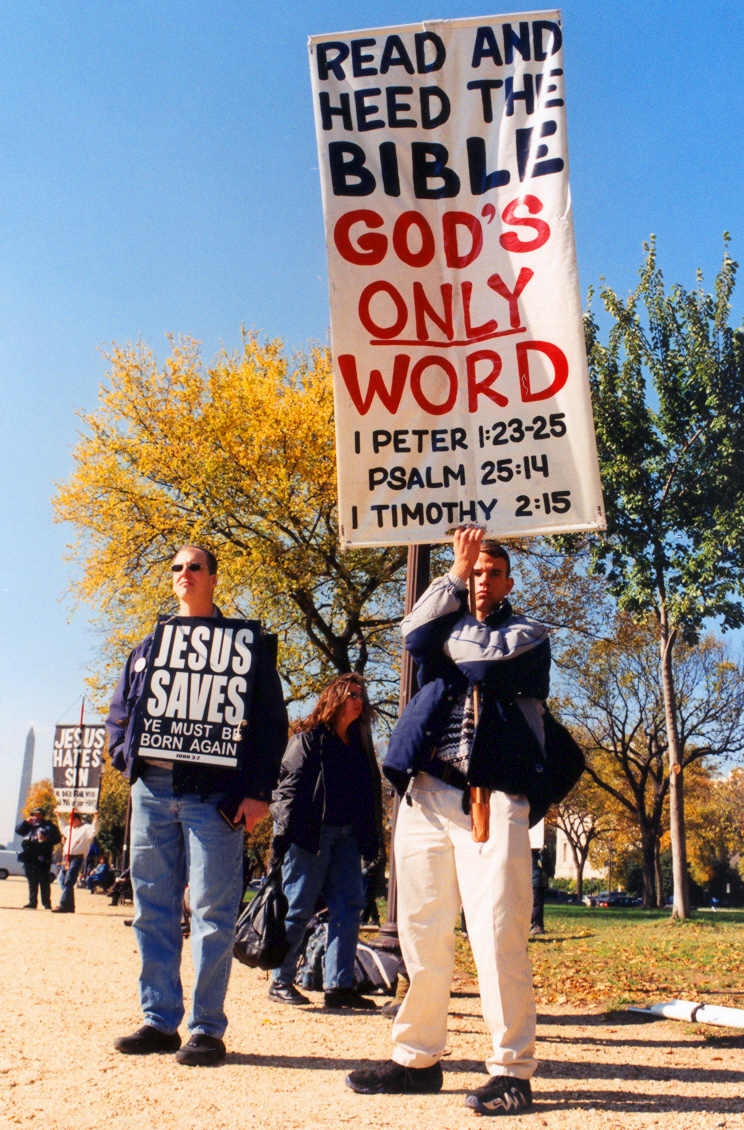
Christian counter-protestors

Atheist groups by and large considered the march a success, though some within the atheist community did criticize the event for a number of reasons, including the exclusion of theists from being able to endorse the event, how atheism was defined for the purposes of the march, and the apparent attempt by organizers to use the march as a way of "creating an identity for non-believers".

An organization calling itself the Religious Freedom Coalition ran newspaper advertisements the day before the event characterizing the views of atheists and Satanists to be identical. Following the event, the same organization called the event a success, but described it as "ill timed" and an indication of a dangerous brand of new atheism.

Following the march, leaders of three atheist organizations — Atheist Alliance International, the Institute for Humanist Studies and the Internet Infidels — met and set in motion the founding of the Secular Coalition for America.

Hemant Mehta of the blog the Friendly Atheist and the author of I Sold My Soul on eBay referred to the event in the context of the Reason Rally which was held on Saturday March 24, 2012.

Paul Geisert set up the Brights movement.
