= Drew Marshall =

Canadian talk show host (born 1966)

- Born: November 30, 1966 (age 59); Richmond Hill, Ontario, Canada
- Presenting career
- Show: The Drew Marshall Show
- Style: Talk radio
- Country: Canada
- Website: drewmarshall.ca

Drew Marshall (born November 30, 1966) was the host of The Drew Marshall Show, Canada's most listened to spiritual talk show, from 2003 to 2019.

== Radio ==
After moving back to Canada in 2003, Marshall successfully proposed a spiritually-oriented talk radio programme to CJYE (AM). He has interviewed Prime Minister Stephen Harper,

In June 2007, Marshall advertised in the Toronto Star newspaper that he would pay someone $500.00 to go to church with him. Inspired by the book, Jim and Casper Go to Church, and Hemant Mehta's book, I Sold My Soul on eBay, Marshall was looking to create dialogue about how outsiders view the church. Two university students, "Sabrina the Pagan" and "Taylor the Agnostic," were chosen to survey five Churches in Southern Ontario: Orangeville Baptist, Toronto Airport Christian Fellowship, The Prayer Palace, the Sanctuary, in Toronto, and The Meeting House. During this experiment both Sabrina and Taylor wrote about their experiences at the different churches on Marshall's blog, entitled, Hoof Hearted.

In January 2008, Marshall hosted the world's first Preacher Idol Contest. He asked people to "step out of the pew and into the pulpit". Individuals were asked to send in 10-minute videos of themselves, preaching to non-churched people. The videos were placed on YouTube and GodTube for audiences to view and vote on. The top three finalists of Preacher Idol were offered $2,000.00 in theological training and books and the opportunity to preach at one of Southern Ontario's mainstream churches.

September 2009 Marshall embarked on his next contest So You Think God Wants You To Sing (SYTGWYTS). In July 2010 Marshall made it public that he was no longer sure there was a God. During an interview with noted Christian Apologist Ravi Zacharias, Marshall revealed that he was having a crisis of faith. He chose to continue with his spiritual talk show in hopes of opening up a dialogue surrounding doubt and faith. He created DROOGLE, a web page devoted to 'Drew's search for God', as a forum for open and honest discussions on faith and the existence of God. It is possible that this is the only case of a Christian radio host admitting to a crisis of faith and not stepping down or losing their job. Marshall said he would be continuing his search publicly until December 18, 2010. He claimed to be hoping for "an encounter with God" for Christmas.

== Television, radio & speaking engagements ==
- Cast Member on Journey To Christmas, Documentary Filmed In Israel. Film released Christmas 2011.
- Featured in The Devil We Know, Documentary 2011.
- Test The Nation On CBC (January 24, 2010)
- Guest at The Global ComedyFest in Vancouver (September 26, 2010)
- 100 Huntley Street (January 29, 2007.)
- Q107.1 Calgary, The God Guy
- Listen Up TV (June 19, 2007.)
- Good News Sports (www.goodnewssports.ca)
- Tal Prince Live (Sirius Radio 161) April 6, 2008.
- Canadian Church Press, May 1, 2008."Christian Radio Host Tells Media Not to 'Tame' God"
- Canadian Association of Broadcaster's Annual Conference, Vancouver – Guest Panelist "The Societal Impact of Talk Radio"
- Write Canada's Annual Writer's Conference – Guest Faculty "Authors...You can write but can you survive an interview?"
- Youth For Christ Regional Conference 2008.
- Master of Ceremonies for Kingfest outdoor music festival.
