= AtheistTV =

Online television channel (2014–2016)

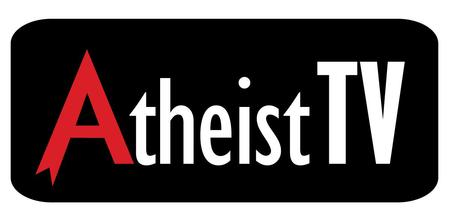
- Country: United States
- Availability: Worldwide
- Owner: American Atheists
- Launch date: July 29, 2014
- Affiliates: TelVue Corporation
- Official website: atheists.tv (Now redirects to Atheists.org)

AtheistTV was the world's first atheism-dedicated television channel. AtheistTV was founded by the American Atheists organisation, was announced on May 7, 2014, and launched on July 29 the same year. It was available through the Roku streaming network, as well as online through the American Atheists website.

As of August 2014, in addition to its live streaming channel, Atheist TV offers the following content:

- Richard Dawkins Foundation - Lectures and interviews with atheist activist and evolutionary biologist Richard Dawkins.
- Reason Rally - Videos from the 2012 Washington D.C. event
- 2014 National Convention - Highlights from the American Atheists convention held in Salt Lake City, Utah.
- The Atheist Experience - A call-in talk show for theists and atheists alike, hosted from Austin, Texas by Matt Dillahunty, Jenna Belk, Jim Barrows and Shannon Q.
- Commercials - Commercials and vlogs from assorted members.
- Films - Atheist-oriented short films and interviews
- The Atheist Viewpoint - Talk show episodes from the show of the same name from Cranford, New Jersey.
- 2011 National Convention - Highlights from the American Atheists national convention held in Des Moines, Iowa.
- Comedy - Keith Lowell Jensen (comedy routine)

On September 11, 2015, the livestream for AtheistTV was ended and the content was transferred to an on-demand streaming service of the same name. American Atheists said that this was due to the changes in the way people view content. It seems that this streaming service later ended, with the website redirects to the American Atheists website (Atheists.org) and the last capture of the streaming service through Wayback Machine being from December 2016.
