= David Silverman (activist) =

American atheist activist (born 1966)

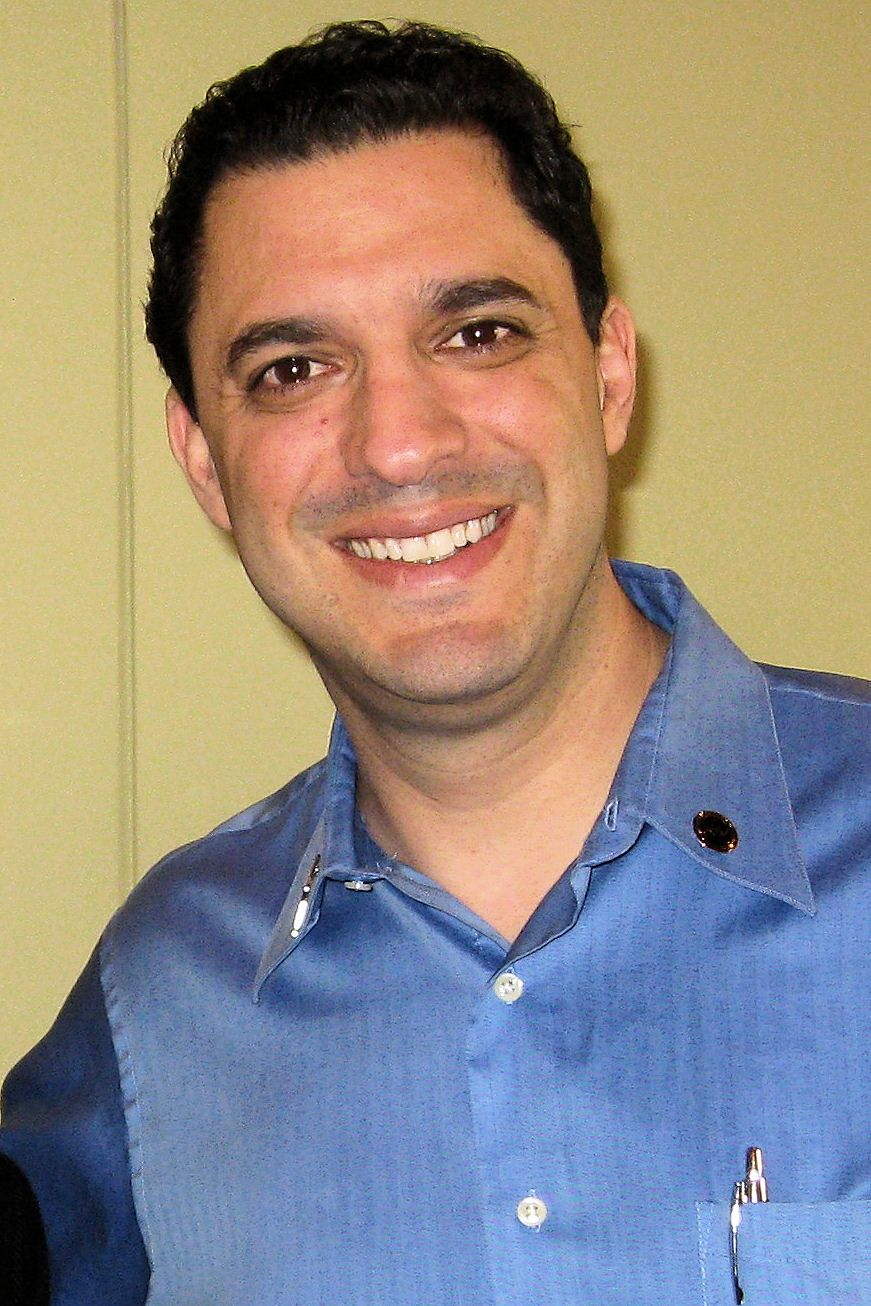
- Silverman in 2011

President of American Atheists
- In office 2010–2018
- Preceded by: Ed Buckner
- Succeeded by: Nick Fish

Personal details
- Born: August 13, 1966 (age 60) Marblehead, Massachusetts, U.S.
- Children: 1
- Education: Brandeis University (BS); Pennsylvania State University, University Park (MBA)
- Known for: Atheist activism, separation of church and state, criticism of religion

David Silverman (born August 13, 1966) is an American secular advocate.

Silverman previously served as president of American Atheists, a non-profit organization supporting the rights of atheists and the removal of expressions of religion in government, from 2010 to 2018. His annual anti-Christmas billboard, which calls Christmas "a myth," has often sparked controversy. Silverman is also the subject of the popular Are You Serious Face internet meme.

Silverman identifies as a firebrand atheist and defines firebrand atheism as vocally "attacking" humans' "silly" religious beliefs without attacking the individuals themselves.

== Early life ==
Silverman was born in a middle-class Reform Jewish family in Marblehead, Massachusetts. He went to Hebrew school and was bar mitzvahed when he was 13 years old.

Silverman began publicly challenging religion in high school and often states in interviews that he became an atheist at the age of six. Although he was never in the closet about his disbelief, he was forced to do his bar mitzvah. He calls this the turning point in his life where he decided never to lie about his atheism again because he had gotten up on stage and told all the people he knew that he believed in God. Seventeen years later his father admitted to him that he also was an atheist.

== Career and activism ==
Silverman speaking at the 2017 International Conference on Free Expression and Conscience in London

Silverman received a bachelor's degree in Computer Science from Brandeis University and MBA in Marketing from Penn State University, and an Advanced Graduate Certificate in International Business from Seton Hall. Silverman worked as a professional inventor at Bell Labs, with 74 patents.

=== American Atheists and Atheist Alliance International ===
Silverman worked with the American Atheists organization beginning in 1996, and holding a variety of roles, including: New Jersey State Director, Communications Director, and Vice President. He was elected president of American Atheists on September 16, 2010, following Ed Buckner.

During his tenure as Communications Director and Vice President of American Atheists, Silverman made several media appearances, but became especially visible since becoming president. An atheist awareness billboard campaign launched in December 2010 sparked controversy and increased media exposure for the organization. As a result of this campaign, Silverman appeared on a number of television shows since late 2010, most notably, The O'Reilly Factor on January 4, 2011.

It was under Silverman's direction that the American Atheists group sought to block the preservation of a cross-beam section of the World Trade Center skeleton that resembled a cross. Silverman opined: "The WTC cross has become a Christian icon. It has been blessed by so-called holy men and presented as a reminder that their God, who couldn't be bothered to stop the... terrorists or prevent 3,000 people from being killed in his name, cared only enough to bestow upon us some rubble that resembles a cross..."

=== Misconduct controversy ===
On April 13, 2018, Silverman was terminated as president of American Atheists over complaints of financial and sexual misconduct. Silverman had been placed on paid leave on April 10 pending an investigation into a complaint received on April 7. The day after his termination, BuzzFeed News published an article detailing allegations of unwanted sexual contact by two women, subsequently denied by Silverman. The new president of American Atheists, Nick Fish, specified that Silverman's termination was not over sexual allegations, but as a result of a "loss of confidence" stemming from violations of internal policies on staff management, conflicts of interest, and their general code of conduct.

Silverman was appointed Executive Director of Atheist Alliance International (AAI) in October 2019. He resigned from his position in December 2019. AAI President Gail Miller recognized Silverman "for the contribution he had made in reorganizing the AAI board and its operations".

=== Media appearances ===
Silverman attended and spoke at the 2011 American Atheists National Convention, in Des Moines, Iowa. During his speech, he announced plans for the Reason Rally. On March 24, 2012, the Reason Rally took place at the National Mall in Washington, D.C., and was the largest atheist gathering in world history. Silverman was the Creator and Executive Producer of the event, and the President of the Reason Rally Coalition, the coalition he founded to run the rally.

On October 28, 2011, Silverman and Dinesh D'Souza participated in a public debate on whether Christianity is beneficial for America.

Silverman went on Fox News's Hannity to discuss Christmas-themed billboards that American Atheists put up in Times Square, New York City. He also gave a talk to the Secular Humanist Jewish Circle in Tucson, Arizona detailing the incorrectness of Jewish atheism and how religion lies in general to promote itself.

Silverman's first book, Fighting God: An Atheist Manifesto for a Religious World, was released on December 1, 2015.

=== Anti-Christmas billboards ===
Silverman has spearheaded the controversial anti-Christmas campaign by placing strategically placed billboards from New York City to San Francisco featuring unapologetic slogans like "Keep the Merry, Dump the Myth!", "You Know It's a Myth. This Season, Celebrate Reason" and "Dear Santa all I want for Christmas is to skip church!" The anti-Christmas billboards and subsequent TV appearances are often followed by a growth in subscribers and donations.

Silverman has also launched antireligion billboard campaigns in the Bible Belt, urging people to skip church.

== Personal life ==
Silverman has one child who attended I.L. Peretz Secular Jewish school.

Silverman rejects the label of being "Jewish" and in a speech in Phoenix titled "I'm an Atheist and So Are You", he urged a secular Jewish audience to follow his lead and abandon the term "Jew". Silverman has argued that Judaism is neither a culture, a race or a nationality.

== See also ==
- Atheism in the United States
- List of American atheists

Preceded by Ed Buckner	President of American Atheists; 2010–2018	Succeeded by Nick Fish
