= Charles E. Stevens American Atheist Library and Archives =

Library in Cranford, New Jersey, US

Charles E. Stevens American Atheist Library and Archives (CESAALA) is a collection of over 40,000 volumes of books, documents, and various other research tools located in Cranford, New Jersey, United States. It was founded by the American Atheists and currently records oral histories of various intellectuals and lecturers. The library also contains "historical pamphlets, leather-bound volumes, early free-thought publications, and other separationist arcana." The library is valued at between $1 million and $3 million and is one of American Atheists' most valuable assets. The American Atheist Press is a division of the Charles E. Stevens American Atheist Library.

== Namesake ==
The library is named for Charles E. Stevens, a stonemason from Hawthorne, California. Stevens had fought in the Spanish Civil War and was well into his 80s when he first donated money to Madalyn Murray O'Hair and the American Atheists. He supported O'Hair and her fight to banish mandatory prayer in public schools and supported free thought. He wrote to O'Hair, telling her that when he was growing up he was too poor to afford books and wanted to now support the building of a library that would promote works often banned from other libraries. Deeply touched by his sentiment, O'Hair vowed to name the finished library after Stevens, which got its official name in 1969. Stevens first wrote a check for $1,000 on February 26, 1965. A scanned copy of the original check can be found at the CESAALA website. Over the course of his lifetime, Stevens donated $8,000 to O'Hair and the library, which was his entire life's savings. When O'Hair learned that Stevens had donated all the money he had, she tried to contact him to return the funds, only to discover that he had since died.

== Volumes ==
The purpose of the CESAALA was to provide other atheists information and support to defend themselves when being persecuted. By 1987, the library had accumulated 40,000 volumes and 25,000 pieces of archived material. Presently, the library houses between 100,000 and 140,000 documents.

== Madalyn Murray O'Hair ==
Madalyn Murray O'Hair had problems with the Internal Revenue Service for years. In 1993, she believed she might lose the library due to pending litigation with the IRS. Deciding to move the library to another location, O'Hair, along with her future murderer David Waters, individually packed each book in special acid-free paper to be shipped to a secret storage facility. Despite all of the IRS problems, official releases from the American Atheists claim the move was simply for space issues and that the library needed to be bigger. In late 1993 a computer with the only copy of the library's catalog was stolen and never recovered. In 1997, the IRS finally took away tax-exemption status from all of the American Atheist organizations, including the CESAALA. The IRS claimed that the library owed nearly $20,000 in back taxes. This loss of tax-exemption status would hinder the library's ability to accept donations, since contributors would not be able to write such charitable donations off in their taxes.

== Future plans ==
According to the current CESAALA librarian Timothy Dicks, the library still has "a huge quantity of letters, ephemera, and other items that we have to identify and catalogue." There also are thousands of hours' worth of audio and video recordings being archived at the library on a wide variety of media. Because of the degradation rate of such formats, like cassette and videotape, librarians at CESAALA are working fast to digitize the audio and video which include American Atheist conventions and protests, the American Atheist Radio series, and the American Atheist Oral History Project. The library plans to create a searchable, public catalog that will contain the digitized formats of rare documents, photographs, video and audio; although the library is not currently open to the public, serious researchers can contact the American Atheists for access to the collection.
