= Hemant Mehta =

American activist (born 1983)

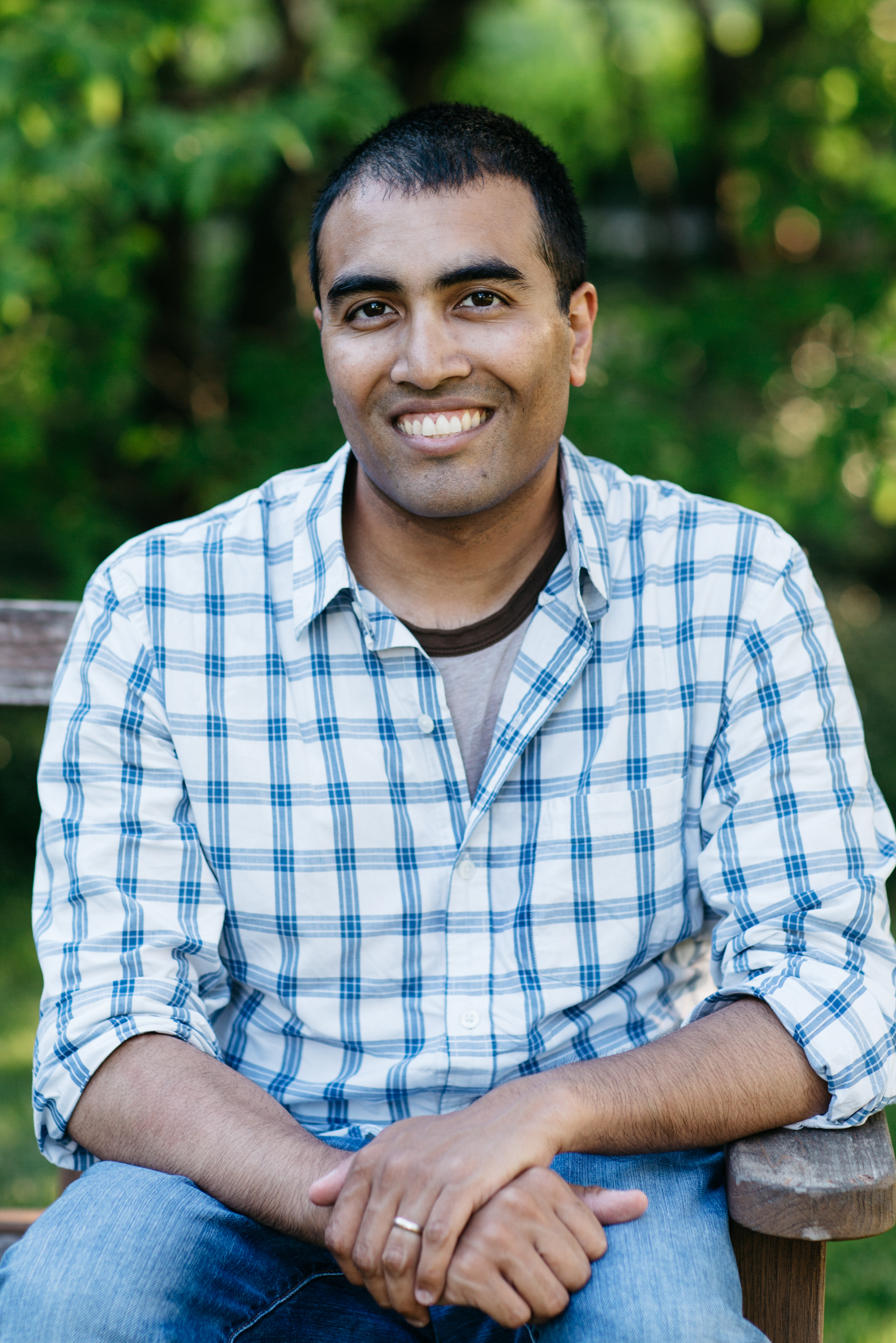
- Born: February 25, 1983 (age 43); Chicago, Illinois, U.S.
- Education: University of Illinois, Chicago (BS); DePaul University (MS)
- Writing career
- Pen name: The Friendly Atheist
- Notable works: I Sold My Soul on eBay; Friendly Atheist blog; Friendly Atheist Podcast
- Website: friendlyatheist.substack.com

Hemant Mehta (/ˈhɛmənt mɛtə/; born February 25, 1983) is an American author, blogger, YouTuber, atheist activist and former teacher. He currently runs the Friendly Atheist channel, and used to run the channel, The Atheist Voice. Mehta is a regular speaker at atheist events, and he has been a board member of charitable organizations such as the Secular Student Alliance and the Foundation Beyond Belief.

Mehta used to run the Friendly Atheist blog on Patheos, in which he and his associates published articles several times a day, and he also co-hosts a weekly podcast called the Friendly Atheist Podcast. The blog stopped its activities on Patheos from December 14, 2021. As of 2024, Mehta also publishes a newsletter.

On April 1, 2020, Mehta won his first appearance on the television game show Jeopardy!.

== Biography ==
Mehta was born in Chicago, Illinois in 1983. He graduated from the University of Illinois at Chicago in 2004 with a double degree in math and biology and began teaching in 2007. He acquired a master's degree in math education from DePaul University in 2010 and a national board certification in teaching in 2012. He taught high school math at Neuqua Valley High School until 2014 when he announced on Facebook and his blog that he had submitted his resignation to the school, citing that "As much as I love being in the classroom, the opportunities online are just a lot greater right now, and I don't want to have any regrets down the road about not taking this chance while I have it." After his resignation, he stayed on as the head coach of the school's speech team.

Mehta was raised in the Jain faith. He became an atheist when he was around 14 after doubting his faith. Seeking to learn more about what motivated many Americans to be religious, he decided to attend and take notes at a number of churches across the United States. He based his choice of churches to attend on the results of an eBay auction in which he offered his bidders, "I am an atheist. You can bid on where I go to church or a temple or a mosque, etc." Mehta's experiences at the churches became the basis for his book, I Sold My Soul on eBay. Despite being an atheist, he has stated his Jain upbringing has influenced him in his daily life, including when he sees insects.

== Activism ==
Hemant Mehta established a secular student group, Students WithOut Religious Dogma (SWORD), at the University of Illinois at Chicago while earning dual degrees there. Later, still in college, he was board chair for the Secular Student Alliance. He interned at the Center for Inquiry where he became familiar with a lot of the national organizations and leaders in the activist world at that time. He was on the board of directors for the Foundation Beyond Belief, a non-profit charitable organization.

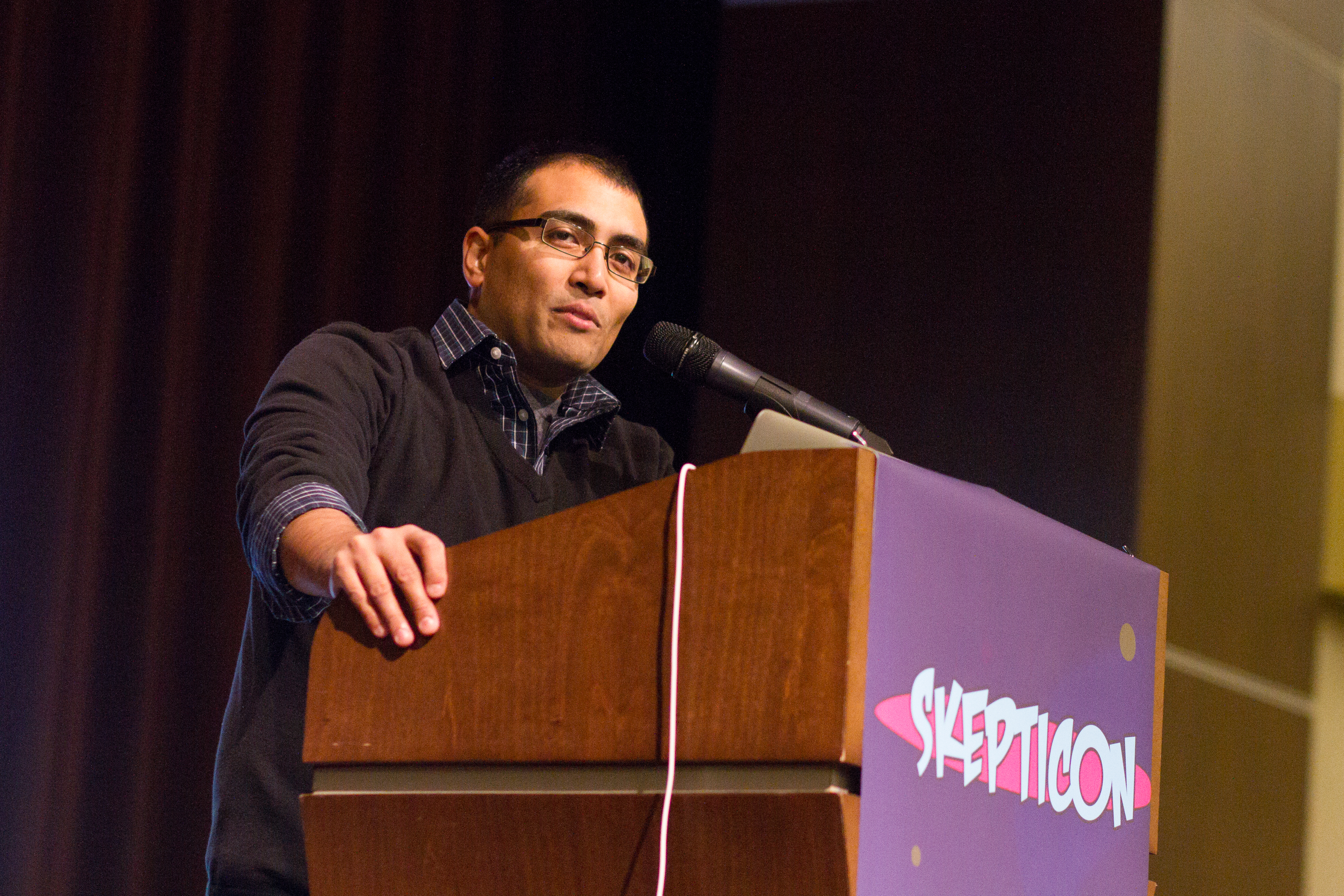
Hemant Mehta at Skepticon in 2014

Mehta is a regular speaker at freethought and skeptical events around the U.S. He attempts to build bridges of understanding between believers and non-believers through his blog, The Friendly Atheist. Due in part to his positive message, he is also invited to speak at atheist events such as the one he presented at The Reason Rally or at the American Atheists Annual Convention in March 2012.

A vocal advocate of building an atheist community, Mehta's activism includes fundraising for charitable causes. He helped establish and served on the board of the Foundation Beyond Belief, which raised more than $2,400,000 since it launched in 2010. He also established a church cleanup fund in response to reports of church vandalism in Bend, Oregon, in 2012. The vandals tagged the church with allusions to the Church of the Flying Spaghetti Monster, and Mehta's readers contributed nearly $3,000 in one day to help clean up the damage.

Mehta wrote for the "On Faith" column in The Washington Post and has been featured in a New York Times debate on prayer.

When he has been asked about his beliefs, he has stated: "Simply put, I have never seen any evidence of 'God's work' in action. I've seen what people think is God's work, but which actually has perfectly natural explanations. I believe that most people are good, even when nobody's looking. I believe our best path to discovering the truth lies in science, not religion."

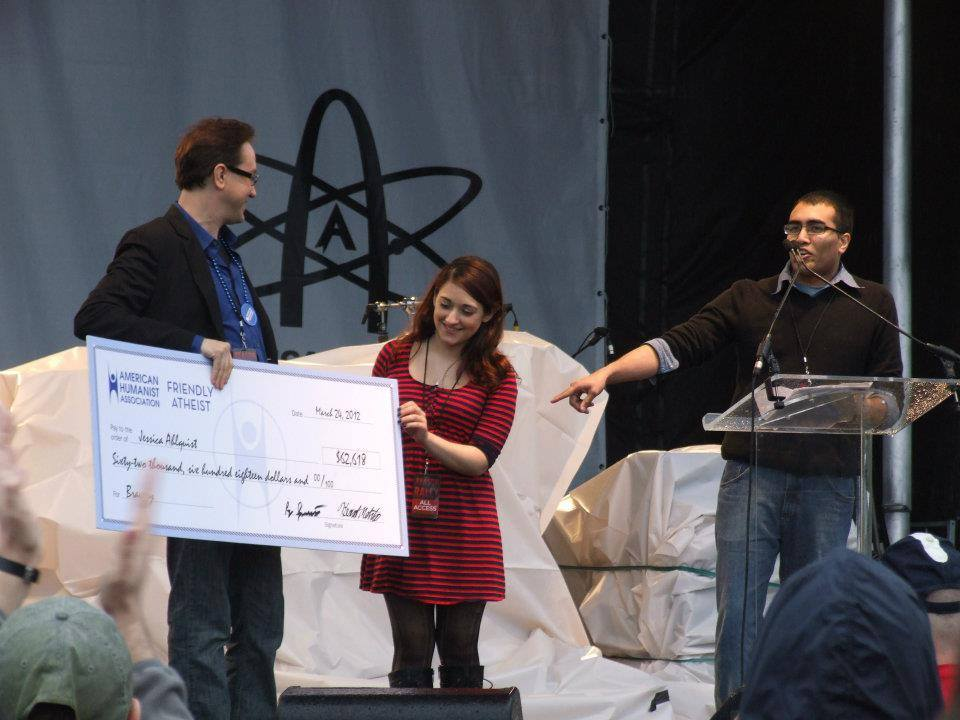
Hemant Mehta presents scholarship cheque to Jessica Ahlquist at Reason Rally

In June 2013, Mehta wrote for the "Room for Debate" series in the New York Times, where he argued that "There's a very real downside to praying. It lulls believers into a false sense of accomplishment." In July 2013, he held an open discussion at the Oak Hills Church in San Antonio, Texas, where he explained his frustration at being confronted time and again with the same arguments for believing in God. He also commented that "Many Christians had negative stereotypes about atheists that prevented fruitful conversation."

Mehta was a guest on CNN on August 20, 2013, to discuss the rise of atheism among the millennial generation. Also in 2013, he began publishing "The Atheist Voice" series of video discussions on YouTube, which had over 215 thousand subscribers in 2020. He started a second channel, Friendly Atheist, in 2019, and has since gained almost 100 thousand subscribers.

Mehta is the co-host, with Jessica Bluemke, of a weekly podcast named the Friendly Atheist Podcast, which has produced nearly 600 episodes as of September 2025.

In 2025, he was awarded the Humanist Media Award by the American Humanist Association.

== Published works ==
In January 2006, Mehta posted an auction on eBay where he explained his background in atheism and offered to go to the worship services of the winning bidder's choosing. The auction ended on February 3, 2006, with a final bid of $504 from Jim Henderson, a minister from Seattle, Washington. Mehta later donated that money to the Secular Student Alliance, a non-profit organization for which he served as chair of the board of directors.

Nearly a month after the auction, an article about Mehta's experiences appeared on the front page of The Wall Street Journal,. He was featured in the Chicago Sun-Times, the Seattle Times, and the Village Voice, and on National Public Radio. Henderson asked Mehta to visit a variety of churches and write about the experiences on Henderson's website, offthemap.com. Mehta eventually wrote about his visits at nine different churches as well as two additional pieces dealing with atheist conventions and Christian media. I Sold My Soul on eBay contains Mehta's observations and critiques of the churches along with background on how he became an atheist.

Other published works include The Young Atheist's Survival Guide published in 2012 and The Friendly Atheist: Thoughts on the Role of Religion in Politics and Media published in 2013. The former is aimed at students, teachers, and parents who may face ostracism due to their lack of religious belief. The latter is intended as a study guide for the many things written by Mehta.

In August 2014, Mehta announced his latest project, God is an Abusive Boyfriend (and you should break up), based on his YouTube series, The Atheist Voice. However, Mehta cancelled the project after receiving negative feedback from his readers.
