= 6 World Trade Center (1974–2001) =

Former building in Manhattan, New York

- 6 World Trade Center in 1973
- Alternative names: 6 WTC; WTC 6; Building 6

General information
- Status: Demolished
- Type: Office
- Architectural style: Modern
- Location: Lower Manhattan, New York City, United States
- Coordinates: 40°42′46″N 74°00′48″W
- Current tenants: List
- Construction started: c. 1969–1970
- Completed: 1973
- Opened: January 1974
- Demolished: Late 2001 (heavily damaged on September 11, 2001)
- Owner: Port Authority of New York and New Jersey

Height
- Height: 93.28 ft (28 m)

Technical details
- Floor count: 8
- Floor area: 537,693 sq ft (49,953 m^{2})

Design and construction
- Architects: Yamasaki & Associates; Emery Roth & Sons
- Structural engineer: Leslie E. Robertson Associates
- Main contractor: Tishman Construction

6 World Trade Center, also known as the U.S. Customs Building, was an eight-story building in Lower Manhattan in New York City. It opened in 1974 and was the building in the World Trade Center complex that had the fewest stories. The building served as the U.S. Customs House for New York. It was demolished in late 2001 due to the damage sustained by the collapse of the North Tower during the September 11 attacks. Its site is now the location of the new One World Trade Center and the Perelman Performing Arts Center, the new 6 World Trade Center.

== History ==
6 World Trade Center was first proposed in 1968 as part of the original World Trade Center complex. The building was designed by Minoru Yamasaki, along with Emery Roth & Sons. Construction was completed in 1973 on the eight-story building. 6 World Trade Center was home to the U.S. Customs Service for the state of New York, from 1974 to 2001.

== Tenants ==
The following is a list of tenants of 6 World Trade Center prior to the terrorist attacks on September 11, 2001:

FL#	Companies
7	United States Customs Service
6	United States Department of Commerce, Bureau of Alcohol, Tobacco, Firearms and Explosives, United States Department of Labor, US Export Assistance Center
5	—
4	—
3	—
2	Bureau of Alcohol, Tobacco, Firearms and Explosives
P	North bridge to World Financial Center, Escalators from 1WTC lobby
C	Storage, loading docks, lower lobby, firing range

=== September 11 attacks and cleanup ===
During the September 11 attacks, the collapse of the North Tower destroyed large sections of 6 World Trade Center. Two days later, within the crushed section of the building, two steel beams connected in the shape of a cross were found, believed to be debris from the tower. The beams have since become known as the World Trade Center cross, and is displayed within the National September 11 Memorial & Museum.

The building's ruins were demolished to make way for reconstruction of the current World Trade Center site. AMEC Construction handled the demolition, in which the building was weakened and then pulled down with cables. The new One World Trade Center and Perelman Performing Arts Center stand at the site where 6 World Trade Center originally stood.

== Gallery ==
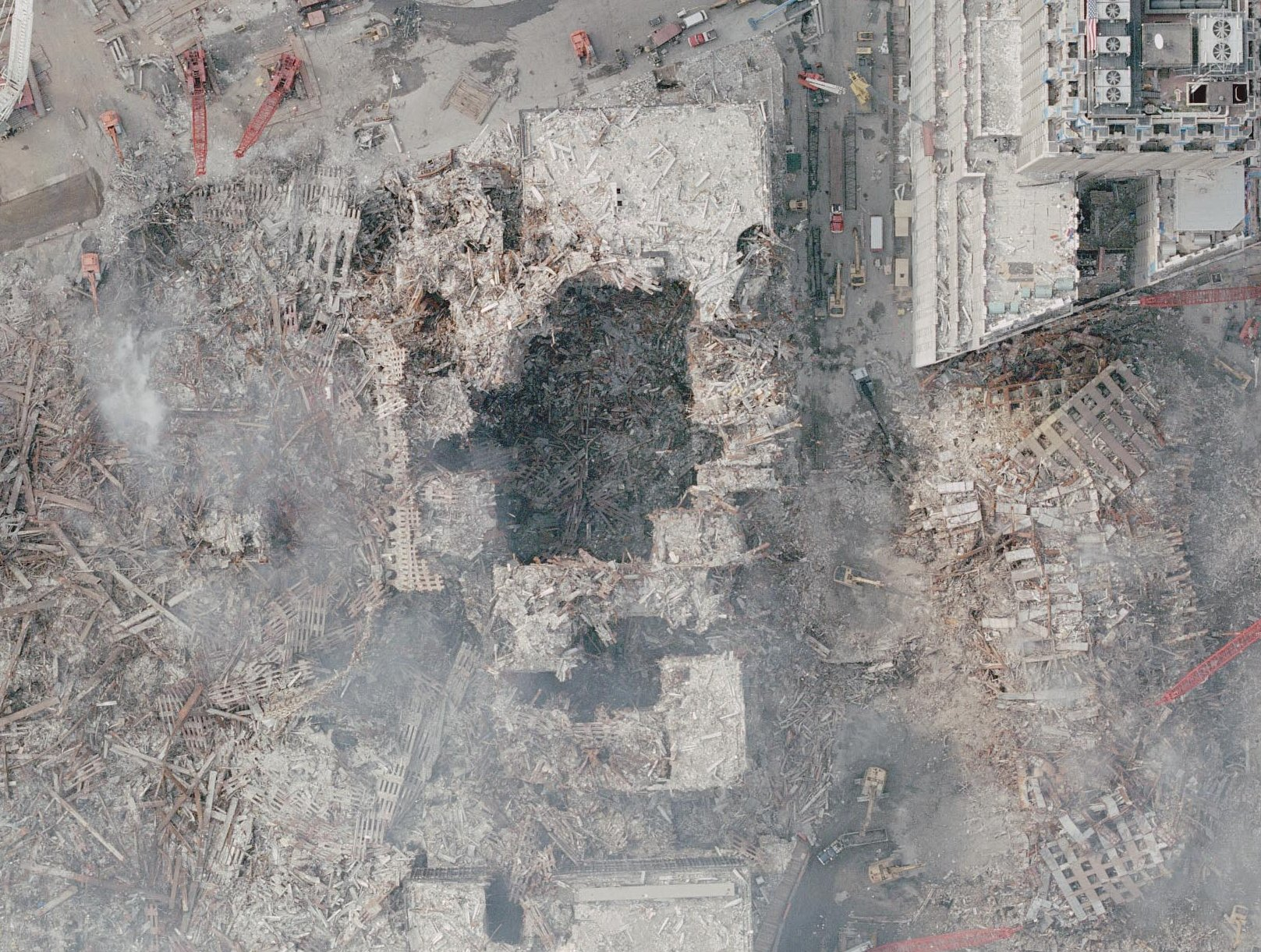
NOAA aerial image following the September 11 attacks. North is approximately upper right on the image.

Map of WTC site. 6 WTC located in upper left corner of WTC Plaza.

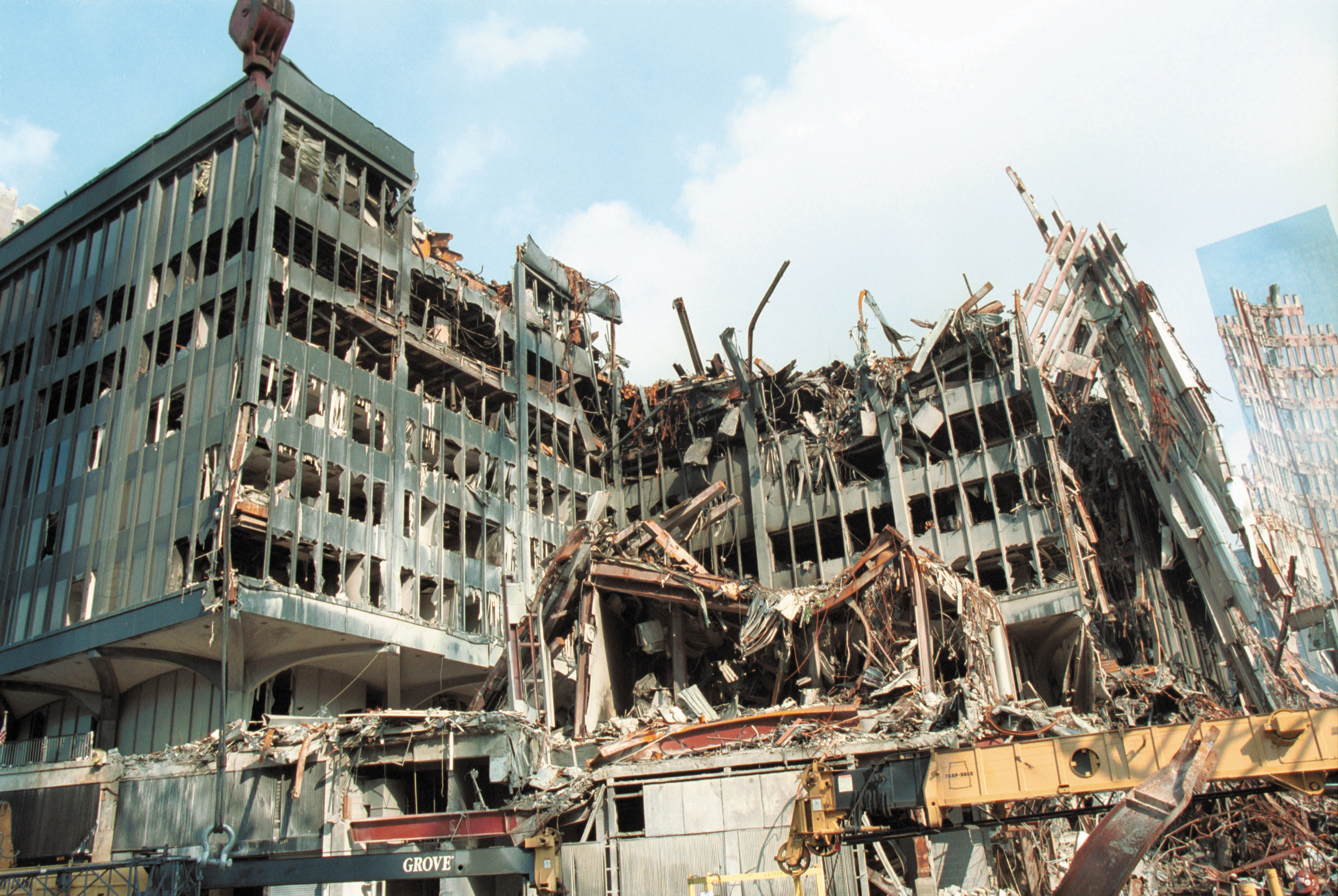
Southwest corner of 6 World Trade Center after the September 11 attacks

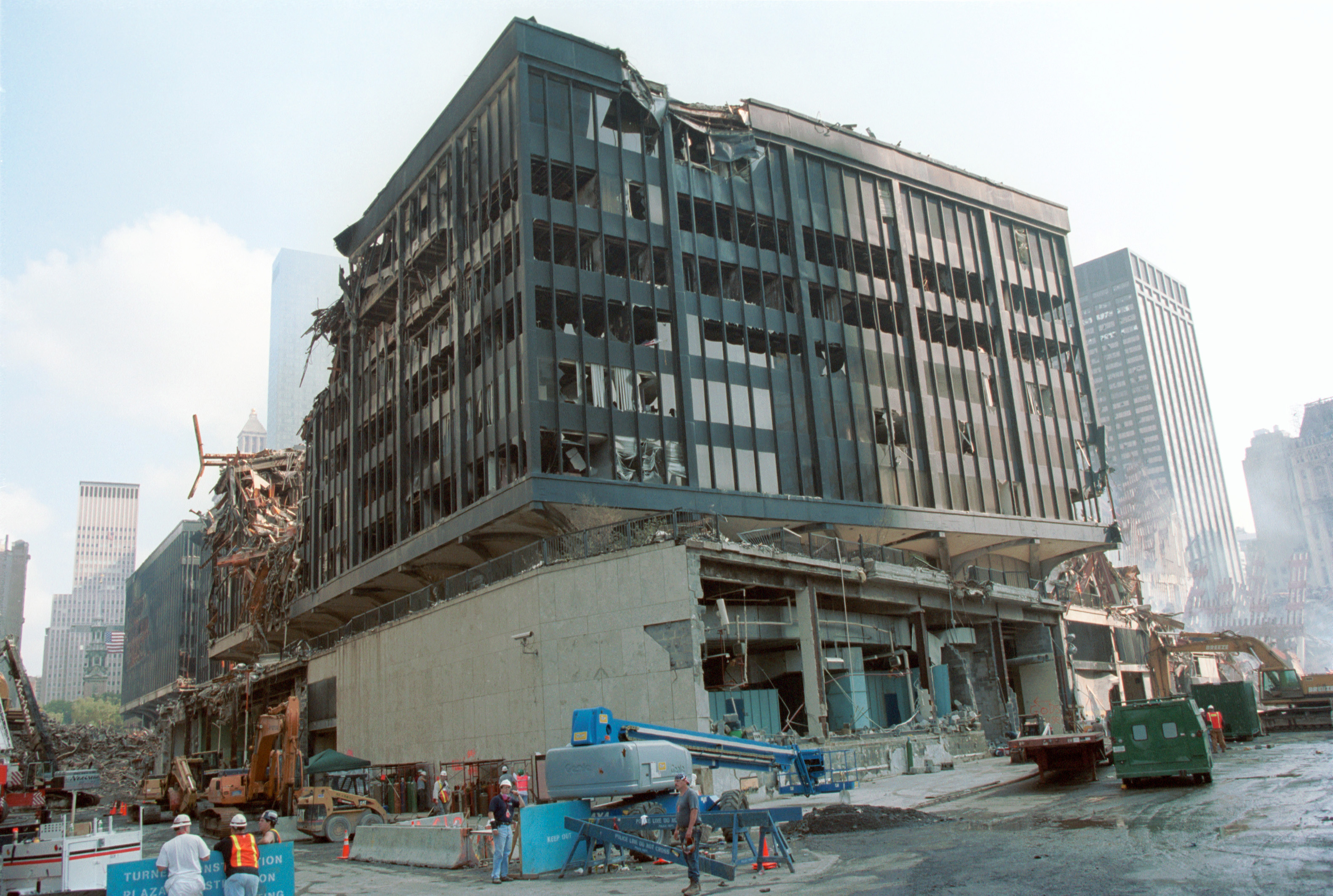
6 WTC during Ground Zero cleanup operations.

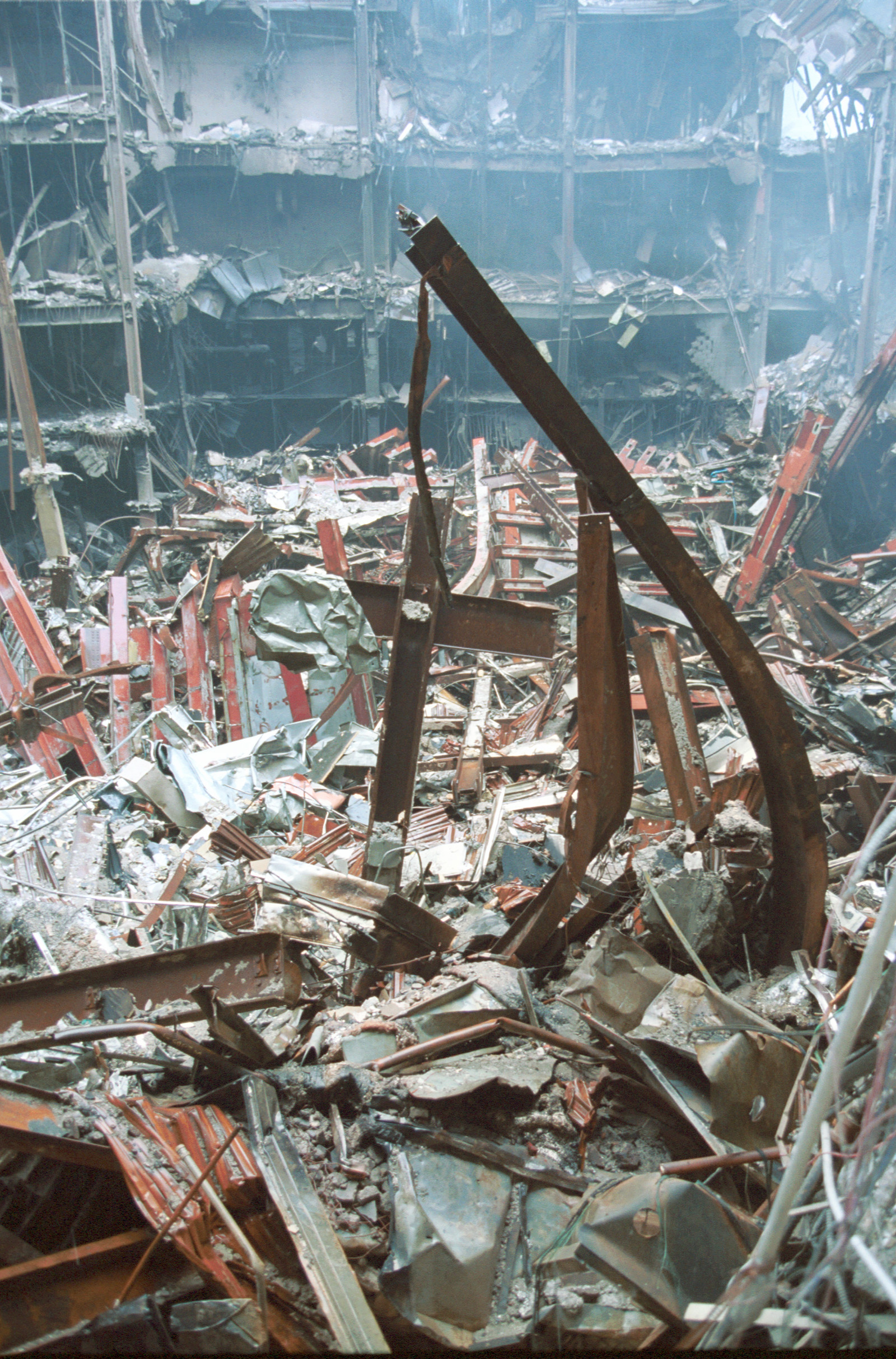
Interior of 6 WTC showing debris from the North Tower in the open area, including a piece that became the World Trade Center cross.

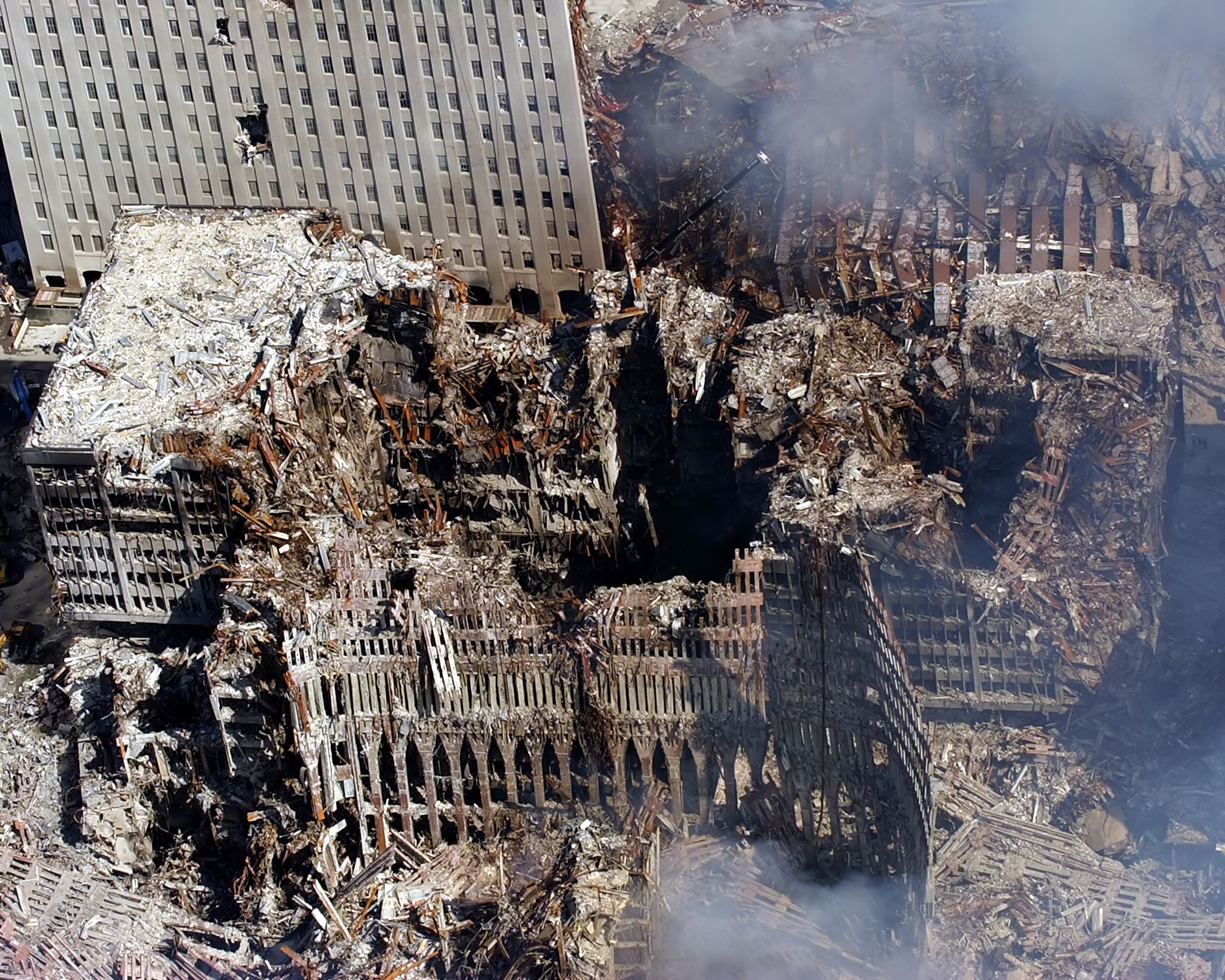
6 WTC's remains on September 17, 2001.

== See also ==
- Marriott World Trade Center
