= American Atheist Magazine =

Atheist magazine published by American Atheists

- 50th anniversary cover.
- Editor-in-chief: Alyssa Fuller and Tom Van Denburgh
- Categories: Secularism, news magazine
- Frequency: Quarterly
- Publisher: American Atheists, Inc
- Founded: 1971
- Country: United States
- Based in: Cranford, New Jersey
- Language: English
- Website: www.atheists.org/magazine/
- ISSN: 0516-9623
- OCLC: 60639278

American Atheist: A Journal of Atheist News and Thought, commonly known as American Atheist Magazine, is a quarterly magazine currently edited by Alyssa Fuller and Tom Van Denburgh and published by American Atheists. American Atheist is available in print with an annual membership in American Atheists and in PDF form on Scribd.com.

== History ==
The magazine was established in Austin, Texas. The name of the magazine has changed several times over the course of its history. An early issue is numbered Volume 1, Number 1 (January 1971) and is titled: The American Atheist – Poor Richard's Reports.

Frank Zindler documented the beginning of the magazine as follows:

It is impossible to determine exactly when the magazine began. It appears ultimately to have grown out of a mimeographed newsletter that Madalyn Murray O'Hair circulated in Baltimore before her 1963 victory in SCOTUS [Supreme Court of the United States]. Certain reconstructions (e.g., the fact that the Sept. 1975 issue is labeled Vol. 17, No. 9) would place this in 1958, but that does not seem likely. In any case, there may have been a publication in the early 1960s styling itself a magazine, but no copies survive at the American Atheist Center in NJ. Over the course of American Atheists history, there have been a number of newsletters, both general and private (i.e., a members' Insider's Newsletter). It is possible that the Volume 17 numbering for 1975 represents a continuation of the numbering of a newsletter going back to the late 1950s.

The issue bearing the earliest publication data was printed in [fax] in American Atheist, Vol. 46, No. 6 (July, 2008). It is numbered Vol. 1, No. 1, and is dated January, 1971. The title includes the definite article —The American Atheist—and carries the subtitle Poor Richard's Reports.

The earliest issue of the magazine in the archives of Zindler (still carrying the definite article in the title, but no longer having a subtitle) is numbered Vol. 17, No. 7 and dated July 1975. As Zindler wrote: "Thus, the circumstances surrounding the date at which the publication of the present journal American Atheist began are a complete mystery."

On the other hand, American Atheists, Inc. uploaded three issues from 1964 (starting with vol. 6, no. 3, March 1964) to Scribd.

By late 1991, publication became extremely sporadic, lapsing entirely in early 1992. The magazine eventually resumed publication in late 1996.

=== Documentable publication of the magazine ===
- March 1964 to autumn of 1992
- Winter 1996 to present

=== Editors ===
- Richard F. O'Hair: Editor-in-chief V1N1 January 1971 until V18N1 January 1976.
- Madalyn (Murray) O'Hair: Associate Editor V1N1 January 1971. Contributing Editor V17N8 Aug. 1975. Editor V18N2 Feb 1976). Editor-in-chief V19N2 Feb. 1977. Editor Emeritus V25N7 July 1983. (Murdered Sept/Oct, 1995)
- Robin Eileen Murray-O'Hair: Poetess V23N5 May 81. Poetry V23N7 July 1981 until Editor-in-chief V25N7, July 1983. (Murdered Sept/Oct 1995)
- Edmund Bojarski: General Editor, December 1977 through February 1978
- Frank Duffy: General Editor V20N8 (April 1978) through V21N4 (April 1979) >>
- Ellen Johnson: Editor V44N2 (April 2006) through V46N5 (June 2008)
- Frank R. Zindler: Editor & Managing Editor V35N1 (Winter 1996–1997) through V44N2 (JanFebMar 2006). Editor, American Atheist Press V44N2 (April 2006) through V46N5 (June 2008). Editor; Managing Editor, V46N6 (July 2008) through V47N1 (January 2009). Managing Editor, V47N2 (Feb 2009) up to the present. Resumes being Editor, American Atheist, for V49N2 (2Q2011)
- Bill Hampl: General Editor, American Atheist V47N2 (Feb 09) throughV47N7 (Oct 09)
- Pamela Whissel: Editor-in-chief V49N3 (3Q2011) to V58N2 (March/Apr 2020)
- Alyssa Fuller: Managing Editor V59N1 (1Q2021) to current

=== George H. W. Bush controversy ===
Vice President George H. W. Bush was questioned by American Atheist Press news reporter Rob Sherman at Chicago's O'Hare Airport on 27 August 1987, just after announcing his candidacy for president. Sherman asked Bush about separation of church and state and about his opinion of the citizenship and patriotism of Atheists. Sherman quoted him as saying:

No, I don't know that atheists should be regarded as citizens, nor should they be regarded as patriotic. This is one nation under God...I support the separation of church and state. I'm just not very high on atheists.

An exchange of letters that took place in 1989 between the late Jon Garth Murray, then president of American Atheists, and White House Counsel C. Boyden Gray, prove that the conversation with Vice President Bush took place, exactly as reported. Those two letters are on file at the Bush Presidential Library in Texas. The letter from Mr. Murray to Mr. Gray is expected to be available in late 2013 as a part of a file called Item # CF 01193-002, but a related letter by Mr. Murray to the Members of Congress, which referenced Mr. Murray's letter to Mr. Gray, is available for public view. The reply letter from Mr. Gray to Mr. Murray is also available for public view.

The letter from Mr. Murray to the Members of Congress is from a file identified as White House Office of Records Management, Subject Code RM, Document Number 157715 CU. This document is a letter that Jon Murray sent to every Member of Congress on February 21, 1990. In this letter, Mr. Murray describes the news conference that Zindler attended and quotes exactly the conversation between Mr. Bush and Zindler, and then states:

...the President is a religious man who neither supports atheism nor believes that atheism should be unnecessarily encouraged or supported by the government. Needless to say, the President supports the Constitution and laws of the United States, and you may rest assured that this Administration will proceed at all times with due regard for the legal rights of atheists, as will as others with whom the President disagrees.

Mr. Murray's letter to the Members of Congress went on to say that Mr. Bush must issue "an apology and retraction of the remarks or alternately the Congress of the United States must pass a resolution censuring President Bush for the remarks." The letter from Mr. Gray to Mr. Murray is located in a file identified as White House Office of Records Management, Subject Code RM, Document Number 041388 CU.
