= Hardesty Public School District =

School district in Oklahoma

Hardesty Public School District is a public school district in Hardesty, Texas County, Oklahoma, United States, located in the southeastern corner of Texas County in the Oklahoma Panhandle ten miles north of the Oklahoma/Texas state line.

The district runs two schools, both located within the town of Hardesty: Hardesty Elementary School, and Hardesty High School. Hardesty High School's mascot is the Bison. The Hardesty School District covers approximately 250 square miles.

In 2007, the Smalkowski family sued Hardesty High School after their daughter was kicked off of the basketball team, stating that their daughter's constitutional rights had been violated by what they argued is endorsement of school prayer and Christianity by the school. The district argued it does not sponsor religious activities and that her removal was for reasons having nothing to do with her atheism. PACER shows the federal case, CIV-06-845-M, ended with that Stipulation of Dismissal with Prejudice filed October 29, 2008 and signed by all parties.
