= American Atheists =

Atheism activist organization

- Formation: 1963; 63 years ago Austin, Texas, U.S.
- Type: 501(c)(3) organization
- Tax ID no.: 74-2466507
- Purpose: Promote atheism and secular humanism; oppose religion in the public sphere
- Location: Cranford, New Jersey, U.S.
- Website: atheists.org

American Atheists is a non-profit organization in the United States dedicated to defending the civil liberties of atheists and advocating complete separation of church and state. It provides speakers for colleges, universities, clubs, and the news media. It also publishes books and American Atheist Magazine.

The organization was founded in 1963 by Madalyn Murray O'Hair. She had earlier filed a lawsuit against her school board, with her son William J. Murray as plaintiff, to challenge compulsory prayer and Bible-reading in public schools. Her case, Murray v. Curlett, was consolidated with Abington School District v. Schempp before being heard by the United States Supreme Court. In 1963, the Supreme Court ruled that mandatory Bible reading in public schools was unconstitutional.

== History ==
=== Origin and early legal action ===
American Atheists was founded in 1963 by Madalyn Murray O'Hair as the Society of Separationists, after the legal cases Abington School District v. Schempp and Murray v. Curlett (1959) were filed. (These were consolidated before being heard on appeal by the US Supreme Court.) Both Schempp and Murray challenged mandatory prayer in public schools. Over the years American Atheists has filed numerous lawsuits against public institutions considered to have breached the constitutional separation between church and state. The organization, which has over 3,500 members, is headquartered in Cranford, New Jersey.

In 1959, Murray filed a case on behalf of her son, William J. Murray, who was being forced to attend Bible readings in school. He was harassed by teachers and school administrators for refusing to participate.

The consolidated case, usually cited as Abington School District v. Schempp, was argued before the United States Supreme Court on February 27 and 28, 1963.

In her opening statement, Madalyn Murray said, in part:

"Your petitioners are atheists and they define their beliefs as follows. An atheist loves his fellow man instead of god. An atheist believes that heaven is something for which we should work now – here on earth for all men together to enjoy. An atheist believes that he can get no help through prayer but that he must find in himself the inner conviction and strength to meet life, to grapple with it, to subdue it, and enjoy it. An atheist believes that only in a knowledge of himself and a knowledge of his fellow man can he find the understanding that will help to a life of fulfillment. He seeks to know himself and his fellow man rather than to know a god. An atheist believes that a hospital should be built instead of a church. An atheist believes that a deed must be done instead of a prayer said. An atheist strives for involvement in life and not escape into death. He wants disease conquered, poverty vanquished, war eliminated. He wants man to understand and love man. He wants an ethical way of life. He believes that we cannot rely on a god or channel action into prayer nor hope for an end of troubles in a hereafter. He believes that we are our brother's keepers and are keepers of our own lives; that we are responsible persons and the job is here and the time is now."

The justices rendered their decision on June 17, 1963. It was in favor of the petitioners, 8–1. They ruled that state-mandated prayer and unison bible readings in public schools were a violation of the Establishment Clause in the First Amendment to the United States Constitution. Justice Potter Stewart was the sole dissenter.

=== Leadership ===
O'Hair (1963–1995)

In 1976, Anne Nicol Gaylor and her daughter, Annie Laurie Gaylor, left American Atheists to found the Freedom From Religion Foundation, in response to O'Hair's antisemitism.

On August 27, 1995, Madalyn, Jon and Robin O'Hair disappeared from the organization's former Austin, Texas, headquarters, along with over $550,000 of the organization's funds. The three were later found to have been abducted, robbed and murdered by David Waters, an ex-convict and former employee.

Johnson (1995–2008)

Ellen Johnson succeeded O'Hair as president. Johnson was among the featured speakers at the Godless Americans March on Washington on November 2, 2002. That same year, American Atheists took Wildwood, Florida, to court for "displaying religious decorations at City Hall."

The group held their 30th annual national convention in 2004, attracting several best-selling atheist authors and leaders from other secular organizations.

American Atheists helped organize a 2006 campaign against the "no atheists in foxholes" claim. Master Sgt. Kathleen Johnson, founder of the Military Association of Atheists and Freethinkers, maintained that many "people manage to serve without having to call on a higher power." The U.S. Department of Veterans Affairs eventually approved the logo of the American Atheists to be an "emblem of belief" for placement on government headstones and markers.

In May 2007, ABC News featured a report on treatment of the Smalkowski family, declared atheists, by school officials in their small town of Hardesty, Oklahoma. The report said that American Atheists had filed a lawsuit on behalf of the Smalkowski family. The lawsuit alleges the Hardesty Public School District violated Nicole Smalkowski's constitutional rights with bullying behavior, trumped-up charges, and suspension from the school basketball team. Also that May, Joe Zamecki of American Atheists organized a local demonstration at the state capitol building in Austin, Texas, against the National Day of Prayer.

The organization announced via its blog on May 2, 2008, that Johnson was leaving the presidency of American Atheists for unspecified reasons. It was later revealed that her removal was not voluntary.

Buckner (2008–2010)

Following the May 2008 appointment of Frank Zindler as interim president, Ed Buckner was appointed president in September 2008 and remained in the position until September 2010.

Silverman (2010–2018)

David Silverman became president in September 2010, until his termination in April 2018, following an internal investigation over allegations of sexual assaults and financial conflicts.

Nick Fish (2018 to present)

Following the May 2018 appointment of Ed Buckner as Interim Executive Director, Nick Fish became president in September 2018.

=== Godless Americans PAC ===
In November 2005, the Godless Americans Political Action Committee (GAPAC), an American PAC, was formed by American Atheists to endorse political candidates who support the separation of church and state. According to the Los Angeles Times, atheists subsequently have become more outspoken about being an ignored voice in the United States.

The PAC officially states it does not want government to associate with religion in any way. It opposes Christmas being a federal holiday or any mention of God on currency or in the Pledge of Allegiance.

=== Atheist monument ===
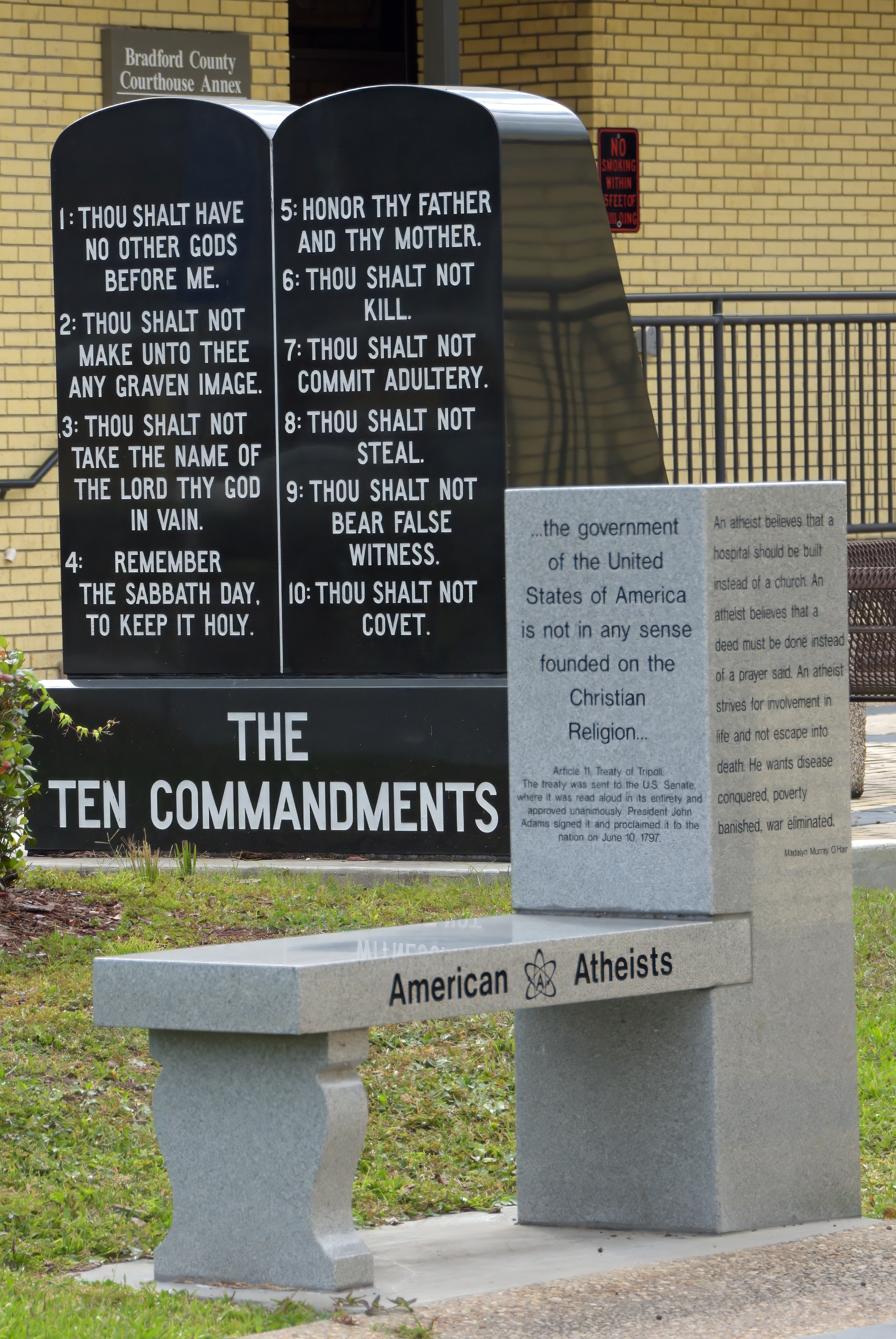
American Atheist bench and Ten Commandments display

In May 2013 the American Atheists settled with Bradford County, Florida, regarding a monument containing the Ten Commandments. The American Atheists would be allowed to place their own monument onto public property. This marked the first time that such a monument was placed on public land. The monument is being furnished by American Atheists via a grant from the Stiefel Freethought Foundation.

=== Billboards ===
The American Atheists organization is known for its controversial antireligious billboards, intended by the organization to draw out closeted atheists within religious groups. A billboard on the Brooklyn-Queens Expressway displaying the Hebrew Tetragrammaton erected after the celebration of the Jewish holy day of Purim caused outrage from many Jews. The same billboard was rejected by a landowner in an Orthodox Jewish neighborhood, which drew a reaction from American Atheists' president David Silverman, who stated that this was a case of religious bigotry.

A satirical billboard depicting the Nativity during the Christmas season was also erected in 2010, causing a reaction from many American Christians, including the construction of a counter-billboard by the Catholic League. A billboard in Paterson, New Jersey, with the name of Allah in Arabic and the words "You know it's a myth and you have a choice" drew criticism from local Muslims who "felt it was disrespectful and insulting but they agreed that the American Atheists have the right to put up their billboards where they want."

=== AtheistTV ===
On July 29, 2014, at a New York launch party, the group revealed an Internet television channel called AtheistTV on the Roku streaming media platform, showing a 24-hour live stream of programming alongside an on-demand service. The President of American Atheists, David Silverman, explained that the new channel would "...provide a breadth of content, from science to politics to comedy, all centered around our common freedom from religion." AtheistTV became only the second atheist channel on Roku, but it was the first atheist channel with both live and on-demand video content. Roku hosts over 400 religious channels.

== Court cases ==
American Atheists have won several cases involving the separation of church and state. It continues to file lawsuits to challenge what it considers abuses of separation of church and state.

- Murray v. Curlett (1963) Challenged bible reading and prayer recitation in Maryland public schools.
- Murray v. United States (1964) Sought to gain equal time with religious organizations under the Fairness Doctrine established by the Federal Communications Commission
- Murray v. Nixon (1970) Challenged weekly religious services in the White House.
- O'Hair v. Paine (1971) Challenged NASA's requirement that astronauts read the bible during a space flight.
- O'Hair v. Cooke (1977) Challenged the Austin, Texas, city council's practice of having a prayer read before its public meetings.
- O'Hair v. Blumenthal (1978) Challenged the inclusion of the phrase "In God We Trust" on U.S. currency.
- O'Hair v. Hill (1978) Sought to have the Texas state constitution amended to repeal a provision requiring persons holding offices of public trust to believe in God.
- O'Hair v. Andrus (1979) Challenged the use of National Park facilities for the Pope to hold a Roman Catholic mass on the Mall in Washington, D.C.
- O'Hair v. Clements (1980) Challenged the Texas legislature's practice of displaying a nativity scene in the rotunda of the capitol building in Austin, Texas.
- Carter, et al. v Broadlawns Medical Center, et al. (1984–1987) Challenged the hiring by the Polk County Hospital of a chaplain, US Sup Ct, cert den.
- Steel Crosses on Utah Highways (2005)
- Society of Separationists vs. Pleasant Grove (2004)
- American Atheists vs. Starke, Florida.(2005)
- Society of Separationists vs. Pleasant Grove (2004)
- American Atheists, Inc., and Steve Walker vs. City of Detroit, City of Detroit Downtown Development Authority, and Detroit Economic Growth Corporation.
- Clyde Baxley, Grace Brown, Edward Byford, Bill Jager, Al Sundquist, James Woolever, Arlen Acharias, and Dorothy Anne Zappa Vs. State of Alaska.
- American Atheists Inc., Mark W. Butler v. The City of Jacksonville, Florida (2006) (Sued for the city's tax-funded "Faith Day")
- Chester Smalkowski, Nadia Smalkowski, American Atheists v. Hardesty Public School District, The County Of Texas County, Oklahoma, The Town Of Hardesty, Oklahoma. (Filed August 2006)
- American Atheists Inc., Lon Bevill, v. City Of Stark, Florida. (2007)
- American Atheists Inc., Edwin Kagin, v. Kentucky Office of Homeland Security (2009)
- American Atheists Inc., Daniel Cooney, v. Bradford County, Florida (2012) Filed suit over a display of the Ten Commandments on public property. Went to mediation. Resolved with a monument designed by American Atheists.
- American Atheists v. Port Authority (2011) Filed suit against the placement of cross-shaped steel beams called the "World Trade Center Cross" at the National September 11 Memorial and Museum. On March 28, 2013, United States District Court Judge Deborah Batts granted a motion of judgment in favor of the defendant. American Atheists stated at the time that they would appeal this decision.

== Presidents ==
Name	Term of Office
Nick Fish	2018–present
David Silverman	2010–2018
Ed Buckner	2008–2010
Frank Zindler	2008 (interim)
Ellen Johnson	1995–2008
Jon Garth Murray	1986–1995 (de jure)
Madalyn Murray O'Hair	1963–1986 (de jure); 1986–1995 (de facto)

== See also ==
- A Secular Humanist Declaration
- Charles E. Stevens American Atheist Library and Archives
- Discrimination against atheists in the United States
- List of secularist organizations
- The Atheist Experience
- Godless Americans March on Washington
- Secular Student Alliance
- Humanist Canada
- Freedom From Religion Foundation
- RM-2493
