= World Trade Center cross =

9/11-related historical artefact

Coordinates: 40.7114°N 74.0122°W

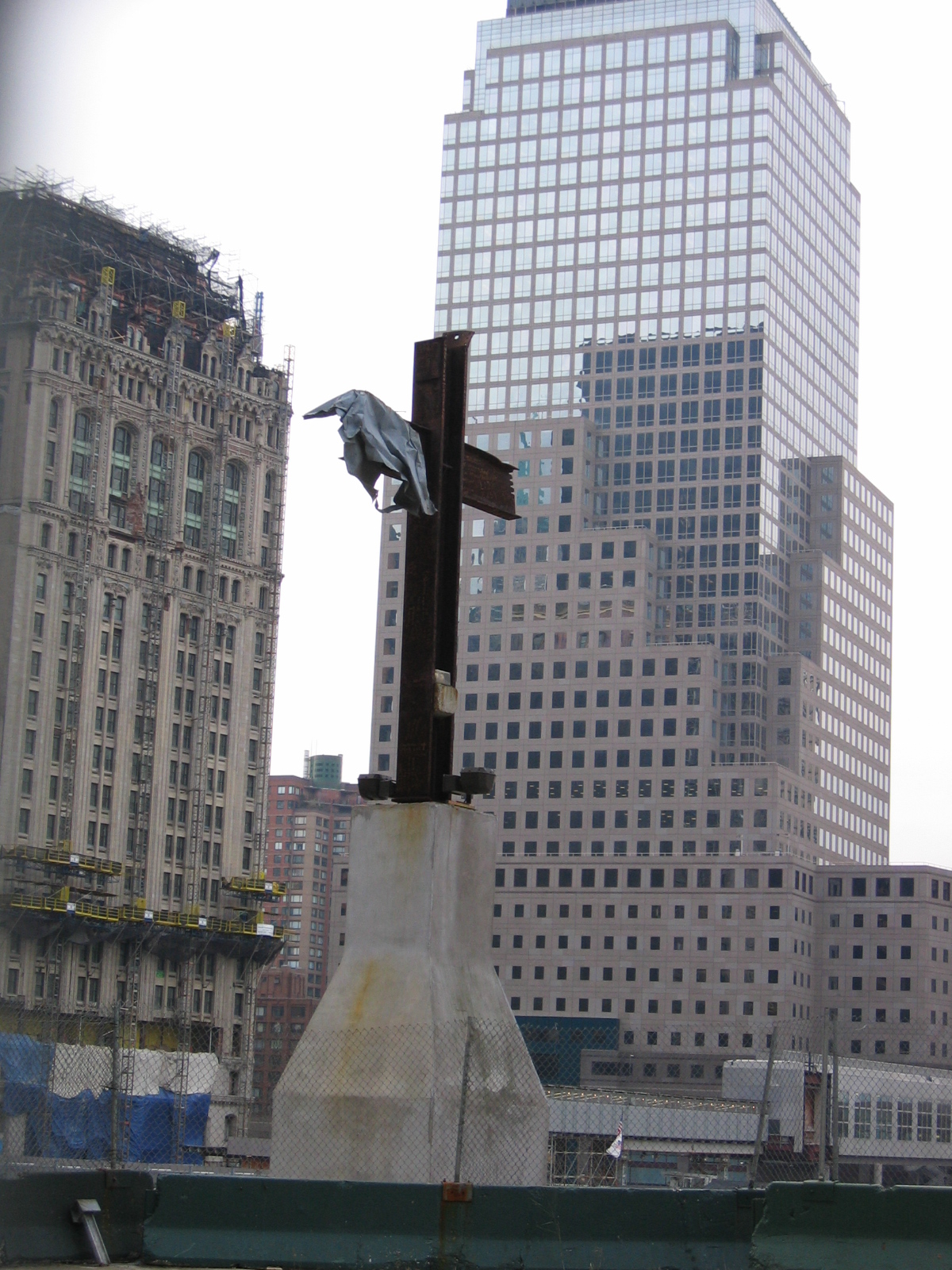
The cross installed on a pedestal at Ground Zero (2004)

The World Trade Center cross, also known as the Ground Zero cross, is a formation of steel beams found among the debris of the World Trade Center site in Lower Manhattan, New York City, following the September 11 attacks in 2001. This set of beams is named for its resemblance to the proportions of a Christian cross. Since 2014, the beams have been part of an exhibit at the September 11 Museum.

== Context ==
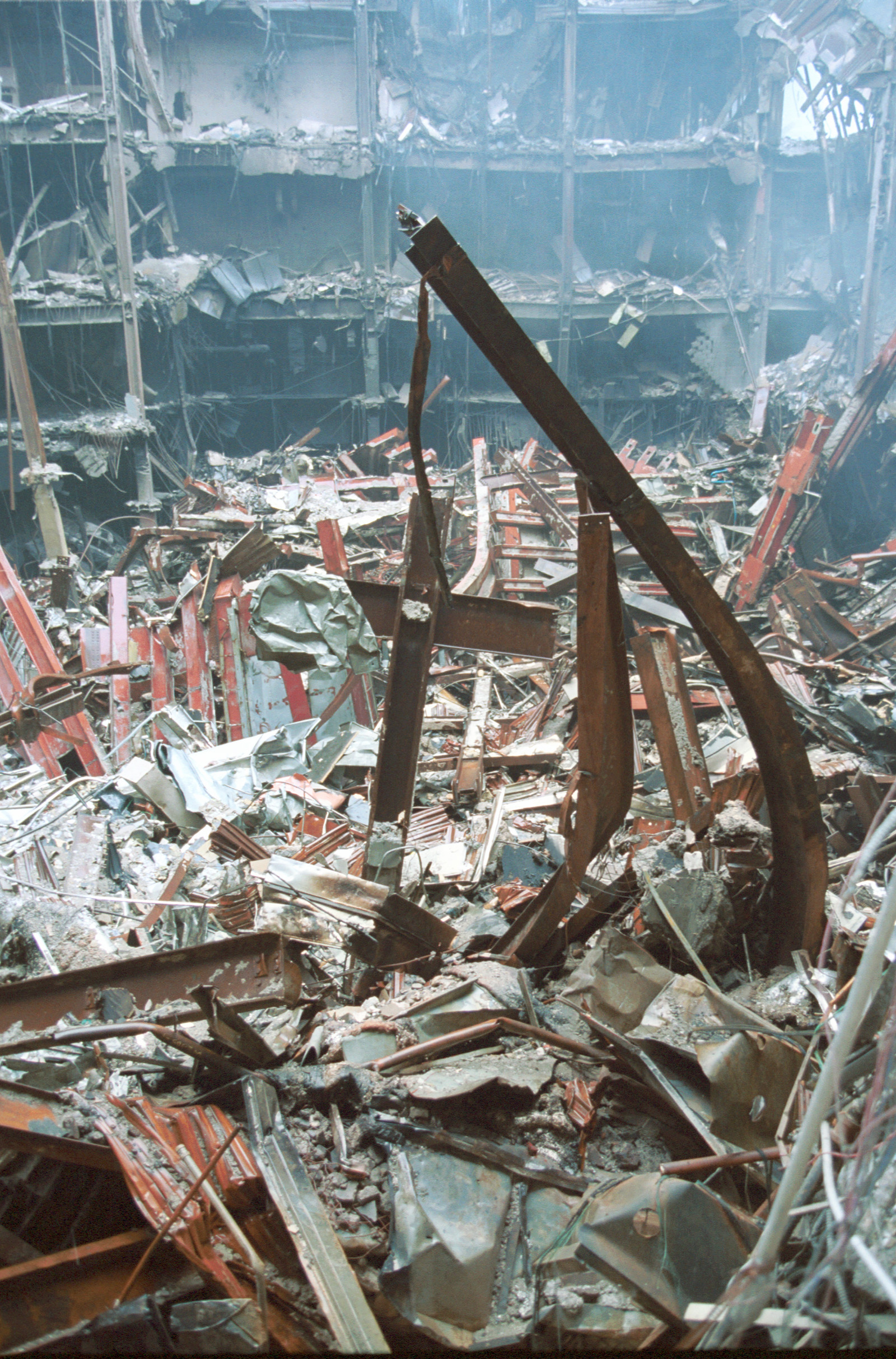
The Cross after 9/11.

The World Trade Center was built using prefabricated parts which were bolted or welded together at the site. This process dramatically reduced construction time and costs. Using this process, t-beams and other types of cross beams were created and used in each of the World Trade Center buildings. The collapse of the Twin Towers sent debris down onto 6 World Trade Center, and gutted the interior of that building; the intact cross beam later found in 6 World Trade Center's debris is believed to have come from the North Tower.

Following the terrorist attacks, a massive operation was launched to clear the site and attempt to find any survivors amongst the rubble. On September 13, 2001, a worker at the site named Frank Silecchia discovered a 20-foot (6.1 m) cross of two steel beams amongst the debris of 6 World Trade Center. Those with access to the site used the cross as a shrine of sorts, leaving messages on it or praying before it. After a few weeks within the cleanup site the cross was an impediment to nearby work, so Silecchia and others working on the project received an expedited approval from the office of New York Mayor Rudy Giuliani to erect it on a pedestal on a portion of the former plaza on Church Street near Liberty. It was moved by crane on October 3 and installed on October 4, where it continued as a shrine and tourist attraction.

=== Location during construction ===
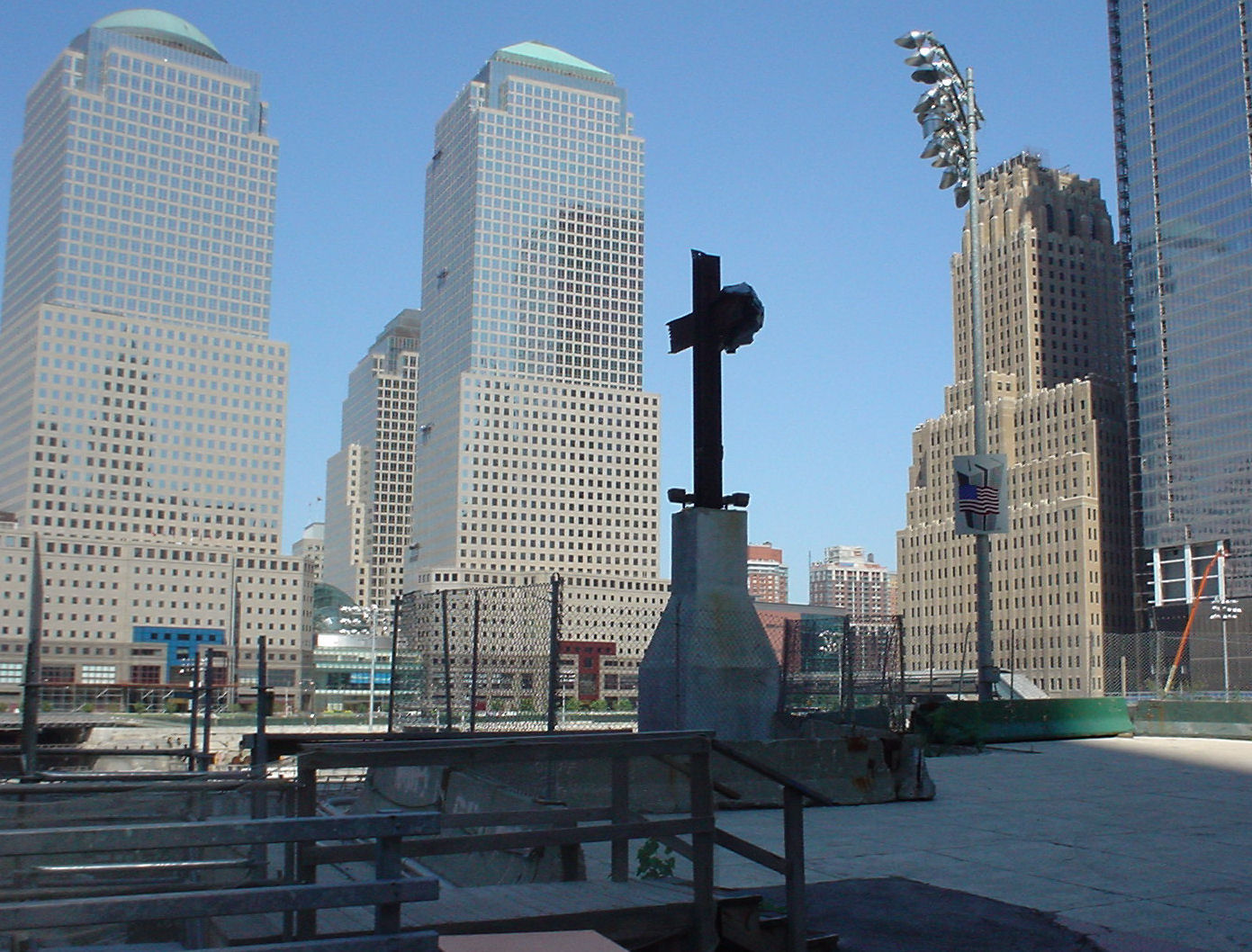
The World Trade Center cross in 2005.

The cross remained during reconstruction, but in the 2004 and 2005 filings of its site plan, the Port Authority of New York and New Jersey indicated that "additional remnants" of the original World Trade Center might require removal and storage during construction of the World Trade Center Transportation Hub. Father Brian Jordan OFM, a Roman Catholic Franciscan priest, has been trying to preserve the cross since April 2006. St. Peter's Church, which faces the World Trade Center site, was proposed as a temporary spot for relocation during construction of the new PATH World Trade Center Transportation Hub and office tower at the site. The cross was eventually moved to St. Peter's on October 5, 2006, and sat on the Church Street side of the building, between Barclay and Vesey streets, bearing a plaque reading "The Cross at Ground Zero – Founded September 13, 2001; Blessed October 4, 2001; Temporarily Relocated October 5, 2006. Will return to WTC Museum, a sign of comfort for all."

== Final location ==
On July 23, 2011, the cross was blessed by Fr. Jordan during a short ceremony before being loaded on a flatbed truck, moved back to Ground Zero and lowered into the National September 11 Memorial & Museum (due to being a large-scale artifact), before the rest of the museum displays were filled in.

== Cultural response ==
=== Religious symbolism ===
Many saw the crossed metal as a Christian cross and felt its survival was symbolic. Fr. Jordan spoke over it and declared it to be a "symbol of hope... [a] symbol of faith... [a] symbol of healing". One minister at the site says that when a family of a man who died in the attacks came to the cross shrine and left personal effects there, "It was as if the cross took in the grief and loss. I never felt Jesus more."

In 2013, "U.S. District Judge Deborah Batts concluded...that the 17-foot-high cross, which became a spiritual symbol for workers at ground zero, does not amount to an endorsement of Christianity." Joseph Daniels, the president and CEO of the National September 11 Memorial & Museum at the World Trade Center Foundation, welcomed the court decision to continue the display of the cross, stating it "is in fact a crucial part of the 9/11 Memorial Museum's mission." Furthermore, Mark Alcott, the lawyer of the National September 11 Memorial & Museum at the World Trade Center Foundation, which fought the court case against the American Atheists, stated that "The museum is gratified by the decision."

The potential use of the cross in the National September 11 Memorial & Museum has been controversial. Many groups such as families of certain Christian victims want the cross to be included. Other organizations disagree, notably the American Atheists, who filed the lawsuit pertaining to this issue. The Anti-Defamation League, a Jewish NGO, issued a statement that it "fully supports the inclusion in the National September 11 Memorial & Museum of the metal beams in the shape of a cross found in the rubble at Ground Zero in the aftermath of the tragic attacks on 9/11." In the court decision in March 2013, Judge Deborah Batts opined that "the First Amendment separates church from state, but not religion from public life" and that "American Atheists advocates an 'absolute separation of church and state,' which would appear to call for a society in which public spaces are entirely religion-free zones. But 'separation' taken this far is no friend of religious liberty." In late July 2014, in dismissing a lawsuit filed by the dissenting atheists who did not want the cross displayed at the memorial, the 2nd U.S. Circuit ruled that, being "a symbol of hope" and "historical in nature", the steel beams "did not intentionally discriminate" against the atheists.

=== Replicas ===
A replica has been installed at the gravesite of Father Mychal Judge, a New York City Fire Department chaplain and the first public safety casualty of the day, who was killed in the collapse of the World Trade Center. Other surviving crossbeams were salvaged from the rubble; one was given to a Far Rockaway, Queens, chapter of the Knights of Columbus in 2004. Another replica cross was fashioned by ironworkers from Trade Center steel and installed at Graymoor, the Upper West Side headquarters of the Society of the Atonement, a religious institute of Franciscan friars.

The nearby St. Paul's Chapel, which survived the destruction and was a refuge for survivors and site laborers, sells various replicas of the cross including lapel pins and rosaries. The cross even inspired laborers on "The Pile" to get tattoos.

New York City fire fighters donated a memorial made from a steel cross from the World Trade Center and mounted atop a platform shaped like the Pentagon to the Shanksville Volunteer Fire Department. Hundreds of firefighters riding motorcycles escorted the beams from New York City to Shanksville. It was installed outside the firehouse on August 25, 2008.

An iron cross from the World Trade Center site was installed at the Church of the Good Shepherd (New York City) in 2002.

Iron cross recovered from the World Trade Center after the September 11 attack at Church of the Good Shepherd (New York City)

=== In popular culture ===
A documentary film titled The Cross and the Towers, which was released in 2006, tells the story of the 9/11 World Trade Center Cross. It has won a "number of awards, including the Audience Choice Award at Palm Beach International Festival, Best Film at Gloria Film Festival, Crystal Heart at Heartland Film Festival and finalist in the USA FilmFestival.

== See also ==
- Coventry Cross of Nails
- National September 11 Memorial & Museum
