= Ellen Johnson =

American atheist activist (born 1955)

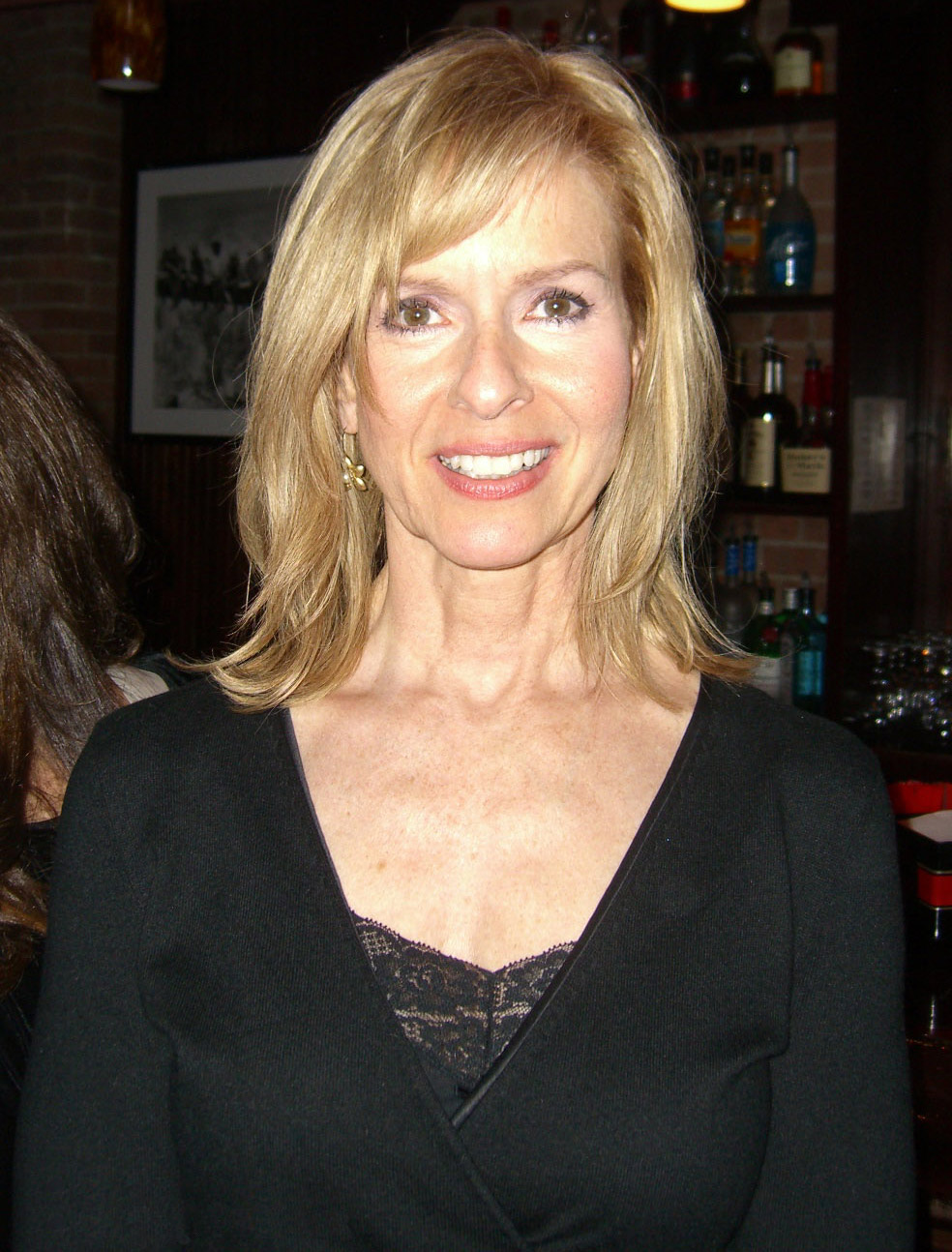
- Johnson at the Great American God-Out in Manhattan on November 15, 2007

President of American Atheists
- In office 1995–2008
- Preceded by: Jon Garth Murray
- Succeeded by: Frank Zindler

Personal details
- Born: 1955 (age 70–71)

Ellen Johnson (born 1955) is an American activist for the civil rights of atheists and for the separation of church and state in the United States. She served as the president of the organization American Atheists from 1995 to 2008.

== Early life ==
Ellen Johnson was born in the United States in 1955. She describes herself as a lifelong "second-generation atheist". Her educational background consists of bachelor's degrees in environmental studies and political science and a master's degree in political science from The New School for Social Research. She is married with two children.

== Career ==
Johnson has been active in the American Atheists organization since 1978. She took over as president in 1995 after founder Madalyn Murray O'Hair went missing along with her son and granddaughter. (They were later found to have been abducted and murdered by two ex-convicts, one of whom, David Waters, worked for her organization.)

In November 2002, Johnson announced the formation of the Godless Americans Political Action Committee (GAMPAC), a PAC to endorse political candidates who support the separation of church and state. She is the executive director of that organization. The PAC has since renamed itself as "Enlighten the Vote".

Starting in 1994, she was the co-host of The Atheist Viewpoint, a television program which was available as of 2003 "on dozens of cable systems throughout the nation and on the Internet."

On December 20, 2005, she appeared on an ABC special, "Heaven – Where Is It? How Do We Get There?", for which she was interviewed by Barbara Walters. She appeared on Larry King Live in April 2005, Good Morning America in December 2005, MSNBC's Scarborough Country on December 14, 2004, and appeared on Fox News three times in November and December 2003, and MSNBC's Phil Donahue.

On May 2, 2008, it was announced on the American Atheists blog that Johnson was leaving her post as president. On May 7, 2008, it was made public that Ellen Johnson was removed involuntarily by a vote of the board of directors. The reason was not revealed. She was succeeded by Frank Zindler.

Preceded by Madalyn Murray O'Hair (de facto); Jon Garth Murray (de jure) (Jon Garth Murray held office as President in 1986 but Murray O'Hair, who was de jure President from its founding in 1963 until 1986, remained de facto President until both their murders in 1995)	President of American Atheists; 1995–2008	Succeeded by Frank Zindler
