= Ed Buckner =

American atheist activist

President of American Atheists
- In office 2008–2010
- Preceded by: Frank Zindler
- Succeeded by: David Silverman

Edward Milton Buckner (born March 8, 1946) is an American atheist activist who served as president of the organization American Atheists from 2008 to 2010. He was succeeded in this post by David Silverman.

== Career ==
Buckner served as executive director for the Council for Secular Humanism from 2001 to 2003 and was once the council's southern director. As treasurer of the Atlanta Freethought Society, he led a protest at a 2007 rally organized by Georgia Governor Sonny Perdue to pray for rain. Buckner is currently a national board member for American Atheists.

Buckner and his son, Michael E. Buckner, wrote In Freedom We Trust: An Atheist Guide to Religious Liberty published by Prometheus Books in late 2012.

Buckner was born in Fitzgerald, Georgia to an Episcopal clergyman father. He received his B.A. from Rice University in 1967 and his M. Ed. and Ph.D. (in educational leadership, 1983) from Georgia State University. Dr. Buckner married his wife Lois Diane Bright Buckner in 1968, and the two gave birth to their child Michael Edward Buckner in 1970. Buckner was on the debate and football teams at Clear Creek High School (League City, Texas); though he left the h.s. in 1963 to attend Rice, he came back to graduate from CCHS in 1964.

Dr. Buckner has traveled across the United States and into the United Kingdom, voicing his support regarding freethought, secular humanism and the separation of state and church. Ed Buckner's specialized topics in his presentations as a public speaker include "In Freedom We Trust" (debunking the notion of the United States being a Christian nation), "Atheism, Not Godliness" (providing support for atheism), "Secularism Across America" (a discussion regarding national organizations and their relationships between one another) among others. He is currently available for public speaking requests under Secular Student Alliance, an educational non-profit organization. He has appeared often in the media circle as well, defending the civil liberties of Atheists and the separation of state and church on notable news outlets including CBS Evening News, Fox News, the Michael Medved Show, CNN, and the national CBS Radio News.

Buckner, in May 2013, discovered Bibles in a cabin in a Georgia State Park. He responded by having atheist literature donated to be available alongside the bibles.

Dr. Buckner has affiliations with many organizations that include the American Civil Liberties Union, the American United for Separation of Church and State, the Council for Secular Humanism, the Democratic Party and Freedom From Religion Foundation.

== Selected bibliography ==
Buckner has contributed to the following books:

- Quotations that Support the Separation of Church and State
- Buckner, Edward M. (2003). "Winning the Battle Royal". In Blaker, Kimberley (ed.). Fundamentals of Extremism: The Christian Right in America. New Boston Books. ISBN 9780972549608.
- Flynn, Tom, ed. (2007). The New Encyclopedia of Unbelief. Prometheus Books. ISBN 9781591023913. (several entries)
- Ideas conservadoras y Trabajo Social (original title: An Empirical Analysis of the Attitudes of Social Workers in the United States), published in Revista Trabajo Social, No. 55 (1988), pages 52–57. Co-written with Howard Epstein
- Revista Trabajo Social - Chilean social work journal.
- Urban Schools: A New Era? - Urban Resources, Vol. 2, No. 2 (Winter 1985), on pages 51–53.
- By Their ZIP Codes Shall Ye Know Them, in Beyond 1984—Proceedings: Seventh Annual Conference of the So thern Future Society (Ermel Stepp, Jr., ed.) Huntington Beach, West Virginia: Marshall University, 1985, pp. 83–85.

== Miscellaneous ==
Dr. Buckner was honored with an award for excellence in teaching by the Georgia State University Foundation in two years, 1980–1981 and 1983–1984. He was elected to College of Public and Urban Affairs Executive Committee, from 1983 to 1985. He was elected as Senator for Urban Studies Department, Georgia State University Senate, for the 1985–1986 term. He co-edited Taking the Harder Right by Oliver G. Halle with his wife Diane. He resides in his home in Atlanta, Georgia. On his tenure as President of American Atheists, Dr. Ed. Buckner participated in the "Islam or Atheism: You Decide!" debate on June 22, 2010 in London, England. He also stated after the debate that he remains convinced that Islam is not supportable nor a rational belief.

His past positions included—Researcher for a public school system, an Assistant Professor of Urban Studies, College of Public and Urban Affairs, Georgia State University. Taught research methods, statistics/computer use, and graduate statistical analysis courses—including bivariate and multivariate statistics. Responsible for managing and conducting wide variety of research and for analysis of data resulting from research projects. Served as a consultant on statistics, SPSSX computer programs and more.

Preceded by Frank Zindler	President of American Atheists; 2008–2010	Succeeded by David Silverman
