= Reason Rally =

Public gathering

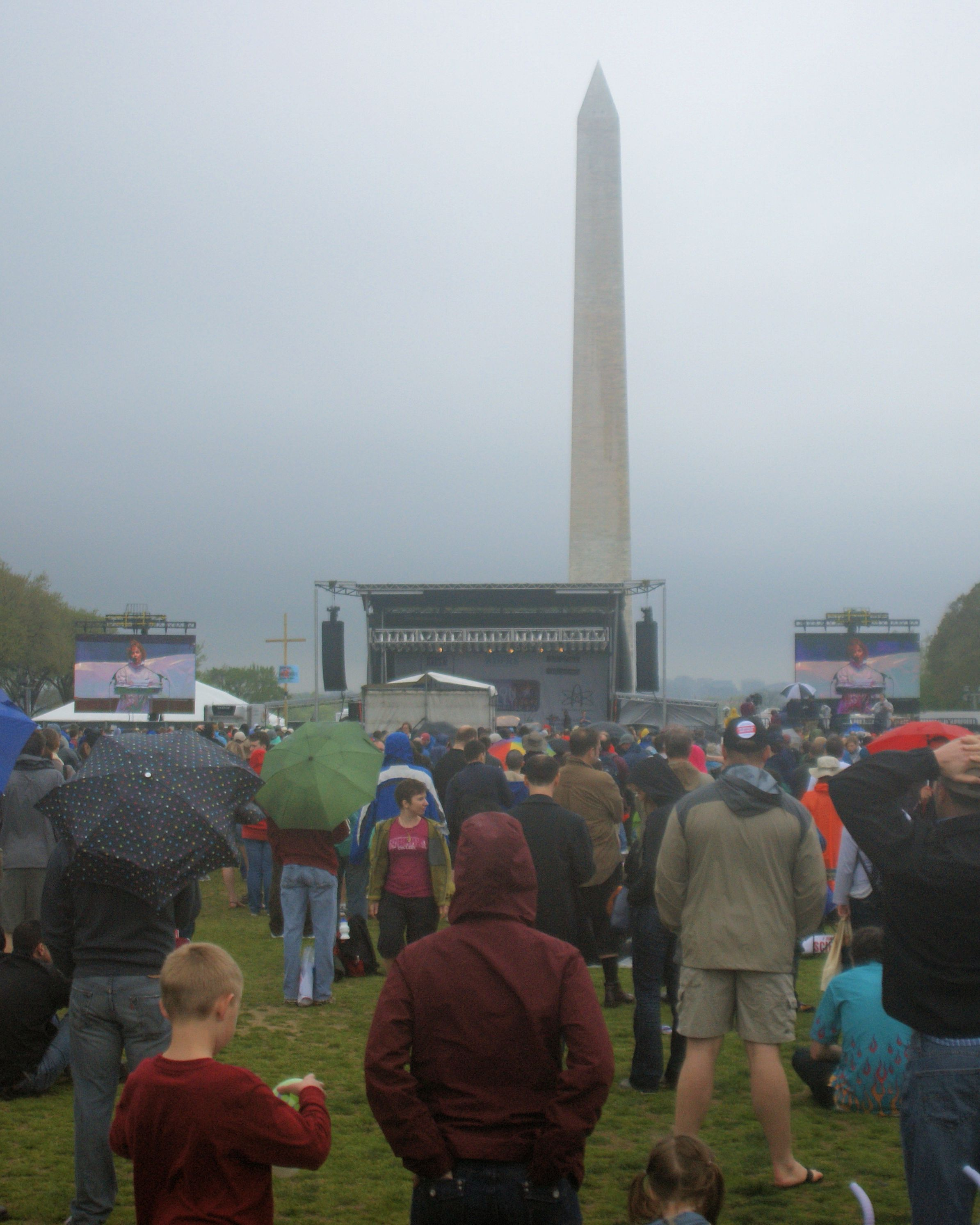
Atheists and irreligious people gathered for the Reason Rally on the National Mall

The first Reason Rally was a public gathering for secularism and religious skepticism held on the National Mall in Washington, D.C., on March 24, 2012. The rally was sponsored by major atheistic and secular organizations of the United States and was regarded as a "Woodstock for atheists and skeptics". A second Reason Rally was held June 4, 2016 at the Lincoln Memorial in Washington, D.C.

Speakers and performers at the first rally included biologist Richard Dawkins, physicist Lawrence M. Krauss, musician Tim Minchin, MythBusters co-host Adam Savage, actor-comedian Eddie Izzard, Paul Provenza, PZ Myers, Jessica Ahlquist, Dan Barker, and magician James Randi, and others. The punk rock band Bad Religion performed and other notables (Rep. Pete Stark, Sen. Tom Harkin, comedian Bill Maher, magician Penn Jillette) addressed the crowd by video link. Participants recited the Pledge of Allegiance, deliberately omitting the phrase "under God", which was added by the U.S. Congress in 1954. Veterans of the U.S. Armed Forces were represented, and a retired Army colonel, Kirk Lamb, led veterans in an affirmation of their secular military oaths. Speakers urged those assembled to contact local and national representatives and ask them to support church-state separation, science education, marriage equality for gays and lesbians, and ending government support of faith-based organizations, among other causes.

According to the official website of the first rally, the aim of the Reason Rally was to "unify, energize, and embolden secular people nationwide, while dispelling the negative opinions held by so much of American society." The website had predicted it would be "the largest secular event in world history." The Atlantic said 20,000 people were in attendance. Religion News Service said 8,000–10,000. The documentary The Unbelievers says that over 30,000 people attended the rally. There are no official crowd estimates of events on the Mall.

The second Reason Rally (2016) was billed as "a celebration of fact-driven public policy, the value of critical thinking, and the voting power of secular Americans". The weekend of the Rally included advocacy events and conference sessions, while the crowd attending the rally itself numbered around 15,000 according to organizers.

== 2012 Reason Rally ==
=== Goals and planning ===
The rally's official website outlined three main goals:

- To encourage attendees (and those who couldn’t attend) to come "out of the closet" as secular Americans, or supporters of secular equality.
- To dispel stereotypes ("there is no one 'True Atheist' "). Participation by non-theists of all political persuasions, ethnicities, genders, and backgrounds was encouraged. The intent was to show that there are secular Americans in every major demographic.
- Legislative equality. Secular Americans should be permitted to run for public office and adequately represent non-theists, just as theists in office represent their constituents. Non-theists deserve a seat at the table just as theists do; the rally should put secular values "on the radar" of American voters.

David Silverman was the creator and executive producer of the event, and the president of the Reason Rally Coalition. Organizers said the aim of the rally was twofold: to unite individuals with similar beliefs and to show the American public that the number of people who don’t believe in God is large and growing. “We have the numbers to be taken seriously,” said Paul Fidalgo, spokesman for the Center for Inquiry, which promotes the scientific method and reasoning and was one of the organizations sponsoring the rally. “We’re not just a tiny fringe group.”

According to rally spokesman Jesse Galef, diversity with the attendees was a focus this year, he stated 'We can't succeed if we are only coming from one demographic'". Comparing the 2012 rally to the 2002 Godless rally which was mainly over-40 white men, the attendees were "largely under the age of 30, at least half female and included many people of color".

Speaking to NPR prior to the rally, American Atheist president David Silverman stated that this is a coming-of-age event for atheists, "We'll look back at the Reason Rally as one of the game-changing events when people started to look at atheism and look at atheists in a different light".

With goals of bringing unity, energy, and visibility to the secular demographic, the rally can be seen as a manifestation of the secular movement that emerged in America and elsewhere in the first decade of the twenty-first century. Writing for The Guardian Sarah Posner states that the Reason Rally was modeled on the LGBT movement, encouraging people to 'come out' about their non-belief and working to humanize atheism by getting "people to personalize someone they'd always thought of as an 'other.'" Once people realize that their neighbor, co-worker or family member is an atheist it goes a long way towards acceptance. Politics played a large part of the Rally according to Posner; considering that there is only one openly atheist American Congressperson, there is a lot of work to still be done.

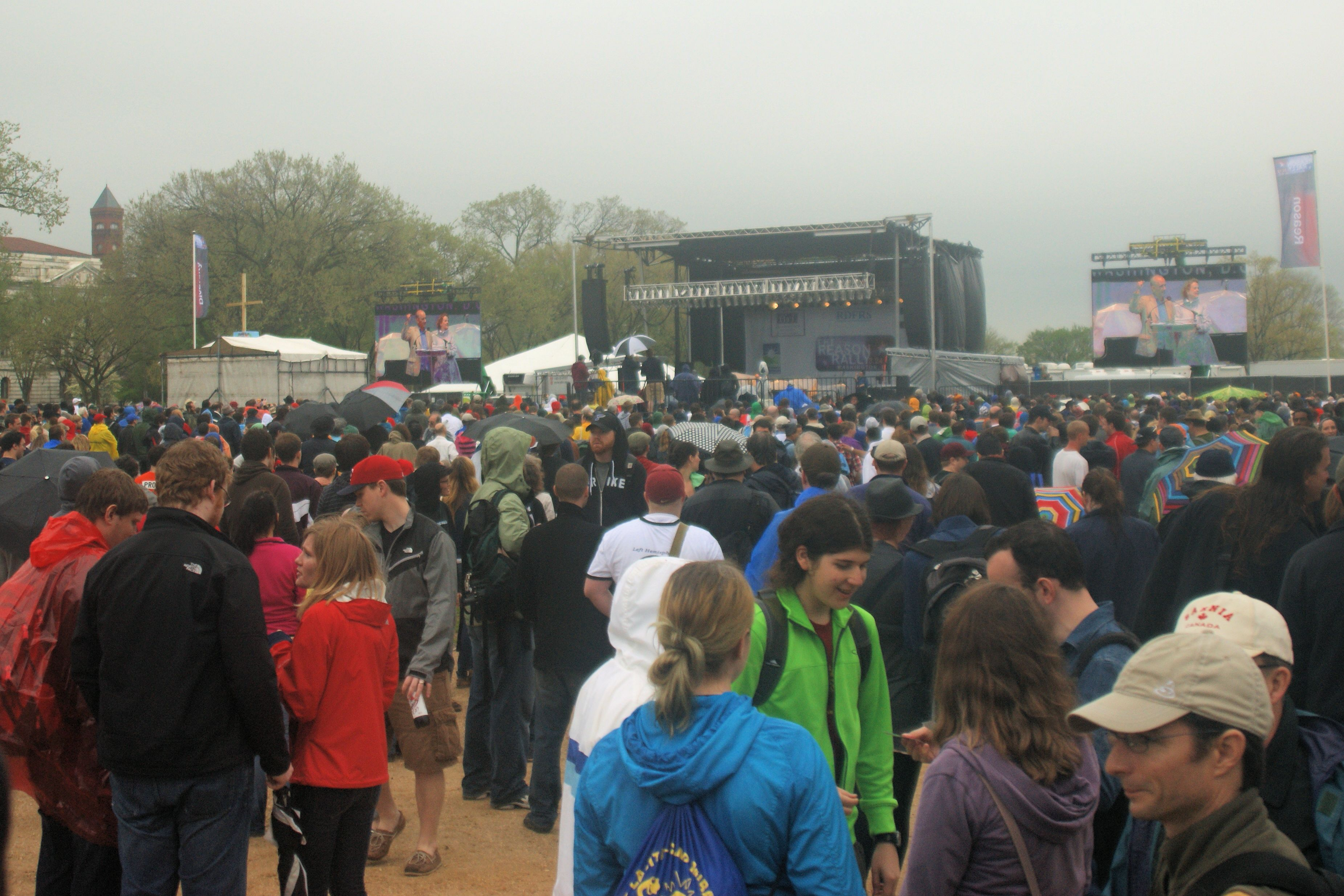
Reason Rally crowd

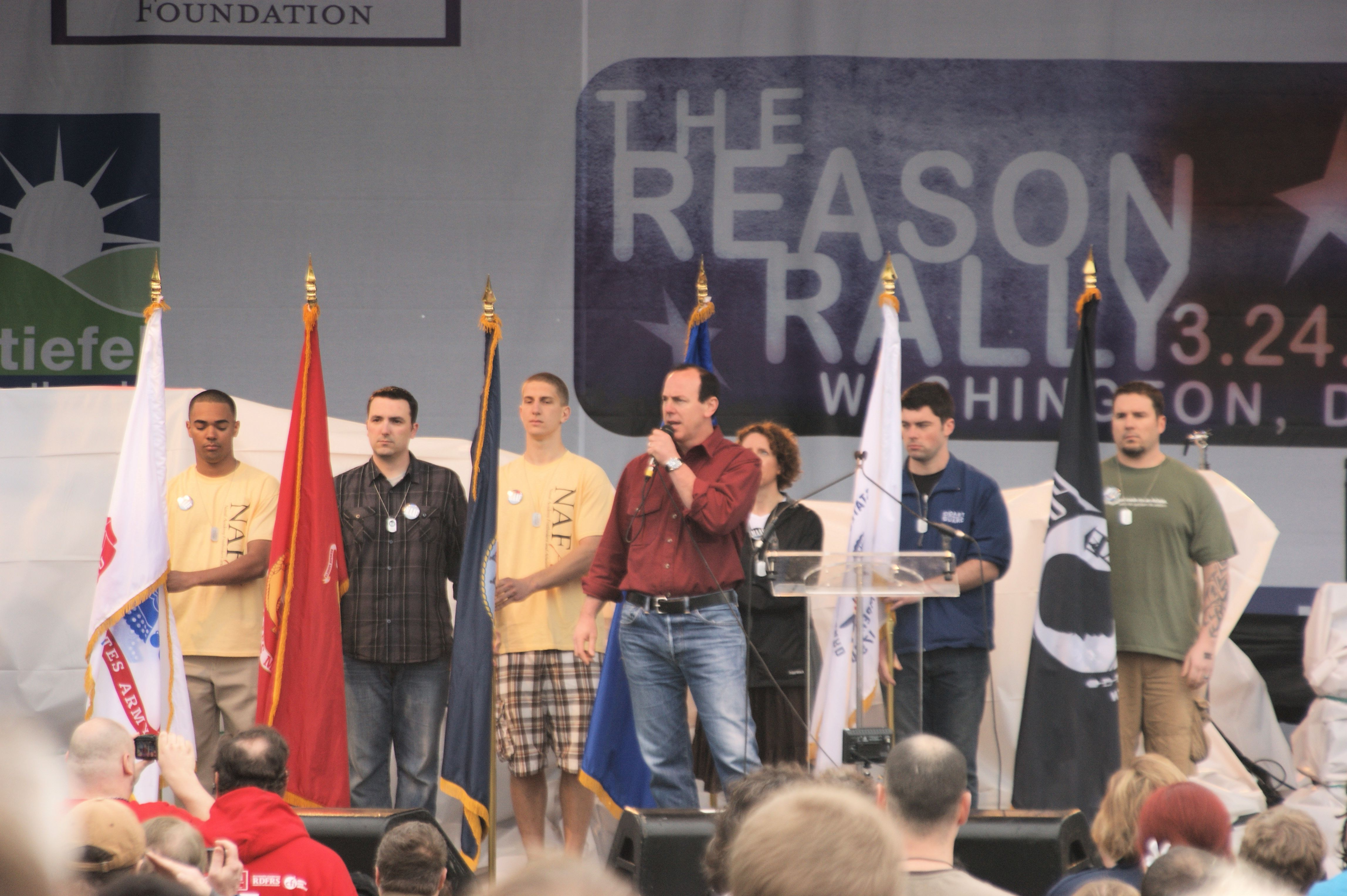
Greg Graffin of Bad Religion sings the National Anthem at the Reason Rally.

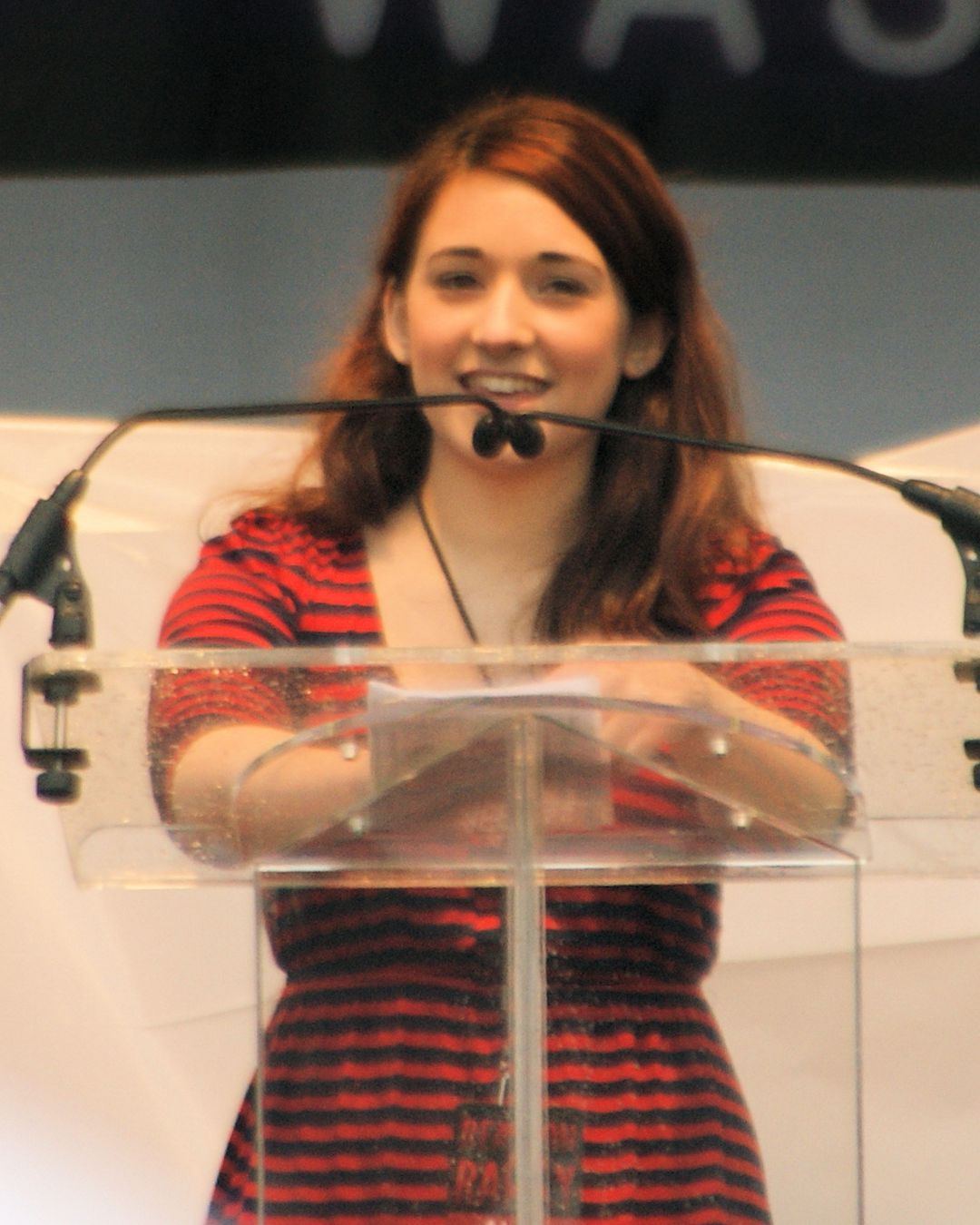
Jessica Ahlquist speaks at the Reason Rally

=== Support ===
In the Huffington Post, Staks Rosch praised the rally. He stated that atheists "face a great deal of discrimination and fear of discrimination for being outspoken" and that many "fear having their families disown them, losing their jobs, or simply being harassed by the religious."

David Niose, the president of the American Humanist Association stated that "The secular demographic does not claim to have a monopoly on rationality, but it does feel that it has something to offer. By rallying in Washington, seculars are not whining about some imagined victimization, but rather they are exercising a voice that has been silenced for too long."

Nate Phelps, an atheist and estranged son of Fred Phelps, the founder of the fringe group, Westboro Baptist Church, supported the Reason Rally and was among the event's speakers.

=== Criticism ===
The Reason Rally elicited criticism for the antitheist rhetoric and tone that some speakers employed. Editorial writers such as Nathalie Rothschild argued that "the combination of non-belief, self-victimisation and religion-bashing make for a pretty negative and weak ground for common identification". Tom Gilson at the Washington Post and Rabbi Brad Hirschfield of the National Jewish Center for Learning and Leadership wrote pieces critical of the event.

Some notable speakers of the atheist community like Richard Dawkins encouraged mockery and ridicule of religious people in his speech, which elicited a response from others. Though mockery of religion was not the aim of the rally, it happened quite often and was seen more than the positive portrayals of secularism.

=== Notable speaker quotes ===
- Paul Provenza stated “We're not here today to bash anyone's religion… but, hey, if it happens it happens.”
- Richard Dawkins spoke about the differences between the US and the UK, which does not have separation between church and state. "The American Constitution is a precious treasure, the envy of the world". He also stated "Mock them, ridicule them in public. Don't fall for the convention that we're all too polite to talk about religion. Religion makes specific claims about the Universe which need to be substantiated and challenged."
- Mythbuster Adam Savage stated "Everything that we have that makes our lives possible exists because human beings have... made predictions based on those tests and then improved upon them. This is reason: the human capacity to make sense of the world."
- David Silverman, president of American Atheists stated "If the atheists weren't closeted, it would be harder to hate us, because in the end, you can't hate what you already love."
- Magician Penn Jillette stated "I can make the argument...that the only ones with true morality are us, the atheists. We are doing good because it's good and are doing right because it's right, and not for reward or punishment. We have love for each other, we have community, we have charity."
- Bill Maher said, "When it comes to religion, we're not two sides of the same coin, and you don't get to put your unreason upon the same shelf with my reason. Your stuff [religion] has to go over there, on the shelf with Zeus, and Thor, and the Kraken. With the stuff that is not evidence based, stuff that religious people never change their mind about, no matter what happens."

== 2016 Reason Rally ==
The second quadrennial Reason Rally was held June 4, 2016 at the Lincoln Memorial in Washington, D.C. Event organizers were targeting an attendance of 30,000 people but the organizers estimated only 15,000 to 20,000 showed up and another source estimated even less actually came to the rally.

The 2016 Reason Rally was billed as "a celebration of fact-driven public policy, the value of critical thinking, and the voting power of secular Americans". The weekend of the Rally included advocacy events and conference sessions.

One of the featured speakers at the rally was John de Lancie. Speaking in reference to his Star Trek character Q, de Lancie said:

My name is John de Lancie, and I am a god. At least, I've played one on TV. And I'm here to tell you as a god that I was created by humans. And the words I spoke were written by men and women ... My creators took great care in exalting me to the position I hold today. And just like all the gods before me—Zeus, Baal, Yahweh—my god creators wanted you to believe that I am the omnipotent one. The alpha and the omega… Truth be told… I don't exist any more than the thousands of other gods that humans have created, worshiped, and died for since the beginning of time. But if you insist on believing in me, you do so at your own risk… I will lead you down the path of ignorance, intolerance, and bigotry… All because you believe.

== See also ==
- Godless Americans March on Washington (2002)
- Irreligion in the United States
- New atheism
- Secular humanism
