= I Sold My Soul on eBay =

2007 book by Hemant Mehta

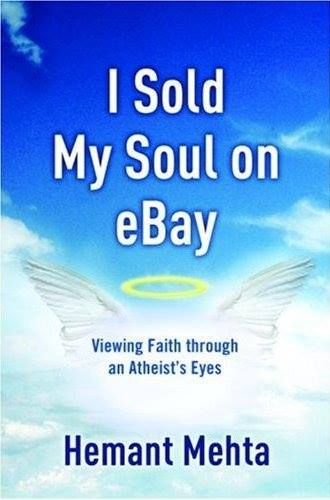
- Author: Hemant Mehta
- Language: English
- Subject: Christianity, Atheism
- Genre: Non-fiction
- Publisher: WaterBrook Press
- Publication date: April 17, 2007
- Publication place: United States
- Media type: Paperback, e-book, Audiobook
- Pages: 224
- ISBN: 1-4000-7347-2
- OCLC: 76897645
- Dewey Decimal: 261.2/1
- LC Class: BV640 .M44 2007

I Sold My Soul on eBay: Viewing Faith Through an Atheist's Eyes is a non-fiction book by Hemant Mehta, an atheist and blogger, and podcaster, who describes his visits to a variety of Christian churches. These visits initially occurred as a result of an eBay auction Mehta created where he offered to visit the worship services of the winning bidder's choosing. The media later branded this auction as Mehta "selling his soul."

== eBay auction ==
In January 2006, Hemant Mehta posted an auction on eBay where he explained his background in atheism and offered to go to the worship services of the winning bidder's choosing. The auction ended on February 3, 2006, with a final bid of $504 from Jim Henderson, a former minister from Seattle, Washington. Mehta later donated that money to the Secular Student Alliance, a non-profit organization for which he served as chair of the board of directors.

Henderson asked Mehta to visit a variety of churches and write about the experiences on Henderson's website, offthemap.com. Mehta eventually wrote about his visits at nine different churches as well as two additional pieces dealing with atheist conventions and Christian media.

== Media coverage ==
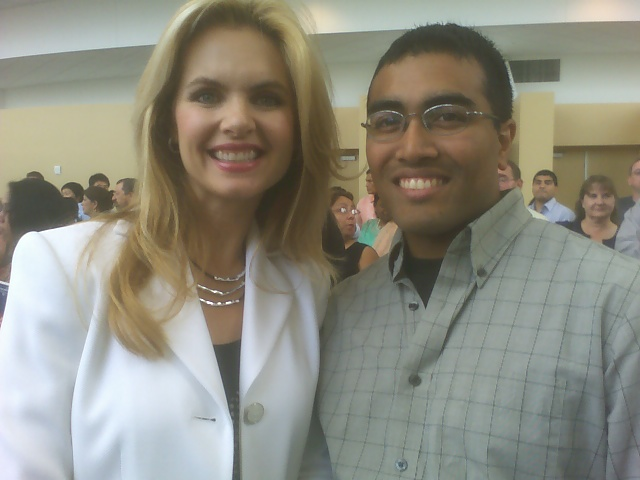
Hemant Mehta with Victoria Osteen

Nearly a month after the auction, an article about Mehta's experiences appeared on the front page of The Wall Street Journal, leading to additional media coverage. Mehta and Henderson were interviewed about the project on the Fox News program Big Story Primetime in March 2006.

== Book ==
I Sold My Soul on eBay, published by WaterBrook Press, contains Mehta's observations and critiques of the churches he visited, along with background on how he became an atheist. The foreword was written by Rob Bell of Mars Hill Bible Church.

The book includes descriptions of his visits to some of the best-known churches in the country including New Life Church (Pastor Ted Haggard), Mars Hill Bible Church (Pastor Rob Bell), and Lakewood Church (Pastor Joel Osteen).
