= Frank Zindler =

American atheism activist

Frank R. Zindler

President of American Atheists
- In office 2008
- Preceded by: Ellen Johnson
- Succeeded by: Ed Buckner

Personal details
- Born: May 23, 1939 (age 87) Benton Harbor, Michigan, U.S.
- Spouse(s): Ann Elizabeth Zindler, née Hunt (1935–2013) (m. 1964–2013)
- Known for: Atheist activist; Author; Christ Myth Theory proponent; Editor; Linguist; Educator; Defense of teaching evolution in public schools; Defense of legalized abortion
- Website: frank-zindler.com

Frank R. Zindler (May 23, 1939) is an American editor who served as interim president of the atheist organization American Atheists in 2008.

== Career ==
Prior to his involvement in the atheist community, he was chairman of the Division of Science, Nursing, and Technology at Fulton–Montgomery Community College of the State University of New York. After the abduction and murder of Madalyn Murray O'Hair, her son Jon Garth Murray, and granddaughter Robin Eileen Murray-O'Hair in 1995, he became editor of both American Atheist magazine and Director of American Atheist Press. In 2009, he retired as editor of the magazine but continued as Director of American Atheist Press. In the spring of 2011, he published a multi-volume anthology of his short essays and other works.

At a party celebrating his 80th birthday, he came out of the closet as a gay man by giving a dramatic reading of the "Confessions" part of his autobiography.

In 2022, he published his eleventh book, The Amityville Horror: An Inquest into Paranormal Claims. The book was begun in the fall of 1979, as an example for his students of how to investigate claims of the supernatural and paranormal. When the book was two-thirds completed it was put aside when an oral publishing agreement fell apart. The story of how this played out is described both in his "Confessions" and in his exposé of The Amityville Horror.

== Debates ==
Over the course of a long life, Zindler engaged in a great number of radio, TV, and platform debates in defense of the "Wall of Separation" between state and church; the civil rights of atheists, humanists, secularists, and secularism generally; abortion rights; and the right to "death with dignity" at the end of life. He vigorously defended the teaching of evolution in public schools and the rights of LGBTQ Americans.

Among his most memorable debates were his radio debate (WMUZ Detroit, Al Kresta Show, November 14, 1989) with John P. Koster (author of The Atheist Syndrome) on the question "Does God Exist?"; his TV debate (Channel 13, Indianapolis, IN, The Dick Wolfsie Show) with John D. Morris on "The Question of Noah’s Flood"; and several radio debates (e.g., WTVN 610 AM, "Night Talk with Jim Bleikamp" in Columbus, OH) with Duane T. Gish on the question "Is Creationism Science?" He also had a famous debate with philosopher and theologian William Lane Craig at Willow Creek Community Church, South Barrington, IL on June 27, 1993.

Zindler is also a proponent of the mythicist theory that no historical person lies behind the Gospel picture of Jesus of Nazareth. After the publication of Bart Ehrman's 2012 book Did Jesus Exist? The Historical Argument for Jesus of Nazareth arguing (from a non-religious perspective) for the existence of a historical Jesus, Zindler and Robert M. Price co-edited an anthology of essays by various mythicists arguing against Ehrman's position.

== Selected bibliography ==
Zindler has authored, co-authored, translated, annotated, or edited several texts on atheism, science, religion, and many other subjects:

- Zindler, Frank R. (1991). Dial an Atheist: Greatest Hits from Ohio. American Atheist Press. ISBN 978-1-57884-950-5.
- Paine, Thomas (1993). Zindler, Frank (ed.). The Age of Reason (Part Three: Examination of the Prophecies. American Atheist Press. ISBN 978-0-910309-70-7.
- Ingersoll, Robert G.; Zindler, Frank R. (1997). A Few Reasons for doubting the Inspiration of the Bible. American Atheist Press. ISBN 978-1-57884-950-5.
- Drews, Arthur; Zindler, Frank R. (1997). The Legend of Saint Peter: A Contribution of Mythology to Christianity. American Atheist Press. ISBN 978-1-57884-951-2.
- Zindler, Frank R. (2003). The Jesus the Jews Never Knew: Sepher Toldoth Yeshu and the Quest of the Historical Jesus in Jewish Sources. American Atheist Press. ISBN 978-1-57884-916-1.
- Salm, René (2008). Zindler, Frank (ed.). The Myth of Nazareth: The Invented Town of Jesus. American Atheist Press. ISBN 978-1-57884-003-8.
- Price, Robert M. (2010). Zindler, Frank (ed.). The Age of Reason: Examination of the Prophecies. American Atheist Press. ISBN 978-1-57884-005-2.
- Price, Robert M. (2010). Zindler, Frank (ed.). The Case Against The Case For Christ: A New Testament Scholar Refutes the Reverend Lee Strobel. American Atheist Press. ISBN 978-1-57884-005-2.
- Riskas, Thomas (2011). Zindler, Frank (ed.). Deconstructing Mormonism: An Analysis and Assessment of the Mormon Faith. American Atheist Press. ISBN 978-1-57884-007-6.
- Zindler, Frank R. (2011). Through Atheist Eyes: Scenes From a World That Won't Reason. Volume I: Religions & Scriptures. American Atheist Press. ISBN 978-1-57884-011-3.
- Zindler, Frank R. (2011). Through Atheist Eyes: Scenes From a World That Won't Reason. Volume II: Science & Pseudoscience. American Atheist Press. ISBN 978-1-57884-012-0.
- Zindler, Frank R. (2011). Through Atheist Eyes: Scenes From a World That Won't Reason. Volume III: Debates. American Atheist Press. ISBN 978-1-57884-013-7.
- Zindler, Frank R. (2011). Through Atheist Eyes: Scenes From a World That Won't Reason. Volume IV: Omnium-Gatherum. American Atheist Press. ISBN 978-1-57884-014-4.
- Zindler, Frank R.; Price, Robert M. (2013). Bart Ehrman and the Quest of the Historical Jesus of Nazareth. American Atheist Press. ISBN 978-1-57884-019-9.
- Salm, René (2015). Zindler, Frank (ed.). NazarethGate: Quack Archeology, Holy Hoaxes, and the Invented Town of Jesus. American Atheist Press. ISBN 978-1-57884-038-0.
- Zindler, Frank R. (2019). Confessions of a Born-Again Atheist: The Implausible Lives of a Godless Guy. American Atheist Press. ISBN 978-1-57884-039-7.
- Zindler, Frank R. (2022). The Amityville Horror: An Inquest into Paranormal Claims, GCRR Press, ISBN 978-1-959281-02-3 (Print) and ISBN 978-1-959281-03-0 (eBook)

Preceded by Ellen Johnson	President of American Atheists; 2008	Succeeded by Ed Buckner
