= The Battle over School Prayer: How Engel v. Vitale Changed America =

2007 book by Bruce Dierenfield

The Battle Over School Prayer : How Engel v. Vitale Changed America is a 2007 book by Bruce Dierenfield about the United States Supreme Court decision Engel v. Vitale. The Battle over School Prayer is noted for providing background about the plaintiffs based on personal interviews.

== Summary ==
Chapters 1-2 give a general historical overview beginning with the history of established churches in the colonies, Thomas Jefferson's Statute for Religious Freedom, James Madison's Memorial and Remonstrance, and Jefferson's Letter to the Danbury Baptists.

Chapter 3 discusses the three Establishment Clauses cases preceding Engel, including Everson v. Board of Education. The narrative details Felix Frankfurter's efforts to convince Frank Murphy and Robert Jackson to oppose Hugo Black's majority opinion. Dierenfield says Everson "firmly grafted" the wall of separation concept borrowed from Thomas Jefferson's writings "onto the language of the First Amendment".

The chapters about the background of the Engel case are based on interviews with the plaintiffs. Dierenfield gives an account of the harassment experienced by the plaintiffs. The narrative focuses on Lawrence Roth, an atheist of Hungarian-Jewish ancestry whose neighbors noted his "very liberal" politics were unusual in the era of McCarthyism. When his sons started school the Jewish population of the Roman Catholic majority school district was increasing. He was not happy to find out his son's third grade teacher displayed religious imagery in the classroom. He strongly objected to prayer in school. The Roth family received thousands of threatening phone calls and hate mail. Protestors gathered outside their home and teenagers burned a cross in their driveway.

The last chapter of the book discusses several cases that were decided after Engel:

- Abington School District v. Schempp
- Lemon v. Kurtzman
- Stone v. Graham
- Wallace v. Jaffree
- Westside Community Board of Education v. Mergens
- Lee v. Weisman
- Santa Fe Independent School District v. Doe

Dierenfield says that "most Americans have come to recognize that this landmark decision did not impair religious freedom but safeguarded it". He says the Engel decision merely acknowledged changes in American society but did not cause those changes: "Given the ever-growing religious pluralism in U.S. Society, the Court simply accommodated Constitutional law to [social] reality".

== Reception ==
James Fraser wrote that "that are far too many factual errors". He gives examples from the historical overview and the analysis of post-Engel Establishment Clause jurisprudence. Fraser says "these errors are not isolated cases and they mar an otherwise terrific book."

Ronna Greff Schneider questioned Dierenfield's conclusion that the decision marked "the ultimate triumph of the doctrine known as separation of church and state". Aaron Haberman, on the other hand, says Dierenfield "does a fine job of placing the Engel case in the broader context of the transformation of church-state jurisprudence that has resulted in a more secularized public square".

Haberman says the last chapter is the book's "weakest point". He says Dierenfield offers only a superficial overview of the history of the School Prayer Amendment. Haberman praises the book's "straightforward argument and writing style".

Thomas Healy says the book is "well-researched and readable".

== Sources ==
- Dierenfield, Bruce (2007). The Battle Over School Prayer: How Engel v. Vitale Changed America. University Press of Kansas. ISBN 978-0-7006-1526-1.
- Fraser, James W. (2009). "Review". History of Education Quarterly. 49 (4). JSTOR 40649258.
- Haberman, Aaron L. (2008). "Review". Journal of Church and State. 50 (2). JSTOR 23921563.
- Healy, Thomas (2008). "Review". Political Science Quarterly. 123 (1). JSTOR 20202991.
- McGarvie, Mark (2009). "Review". Law and History Review. 27 (1).
- Schneider, Ronna Greff (2008). "Review: God, Schools and Country". Human Rights Quarterly. 30 (3). JSTOR 20072869.
