= The Most Hated Woman in America =

2017 film by Tommy O'Haver

- Release poster
- Directed by: Tommy O'Haver
- Written by: Tommy O'Haver; Irene Turner
- Produced by: Elizabeth Banks; Laura Rister
- Starring: Melissa Leo; Peter Fonda; Sally Kirkland; Rory Cochrane; Josh Lucas; Adam Scott; Juno Temple; Vincent Kartheiser
- Cinematography: Armando Salas
- Edited by: Michael X. Flores
- Music by: Alan Ari Lazar
- Production companies: Brownstone Productions; Untitled Entertainment
- Distributed by: Netflix
- Release dates: March 14, 2017 (SXSW); March 24, 2017 (United States)
- Running time: 91 minutes
- Country: United States
- Language: English

The Most Hated Woman in America is a 2017 American biographical drama film directed by Tommy O'Haver and written by O'Haver and Irene Turner. It stars Melissa Leo as Madalyn Murray O'Hair.

The film premiered at South by Southwest on March 14, 2017. It was released on Netflix on March 24, 2017.

== Plot ==
In 1995, Madalyn Murray O'Hair is kidnapped along with her son Garth and granddaughter Robin by three men: David Waters, Gary Karr and Danny Fry. The three abductees recognize Waters.

The scene shifts to the early 1960s. Madalyn has become a single mother of two sons, Garth and the older William J. "Billy Boy" Murray Jr., and is a proud atheist, which outrages her Christian parents. Madalyn is outraged to learn that Billy is being forced to recite the Lord's Prayer in school, so she launches a campaign to ban school prayer, ultimately resulting in a Supreme Court ruling making mandatory prayer in schools illegal. She quickly becomes labeled one of the most hated figures in America. She forms the atheist advocacy group American Atheists, recruiting Garth and Billy. Billy's devotion to his mother destroys his relationship with his wife, and he becomes a bitter alcoholic after she divorces him. He eventually quits drinking and becomes a born-again Christian, causing a deep rift with Madalyn.

Madalyn begins profiting from spirited debates with a local pastor, putting the money in offshore accounts. She hires Waters to manage the American Atheists branch; he becomes her trusted ally, especially after he confides in her about having murdered someone as a young man. Eventually, Waters has a falling out with Madalyn and is fired from American Atheists. In 1995, he demands one million dollars from Madalyn, which she refuses. Waters devises the kidnapping as a way to get the money he feels she owes him. Reporter Jack Ferguson begins covering the kidnapping and questions Billy. He gets a sketch artist to draw a picture of Fry. Ferguson joins forces with Madalyn's assistant and they slowly unravel the plot.

Back at the safe house, Karr kills Robin after she refuses his sexual advances. Panicked, Waters and Karr then kill Garth and Madalyn. Finally, Karr kills Fry after forcing him to dismember the bodies. Ferguson finally catches Waters and gets him to confess to the triple murder. Waters and Karr are both arrested and tried. Closing text reports that Karr received a life sentence; Waters received 68 years but died in prison in 2003. Billy now chairs the Religious Freedom Coalition and works to return mandated prayer to public schools, and the American Atheists continues to exist.

== Cast ==
- Melissa Leo as Madalyn Murray O'Hair, an atheist activist
- Josh Lucas as David Waters, American Atheists' former manager who masterminds the kidnapping
- Michael Chernus as Jon Garth Murray, Madalyn's loyal younger son
  - Devin Taylor Freeman as teenage Jon Garth Murray
- Rory Cochrane as Gary Karr, one of the Murray O'Hairs' kidnappers
- Vincent Kartheiser as William J. "Billy Boy" Murray, Madalyn's elder son
  - Andy Walken as Young William "Billy Boy" Murray
- Sally Kirkland as Lena Christina, Madalyn's mother
- Adam Scott as Jack Ferguson, the reporter who first looks into the kidnapping
- Juno Temple as Robin Murray O'Hair, Madalyn's devoted granddaughter and Bill's estranged daughter
- Alex Frost as Danny Fry, one of the Murray O'Hairs' kidnappers
- Brandon Mychal Smith as Roy Collier, Madalyn's right-hand man at American Atheists
- Peter Fonda as Reverend Bob Harrington
- Ryan Cutrona as John Mays, Madalyn's father
- Anna Camp as Mrs. Lutz, the schoolteacher of young William Murray who enforces prayers in class

== Production ==
On July 8, 2015, it was reported that Netflix would finance and release The Most Hated Woman in America, a film dramatizing the life of Madalyn Murray O'Hair. It would be directed by Tommy O'Haver from his own script and star Melissa Leo as O'Hair. In March 2016, Peter Fonda, Sally Kirkland, Rory Cochrane, Josh Lucas, Adam Scott, Juno Temple, Vincent Kartheiser, Anna Camp, Michael Chernus, and Alex Frost joined the cast.

On March 24, 2016, it was reported that The Most Hated Woman in America had begun filming in Los Angeles the previous week.

== Release ==
The film had its world premiere at South by Southwest on March 14, 2017. It was released on March 24, 2017, by Netflix.

== Reception ==
On the review aggregator website Rotten Tomatoes, 36% of 22 critics' reviews are positive, with an average rating of 4.6/10. The website's consensus reads: "This lackluster look into the farcical face of The Most Hated Woman in America has some sly performances but offers little in the way of further insight." Metacritic, which uses a weighted average, assigned the film a score of 41 out of 100, based on 7 critics, indicating "mixed or average" reviews.

Peter Debruge of Variety gave the film a negative review, writing: "Seems to fall right where you'd expect: slightly better than your average TV movie, while not as good as your typical theatrical release."
