= School Prayer Amendment =

Proposed amendment to the United States Constitution

The School Prayer Amendment is a proposed amendment to the United States Constitution intended by its proponents to protect the right of the students if they wish, to voluntarily pray in schools, although opponents argue it allows for government-sponsored prayer.

In 1962 and 1963, the United States Supreme Court ruled that school prayer in the United States can not be enforced by government mandate due to the Establishment Clause, and that only voluntary prayer was legal. In reaction, the Senator Robert Byrd of West Virginia proposed this amendment to legalize school prayer. His proposal failed, but Byrd re-introduced the amendment on six occasions from 1973 to 1997.

== Background ==
In the cases Engel v. Vitale (1962) and Abington School District v. Schempp (1963), the United States Supreme Court ruled that government mandated school prayer is unconstitutional under the Establishment Clause of the First Amendment. However voluntary prayer is not unconstitutional.

The history of school prayer amendment began in 1962 with the Supreme Court case of Engel v. Vitale. A New York policy required schools to begin each day with a word of prayer. Regarding this case, Justice Hugo Black wrote "... the constitutional prohibition against laws respecting an establishment of religion must at least mean that in this country it is no part of the business of government to compose official prayers for any group of the American people to recite as a part of a religious program carried on by government."

The next year, a similar case arose: Abington Township School District v. Schempp. The effect of this incident was the prohibition of school officials from organizing or leading prayers as well as devotional Bible reading in public schools. Abington v. Schempp required that school faculties should neither promote nor degrade religion. The Supreme Court next examined school prayer in 1985 with the case of Wallace v. Jaffree. A change to Alabama's moment-of-silence law included a requirement that the moment of silence must be for "meditation or voluntary prayer." The Court saw the change as government promotion of prayer in the schools, and overturned the change to the law. The justices explained that a moment of silence is appropriate, but not for any religious purpose.

== Text ==
Article--

SECTION 1. To secure the people's right to acknowledge God according to the dictates of conscience: The people's right to pray and to recognize their religious beliefs, heritage, or traditions on public property, including schools, shall not be infringed. The Government shall not require any person to join in prayer or other religious activity, initiate or designate school prayers, discriminate against religion, or deny equal access to a benefit on account of religion.

=== H. J. RES. 16 ===
Article—

Nothing in this Constitution shall be construed to prohibit individual or group prayer in public schools or other public institutions. No person shall be required by the United States or by any State to participate in prayer. Neither the United States nor any State shall prescribe the content of any such prayer.

== History ==
Democratic Senator Robert Byrd of West Virginia proposed the amendment in 1962, 1973, 1979, 1982, 1993, 1995, and 1997.

The New York Times reported in July 1999 that the House of Representatives, at that time occupied by a Republican majority, had long been proposing such an amendment but was preoccupied with a competing, more general amendment allowing for "religious freedoms" proposed by Henry Hyde, then-Chairman of the House Judiciary Committee. Representative Ernest Istook, a Republican from Oklahoma's 5th congressional district, proposed the amendment on May 8, 1997. In March 1998, the Judiciary Committee passed the bill by a 16–11 vote. On June 4, 1998, the full House voted on the amendment, 224–203 in favor. The vote was 61 short of the two-thirds majority required by Article Five of the United States Constitution to propose a constitutional amendment.

Istook reintroduced the amendment to Congress twice: first in 1999 as the House Joint Resolution 66 and in 2001 as the "Religious Speech Amendment". Byrd proposed the amendment again on April 29, 2006.

Though the proposed amendment failed to be adopted, it led to the passing of the Equal Access Act.

Rick Perry, governor of Texas and Republican a former candidate for the 2012 presidential election, said in an interview on Fox News Sunday on December 11, 2011: "I would support a constitutional amendment that allows our children to pray in school anytime they would like."

== Reception ==
The Freedom From Religion Foundation, American Civil Liberties Union, and Americans United for Separation of Church and State have all expressed opposition to this amendment. The Family Research Council has supported it.

== Polls ==
In 1985, a nationwide telephone poll by The Washington Post found that 61% supported a School Prayer Amendment, 31% opposed it, and 8% had no opinion.

In 2005, a telephone poll administered by Gallup found that 76% of Americans favor "a constitutional amendment".
