= School prayer in the United States =

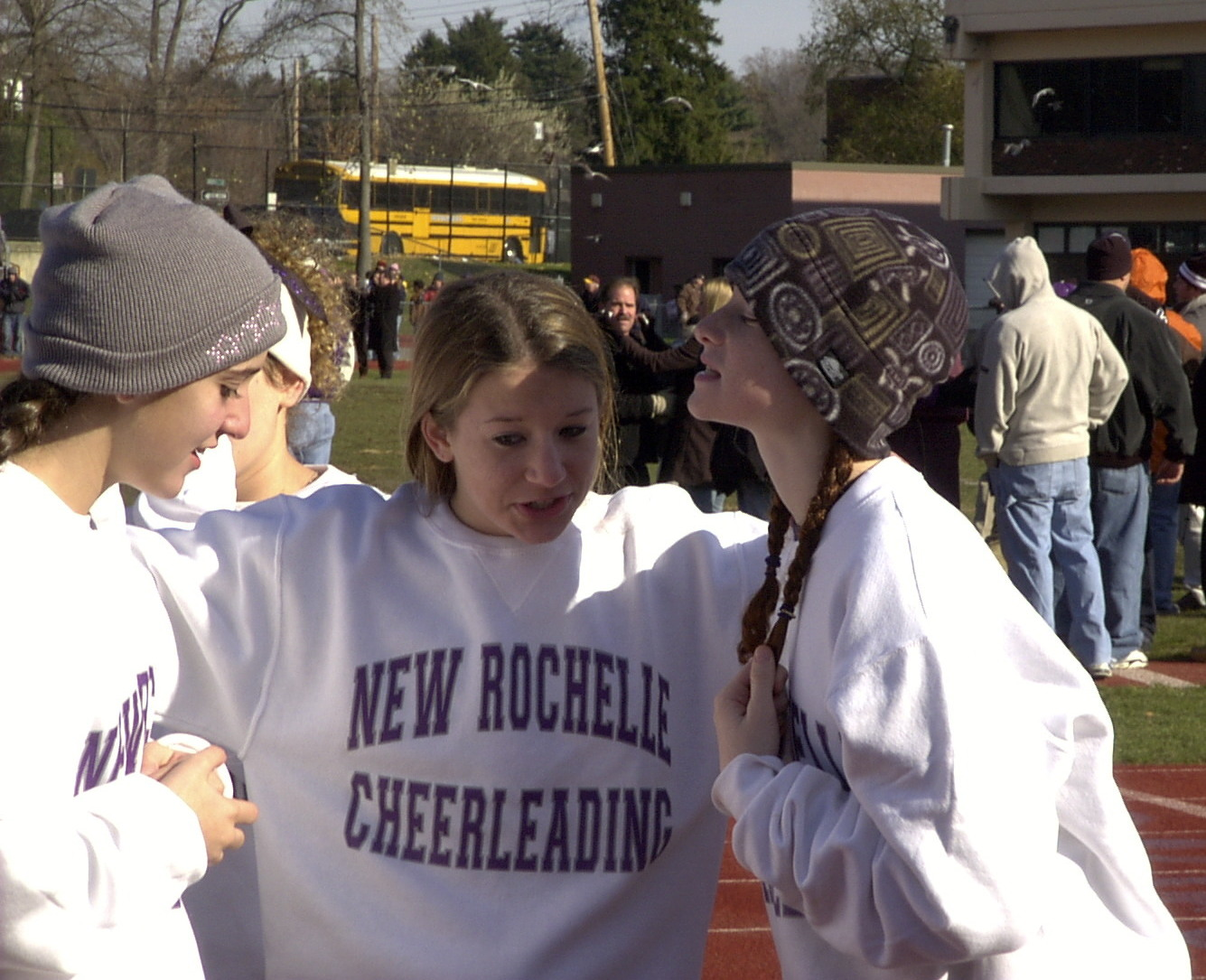
Cheerleaders at New Rochelle High School praying before an athletic event

School prayer in the United States, if organized by the school, is largely banned from public elementary, middle, and high schools by a series of Supreme Court decisions since 1962. Students may pray privately, and join religious clubs in after-school hours. Public schools, such as local school districts, are banned from conducting religious observances such as prayer. Private and parochial schools are not covered by these rulings, nor are colleges and universities. Elementary and secondary schools are covered because students are required to attend, and are considered more at risk from official pressure than are older students and adults. The constitutional basis for this prohibition is the First Amendment to the United States Constitution, which requires that:

Congress shall make no law respecting an establishment of religion, or prohibiting the free exercise thereof ...

The first part of the amendment ("Congress shall make no law respecting an establishment of religion") is known as the Establishment Clause of the First Amendment, while the second part ("or prohibiting the free exercise thereof") is known as the Free Exercise Clause.

Although each of these clauses originally applied only to the federal government, the Fourteenth Amendment extended the scope of the entire First Amendment to all levels of government, including the state and local levels, thus compelling states and their public schools to adopt an equally detached approach to religion in schools.

Since 1962, the Supreme Court has repeatedly ruled that school-mandated prayers in public schools are unconstitutional. United States law does permit religious education of public school students, along with voluntary prayer, during school hours under the principle of released time as "long as the teachers are not state-approved, public money is not involved, and there is no state coercion."

== School prayer prior to 1962 ==
Until the mid-20th century, it was common practice for public schools to open with a prayer or Bible reading. The 19th-century debates over public funding for religious schools, and reading the King James Bible in the public schools was most heated in 1863 and 1876. Partisan activists on the public-school issue believed that exposing Catholic schoolchildren to that particular translation would loosen their affiliation to the Catholic Church. In response, Catholics repeatedly objected to the distinctly Protestant observances in local schools. For instance, in the Edgerton Bible Case (Weiss v. District Board (1890)), the Wisconsin Supreme Court ruled in favor of Catholics who objected to the use of the Protestant Bible in public schools. This ruling was based on the state constitution and only applied in Wisconsin. Eventually, Catholics had a larger voice and even control over politics in the major cities. Irish Catholic women – who married late or not at all – began to specialize as teachers in the public schools. Catholics and some other high church groups including German Lutherans, Episcopalians as well as members of other religions such as Jews, set up their own school systems, called parochial schools. Southern Baptists and fundamentalists in the late 20th century began aggressively setting up their own schools, where religion was practiced but no government aid was used. Likewise, homeschooling in the late 20th century represented a reaction against compulsory schooling that did not promote religious ideals.

In 1949, Bible reading was a part of routine in the public schools of at least thirty-seven states. In twelve of these states, Bible reading was legally required by state laws; 11 states passed these laws after 1913. In 1960, 42% of school districts nationwide tolerated or required Bible reading, and 50% reported some form of homeroom daily devotional exercise.

=== A turning point: the "Regents' Prayer" and Engel v. Vitale ===
The media and popular culture often erroneously credit atheist Madalyn Murray O'Hair with removing school prayer from US public schools, when the case against recitation of the Lord's Prayer in Baltimore schools was decided by the Supreme Court in 1963. A more significant case had reached the Supreme Court one year prior, suddenly changing the legal climate for school prayer. In 1955, the New York Board of Regents developed a prayer recommended (but not required) for school districts under its purview. The prayer was relatively short: "Almighty God, we acknowledge our dependence on Thee, and we beg Thy blessings upon us, our parents, our teachers, and our country." The board stated that the prayer would "combat juvenile delinquency and counter the spread of Communism".

Seven years later, Steven I. Engel, a Jew, was upset to see his son's hands clasped and his head bowed in prayer. He told his son that this was "not the way we say prayers". Engel, a founding member of the New York Civil Liberties Union, brought action along with Daniel Lichtenstein, Monroe Lerner, Lenore Lyons, and Lawrence Roth, all parents of children in the Long Island, New York public school system, against Union Free School District No. 9 for its adoption and subsequent prescription of the so-called "Regent's prayer", arguing that it constituted the state-sponsored establishment of religion in violation of citizens' First Amendment rights via the Fourteenth Amendment.

Use of the Regent's prayer was initially upheld in both New York State Court and in the New York Court of Appeals, prompting Engel to petition the US Supreme Court in the Engel v. Vitale case in 1962. With its 6–1 vote to make public recitation of the Regents' Prayer in public schools unlawful, the U.S. Supreme Court made its first-ever decision on prayer in public schools. It made its second in 1963—the Abington School District v. Schempp ruling, which made the corporate reading of the Bible and recitation of the Lord's Prayer unlawful in public schools.

== 1963 and after ==
In these two landmark decisions, Engel v. Vitale (1962) and Abington School District v. Schempp (1963), which focused primarily on school-sponsored Bible reading, the Supreme Court established what is now the current prohibition on state-sponsored prayer in US schools. While the Engel decision held that the promulgation of an official state-school prayer stood in violation of the First Amendment's Establishment Clause (thus overruling the New York courts' decisions), Abington held that Bible readings and other public school-sponsored religious activities were prohibited. Madalyn Murray's lawsuit, Murray v. Curlett, contributed to the removal of compulsory Bible reading from the public schools of the United States.

The Murray suit was consolidated with the Abington case. With the success of the lawsuits, the intent of the Constitution with regard to the relationship between church and state again came under critical scrutiny and has remained there to this day. While students do retain the right to pray in public schools, even in organized groups such as "See You at the Pole", the Engel, Abington and Murray lawsuits disallowed schools from including prayer as a compulsory activity required of every student.

Following these two cases came the Court's decision in Lemon v. Kurtzman (1971), a ruling that established the Lemon test for religious activities within schools. The Lemon test states that, in order to be constitutional under the Establishment Clause, any practice sponsored within state-run schools (or other public state-sponsored activities) must adhere to the following three criteria:

1. Have a secular purpose;
2. Must neither advance nor inhibit religion; and
3. Must not result in an excessive entanglement between government and religion.

In 2001, the Supreme Court ruled in Good News Club v. Milford Central School that Child Evangelism Fellowship could use public-school facilities to facilitate Bible clubs.

As of 2019, religious prayer can still be seen in public schools in America. In a nationally representative sample of 1,800 teens (ages 13–17), 12% from the South region of the United States say that they have had a teacher lead their class in prayer. LifeWise Academy provides Bible education for public school students during school hours under released time laws.

In 2021, KQED wrote, "Elk Grove Unified School District began ... setting aside rooms in many of its middle and high schools for prayer during Muslim holidays." As the Supreme Court found in Santa Fe Independent School District v. Doe, "nothing in the Constitution as interpreted by this Court prohibits any public school student from voluntarily praying at any time before, during, or after the schoolday."

In 2015, high school football coach Joseph Kennedy was fired for kneeling at 50-yard line after football games to pray. Religious conservative groups argued that this was a violation of his First Amendment right of freedom of speech as a private citizen. The case was taken to the U.S. Court of Appeals for the 9th Circuit in 2017. It ruled in favor of the Washington State school district, saying that Kennedy was acting as a public official and not as a private citizen when he was praying in front of students and parents. After refusing to take the case in January 2019, the Supreme Court granted certiorari in April 2022. The Court ruled in favor of Kennedy on June 27, 2022, in Kennedy v. Bremerton School District.

== Controversy ==
Some reactions to Engel and Abington were negative, with over 150 constitutional amendments submitted to reverse the policy. None passed Congress. Catholics were the most hostile group to the Court decisions. Evangelicals at first were divided, but then came around to the anti-Court position, seeing themselves increasingly as a beleaguered minority in a rapidly secularizing nation.

Many school districts and states attempted to reestablish school-sponsored prayer in different forms since 1962. Since the 1990s, controversy in the courts has tended to revolve around prayer at school-sponsored extracurricular activities. Examples can be seen in the cases of Lee v. Weisman (1992) and Santa Fe Independent School Dist. v. Doe (2000), where public prayers at graduation ceremonies and those conducted via public address system prior to high school games (at state school facilities before a school-gathered audience) were, respectively, ruled unconstitutional.

Despite their attempts to present a clear stance on school-sponsored religious activity, Engel, Abington, and the cases for which these serve as precedent are cited by some proponents of school prayer as evidence of a contradiction between the Establishment and Free Exercise Clauses. While the Establishment Clause proscribes the state sponsorship of religion, the Free Exercise Clause forbids state interference in individual religious exercise. Where a state entity moves to accommodate the right to individual religious expression under the latter clause, opponents of that "expression" may cite such accommodation as state "promotion" of one religious activity over another. Regarding the Free Exercise Clause, the courts have consistently stated that students' setting forth of religious views through prayer cannot be forbidden unless such activity can be shown to cause disruption in the school, yet it remains beyond the scope of the state to require such practice. Thus, anyone is allowed to pray in schools in the United States, as long as it is not officially sponsored by the school and it does not disrupt others from doing their work.

The United States Supreme Court: A Political and Legal Analysis discussed the results of a 1991 survey, stating that: "The Court's school prayer decisions were, and still are, deeply unpopular with the public, many politicians and most religions organizations. 95 percent of the population believe in God and some 60 percent belong to a religious organization. In a 1991 opinion poll, 78 percent of Americans support the reintroduction of school prayer." As a result of public support for school prayer in the United States, The Oxford Companion to the Supreme Court of the United States reports, "the public's support for school prayer was translated by various state legislatures into statutes aiding religious schools and practices." Analysis of multiple polls since the 1970s by sociologist Philip Schwadel showed support for school prayer dipped slightly but remains popular with the majority of Americans, with a recent 2011 poll showing 65 percent support. Results show that those who attend church on a regular basis are 33% more likely to support prayer in schools than those who rarely attend church (82% and 49%, respectively). In addition, political ideology also plays a role in determining attitudes towards prayer in schools. Those who identify as Republican are more inclined to support daily prayer than Democrats and independents, as 80% of Republicans, 64% of independents, and 45% of Democrats are in favor. Studies show that these numbers have been steadily dropping since 2001, but the majority of Americans continue to support having religion in the education system.

=== Public opinion ===
Questions regarding whether prayer should be present or absent in the United States public school system have been causing controversy for decades due to the need to allow religious freedom and guarantee the rights of the First Amendment of the United States Constitution. Although the topic has many opponents as well as those who are indifferent to the issue, a 2014 Gallup poll indicates that the majority of Americans, 61%, are in favor of allowing daily prayer in the classroom and 37% oppose daily worship.

Evangelical Protestants are more likely to approve of school prayer than other religious groups. In a nationally representative study of 1,800 teens in the United States, 68% of the Evangelical Protestant teens surveyed thought it was appropriate for a teacher to lead a class in prayer while only 25% of unaffiliated teens agreed.

=== "Moment of silence" ===
Despite ongoing debate, there are some instances when religious freedom and secular stability have been temporarily balanced. In the United States, some administrations have introduced a "moment of silence" or "moment of reflection" in which a student may, if they wish to, offer a silent prayer. The Supreme Court of the United States decision in Wallace v. Jaffree (1984) held that a moment of silence in schools for the purpose of individual prayer or meditation constituted a valid application of the Free Exercise Clause, while a moment of silence for the clear intended purpose of a state-approved devotional activity constituted a violation of the Establishment Clause. In this same case, the issue of school prayer was further complicated by a distinction made between a public assembly attended by participants of their own free will, and a public event where attendance is legally required.

A voluntarily attended Congress may open sessions with a prayer, but schools full of public pupils may not. Here the US Supreme Court has interpreted the issue as revolving around the degree of a government's ability to indoctrinate its citizens. If it appears that participants at a state-sponsored event are more likely to influence the State itself, courts may treat prayer as "legislative prayer". If, on the other hand, the State is more likely to influence participants at its events, courts may treat prayer as "state-sponsored" prayer and thereby rule it unconstitutional.

==== Yoga ====
In recent years, yoga exercise has been introduced into some public schools in the U.S., despite modern yoga's historical roots as a Hindu religious practice. Advocates for the programs say they help children to relax and concentrate, but critics counter that the programs violate the separation of church and state.

An article written in 2018 by Alia Wong outlines and gives more detail to the controversy of yoga in public schools. While current data about the prevalence of this topic is hard to come by, a survey in 2015 headed by a psychologist from New York, Bethany Butzer, found that almost four dozen yoga programs had spread across the United States to 940 schools. Butzer concluded that these programs were safe and fine to implement and that they would continue to grow in popularity as the years passed.

However, in 2016, a school in Cobb County, Georgia was found to be the topic of discussion when a majority of parents objected to the school's new yoga program on the grounds that it "promoted a non-Christian belief system." The district was compelled to significantly edit their program and included new changes such as "removing the "namaste" greeting and the coloring-book exercises involving mandalas."

In the education scene, it continues to be a topic of controversy whether or not programs such as yoga are a poor use of governmental and public funds, especially at schools that are in low-income areas or already not properly funded.

== See also ==
- School prayer, worldwide coverage
- Accommodationism
- Prayers at United States presidential inaugurations
- Congressional Prayer Room
- Freedom of religion
- Moment of silence
- Madalyn Murray O'Hair
- Separation of church and state
- Status of religious freedom by country
- Santa Fe Independent School District v. Doe
