= William J. Murray =

American activist and minister (born 1946)

- Born: William J. Murray III; May 25, 1946 (age 80); Ashland County, Ohio, U.S.
- Occupations: Author, Minister, Lobbyist
- Organization: Religious Freedom Coalition
- Known for: Murray v. Curlett; Son of Madalyn Murray O'Hair; My Life Without God
- Title: Chairman
- Spouse: Nancy Murray
- Children: 2 (including Robin)
- Parent(s): William J. Murray, Jr. Madalyn Murray O'Hair
- Relatives: Jon Garth Murray (half-brother)
- Website: wjmurray.com

William J. Murray III (born May 25, 1946) is an American Baptist minister and lobbyist. Murray serves as the chairman of the Religious Freedom Coalition, a non-profit organization in Washington, D.C. that lobbies Congress on issues related to aiding Christians in Islamic and Communist countries.

Son of the late atheist activist Madalyn Murray O'Hair, Murray was named as the plaintiff in his mother's challenge to mandatory prayer and Bible reading in public schools. Consolidated and heard as Abington School District v. Schempp (1963), the US Supreme Court ruled that mandatory Bible reading was unconstitutional. After becoming a Christian in 1980, Murray published the memoir My Life Without God (1982), about his spiritual journey.

== Biography ==
William J. Murray III (known as Bill) was born in Ohio in 1946, after his mother Madalyn Mays Roths had returned from service in Italy during World War II. His father was William J. Murray Jr., a married Catholic officer with whom Madalyn had an affair while they were both stationed in Italy. Though Murray refused to get a divorce and marry Madalyn, she divorced her husband, changed her surname to Murray, and named her newborn son William J. Murray, after his father.

Madalyn moved with the baby to Baltimore, where her mother and brother lived.

In 1954, Bill's half-brother Jon Garth Murray was born. When Bill was still a child, Madalyn started hosting Socialist Labor party meetings and encouraged him to attend so he could "learn the 'truth' about capitalism". Madalyn became an atheist activist when the boys were still young and attending public school.

In 1960, after returning with her two boys to the United States from a trip to Paris, during which she had unsuccessfully applied for immigration to the Soviet Union, Madalyn brought Bill to the local junior high to enroll him in classes and was incensed to see the students praying during class. After various attempts to prevent Bill's attendance during prayer and Bible reading time, Madalyn gained national attention when she filed a lawsuit challenging the practice of compulsory prayer and Bible reading in public schools as unconstitutional, naming Bill as plaintiff. The Murrays' case, Murray v. Curlett, was folded into Abington School District v. Schempp before the Supreme Court of the United States heard the issues.

In 1963, the US Supreme Court ruled that mandatory Bible reading in public schools was unconstitutional. The year before, in 1962, it had overturned the practice of mandatory prayers in public schools.

Murray later worked in various industries in the private sector, including the airline industry. He had a daughter, Robin, with his high school girlfriend, who stayed with his family after running away from home.

In 1980, Murray became a Christian. Learning of his conversion, his mother commented: "One could call this a postnatal abortion on the part of a mother, I guess; I repudiate him entirely and completely for now and all times. He is beyond human forgiveness." He became a Baptist minister. He and his mother Madalyn Murray O'Hair were estranged by his action, as he was from his daughter and brother, who shared his mother's household and were deeply involved with the American Atheists organization. O'Hair had legally adopted Robin.

In 1995, Bill Murray's mother Madalyn, daughter Robin, and half-brother Jon disappeared from their home and office. It was learned that they were kidnapped, held for about a month, and subjected to extortion demands of US$600,000 (equivalent to $1.3 million in 2025) before they were killed in a remote area outside Austin, Texas. Their bodies were not found until January 2001. The plot was led by David Roland Waters, an ex-convict and former employee of the American Atheists, who had been fired for theft of US$54,000, along with two accomplices.

== Bibliography ==
- My Life Without God. Harvest House Publishers, 1982 ISBN 0-7369-0315-1.
- The Church Is Not for Perfect People Harvest House Publishers, 1987 ISBN 0-89081-602-6
- Let Us Pray: A Plea for Prayer in Our Schools 1995 ISBN 0-688-14563-9
- Stop the Y2K Madness! 1999 ISBN 0-940917-04-1
- The Pledge: One Nation Under God. AMG 2007, ISBN 0-89957-035-6, ISBN 978-0-89957-035-8. Freeware written by Todd Akin
- Utopian Road to Hell: Enslaving America and the World with Central Planning WND Books 2016 ISBN 1944229086, ISBN 978-1944229085
