= Madalyn Murray O'Hair =

American atheist activist (1919–1995)

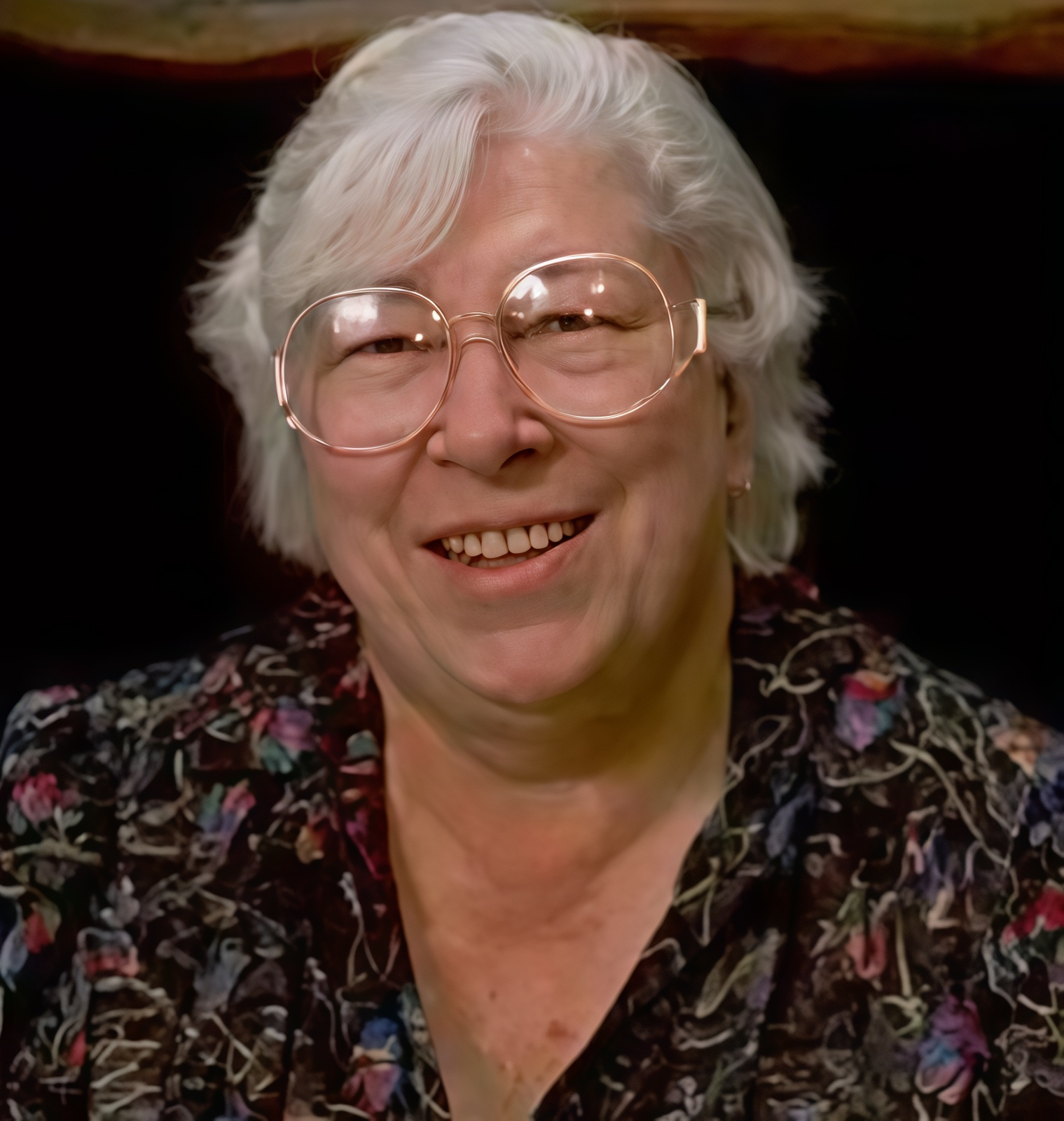
- At the 25th anniversary celebration of the founding of the American Atheists.

President of American Atheists
- In office 1963–1986
- Preceded by: Position established
- Succeeded by: Jon Garth Murray

Personal details
- Born: Madalyn Mays; April 13, 1919 Pittsburgh, Pennsylvania, U.S.
- Died: September 29, 1995 (aged 76) San Antonio, Texas, U.S.
- Cause of death: Murder
- Spouses: John Roths (m. 1941; div. 1946) Richard O'Hair (m. 1965; died 1978)
- Domestic partner(s): William Murray; Michael Fiorillo
- Children: William (with Murray); Jon (with Fiorillo)
- Education: Ashland University (BA); South Texas College of Law (LLB)

Madalyn Murray O'Hair (née Mays; April 13, 1919 – September 29, 1995) was an American activist who supported atheism, separation of church and state, and feminism. In 1963, she founded American Atheists and served as its president until 1986, after which her son Jon Garth Murray succeeded her. She created the first issues of American Atheist Magazine and identified as a militant feminist.

O'Hair is best known for the Murray v. Curlett lawsuit, which challenged the policy of mandatory prayers and Bible reading in Baltimore public schools, in which she named her first son William J. Murray as plaintiff. Consolidated with Abington School District v. Schempp (1963), it was heard by the United States Supreme Court, which ruled that officially sanctioned mandatory Bible-reading in American public schools was unconstitutional.

The Supreme Court had prohibited officially sponsored prayer in schools in Engel v. Vitale (1962) on similar grounds. After she founded the American Atheists and won Murray v. Curlett, she achieved attention to the extent that in 1964, Life magazine referred to her as "the most hated woman in America". Through American Atheists, O'Hair filed numerous other suits on issues of separation of church and state.

In 1995, O'Hair, her son Garth, and her granddaughter Robin disappeared from Austin, Texas. Initial speculation suggested the trio had absconded with hundreds of thousands of dollars from American Atheists coffers; in fact, the trio had been murdered by their former associates, and the bodies were not found until 2001.

== Early and personal life ==
Madalyn Mays was born in the Beechview neighborhood of Pittsburgh, Pennsylvania, on April 13, 1919, the daughter of Lena Christina (née Scholle) and John Irwin Mays. She had an older brother, John Irwin Jr. (known as "Irv"). Their father was of Scots-Irish ethnicity and their mother was of German ancestry. At the age of four, Madalyn was baptized into her father's Presbyterian church; her mother was a Lutheran. The family moved to Ohio, and in 1936, Mays graduated from Rossford High School in Rossford.

In 1941, Mays married John Henry Roths, a steelworker. They separated when they both enlisted for World War II service, he in the United States Marine Corps, and she in the Women's Army Corps. In April 1945, while posted to a cryptography position in Italy, she began a relationship with officer William J. Murray Jr., a married Roman Catholic. He refused to divorce his wife. Mays divorced Roths and adopted the name Madalyn Murray. She gave birth to her son with officer Murray after returning to Ohio, and named the boy William J. Murray III (nicknamed "Bill").

In 1949, Murray completed a bachelor's degree from Ashland University. She earned a law degree from the South Texas College of Law, but did not pass the bar exam.

She moved with her son William to Baltimore, Maryland. On November 16, 1954, she gave birth to her second son, Jon Garth Murray, fathered by her boyfriend Michael Fiorillo.

According to her son William, a Baptist minister, Madalyn was a communist who unabashedly supported the Soviet Union. William claimed that when he was still a child, Madalyn began hosting Socialist Labor Party meetings and asked him to attend so he could, as quoted from Madalyn, "learn the 'truth' about capitalism." William also claimed that Madalyn, who denied being a communist, actually held secret meetings in their basement with her Communist Party comrades. She twice sought to defect to the Soviet Union, applying first in 1959 through the Soviet Embassy in Washington, D.C., and again at the Soviet Embassy in Paris, travelling there for the express purpose in 1960; on both occasions, the Soviets denied her entry. On their return from Paris, Murray and sons went to live with her mother, father, and brother, Irv, at their house in the Loch Raven, Baltimore neighborhood. Soon after, Madalyn accompanied William to their neighborhood school, Woodbourne Junior High School, to re-enroll William for freshman classes. Madalyn was unhappy to see students, after the recitation of the Pledge of Allegiance, engaging in prayer. She instructed William to keep a log of all religious exercises and references to religion for the next two weeks, saying, "Well, if they'll keep us from going to Russia where there is some freedom, we'll just have to change America." After the two weeks, and after her request that William be allowed to leave class during prayer times was denied by school authorities, she pulled him out of school and proceeded to file a lawsuit against the Baltimore Public School System, naming William as plaintiff. She said that its practices of mandatory prayer and required reading of the Bible were unconstitutional. The US Supreme Court upheld her position by a ruling in 1963.

Because of hostility in Baltimore against her family related to this case, Murray left Maryland with her sons in 1963 and moved to Honolulu, Hawaii. She had allegedly assaulted five Baltimore City Police Department officers who tried to retrieve her son William's girlfriend Susan from her house; she was a minor and had run away from home. Susan gave birth to William's daughter, whom she named Robin. Murray later adopted Robin.

In 1965, Murray married U.S. Marine Richard O'Hair, and changed her surname. He had belonged to a Communist group in Detroit during the 1940s. During investigations of the 1950s, he gave more than 100 names of other members to the FBI. Later, he was investigated for falsely claiming to be an FBI agent. Although the couple separated, they were legally married until his death in 1978.

In 1980, she publicly rejected her estranged son William when he announced that he had converted to Christianity. He later became a Baptist minister.

== Activism and politics ==
In 1960, Murray filed a lawsuit against the Baltimore City Public School System (Murray v. Curlett), naming her son William as plaintiff. She challenged the city school system's practice of requiring students to participate in Bible readings at the city's public schools. She said her son's refusal to participate had resulted in bullying by classmates and that administrators condoned this behavior. After consolidation with Abington School District v. Schempp, the lawsuit was heard by the Supreme Court of the United States in 1963. The Court voted 8–1 in Schempp's favor, saying that mandatory public Bible readings by students were unconstitutional. Prayer in schools other than Bible-readings had been ruled as unconstitutional the year before by the Court in Engel v. Vitale (1962).

O'Hair filed a number of other lawsuits: one was against the National Aeronautics and Space Administration (NASA) because of the Apollo 8 Genesis reading. The case was rejected by the U.S. Supreme Court for lack of jurisdiction. The challenge had limited effect.

O'Hair endorsed Jimmy Carter in the 1976 presidential election because of Carter's opposition to mandatory school prayer, his support for sex education in public schools, and his stance on ecological matters.

In a 1989 interview, O'Hair said "I told my kids I just want three words on my tombstone, if I have one. I'll probably be cremated. One is "woman." I'm very comfortable in that role. I've loved being a woman, I've loved being a mother, I've loved being a grandmother. I want three words: Woman, Atheist, Anarchist. That's me."

=== Feminism ===
During an interview with Playboy in 1965, O'Hair described herself as a "militant feminist" and expressed her dissatisfaction with women's inequality in America, stating during the interview:

The American male continues to use her sexually for one thing: a means to the end of his own ejaculation. It doesn't seem to occur to him that she might be a worthwhile end in herself, or to see to it that she has a proper sexual release. And, to him, sex appeal is directly proportional to the immensity of a woman's tits. I'm not saying that all American men are this way, but nine out of ten are breast-fixated, wham-bam-thank-you-ma'am cretins who just don't give a damn about anyone's gratification but their own. If you're talking about intellectual and social equality for women, we're not much better off. We're just beginning to break the ice. America is still very much a male-dominated society. Most American men feel threatened sexually unless they're taller than the female, more intellectual, better educated, better paid and higher placed statuswise in the business world. They've got to be the authority, the final word. They say they're looking for a girl just like the girl who married dear old dad, but what they really want, and usually get, is an empty-headed little chick who's very young and very physical — and very submissive. Well, I just can't see either a man or a woman in a dependency position, because from this sort of relationship flows a feeling of superiority on one side and inferiority on the other, and that's a form of slow poison. As I see it, men wouldn't want somebody inferior to them unless they felt inadequate themselves. They're intimidated by a mature woman.

She also expressed her discontent with the women's liberation movement.

=== Holocaust denial ===
In the article "The Shoah: hope springs eternal" in the August 1989 issue of the American Atheist magazine, O'Hair downplayed the Holocaust:

Although it is not generally reported, Auschwitz was simply, first, and foremost, a slave labor camp — and the labor provided was much needed by Farben, Krupp, et al. for the war effort.

In the same article, she claimed that "investigative and scholarly studies undertaken during the last fifty years", such as a book by Paul Rassinier, established that the total number of Jewish victims was between 1 and 1.5 million, adding, "[t]his is a far cry from an alleged 6,000,000", then elaborating on this point:

Over and over again in the analysis of the situation, one compelling fact becomes clear. The Germans had nowhere near the train capacity to haul 6,000,000 people to concentration camp points. Had the Germans attempted to house, clothe, and feed 6,000,000 Jews plus millions of others, the activity would have paralyzed their military operations.

She concluded:

The good news for the Jews of the world is that they did not lose as many of "the clan" as they had thought they lost. Central Europe was, substantially, cleared of Jews, but that was primarily through emigration. The high death rate, from starvation, in the camps during the last months of the war was due largely to the "Allied extermination policies." Perhaps that is why the United States continues to send Israel $6 billion a year as a gift; guilt has its obligation.

== American Atheists ==
After settling in Austin, Texas, O'Hair founded American Atheists in 1963. It identifies as "a nationwide movement which defends the civil rights of non-believers, works for the separation of church and state and addresses issues of First Amendment public policy". She served as the group's first chief executive officer and president until 1986. She was the public voice and face of atheism in the United States during the 1960s and 1970s. Although her son Garth Murray succeeded her officially as president, she retained most of the power and decision making.

In a 1965 interview with Playboy, she described religion as "a crutch" and an "irrational reliance on superstitions and supernatural nonsense". In the same Playboy interview, O'Hair described numerous alleged incidents of harassment, intimidation, and death threats against her and her family. She read several letters she claimed to have received, including one that read (referring to the conversion of Paul the Apostle on the road to Damascus), "May Jesus, who you so vigorously deny, change you into a Paul." O'Hair told the interviewer, "Isn't that lovely? Christine Jorgensen had to go to Sweden for an operation, but me they'll fix with faith — painlessly and for nothing." She said that she left Baltimore because of persecution from residents. She had received mail containing photos smeared with feces, her son Garth's pet kitten was killed, and her home was stoned. She said she thought such events were a catalyst for her father's fatal heart attack.

She filed several lawsuits challenging governmental practices, based on upholding and defining the constitutional separation of church and state. Among these was one against the city of Baltimore's policy of classifying the Catholic Church as a tax-exempt organization in terms of property.

O'Hair founded an atheist radio program, in which she criticized religion and theism. She hosted a television show, American Atheist Forum, which was carried on more than 140 cable television systems.

Arrested for disorderly conduct in Austin in 1977, O'Hair continued to be a polarizing figure into the 1980s. She served as "chief speechwriter" for Larry Flynt's 1984 presidential campaign. She was regularly invited to appear on TV talk shows as a guest. Her second son Garth Murray officially succeeded her as president of the American Atheists, but she was said to retain most of the power. Some chapters seceded from the main group at the time. But as of 2007, American Atheists continued as an active organization with a growing membership.

Her son William J. Murray became a Christian in 1980 and later a Baptist minister, publishing a memoir of his spiritual journey in 1982. Murray O'Hair commented, "One could call this a postnatal abortion on the part of a mother, I guess; I repudiate him entirely and completely for now and all times ... he is beyond human forgiveness."

In 1988, O'Hair produced several issues of Truth Seeker under her masthead as part of an attempt to take over the publication, but the courts ruled against her ownership.

== Court cases ==
O'Hair filed numerous lawsuits in which she argued the separation of church and state had been breached.

- Murray v. Curlett (1963) Challenged Bible reading and prayer recitation in Maryland public schools.
- Murray v. United States (1964) To force the Federal Communications Commission to extend the Fairness Doctrine so that atheists could have equal time with religion on radio and television.
- Murray v. Nixon (1970) Challenged weekly religious services in the White House.
- O'Hair v. Paine (1971) Challenged open readings from the Bible by U.S. astronauts during their spaceflights, spurred by a reading from the book of Genesis by the crew of Apollo 8.
- O'Hair v. Cooke (1977) Challenged the opening prayer at city council meetings in Austin, Texas.
- O'Hair v. Blumenthal (1978) Challenged the inclusion of the phrase "In God We Trust" on U.S. currency.
- O'Hair v. Hill (1978) To have removed from the Texas constitution a provision requiring a belief in God of persons holding offices of public trust.
- O'Hair v. Andrus (1979) Challenged the use of National Park facilities for the Pope to hold a Roman Catholic mass on the Mall in Washington, D.C.
- O'Hair v. Clements (1980) To have removed the nativity scene displayed in the rotunda of the capitol building in Austin, Texas.
- Carter, et al. v Broadlawns Medical Center, et al. (1984–1987) Challenged the full-time employment of an unordained chaplain at a tax-funded county hospital, Broadlawns Medical Centre in Des Moines, Iowa.

== Kidnapping and murder ==
In the 1990s, American Atheists staff consisted of O'Hair, her son Jon Garth Murray, and her granddaughter Robin Murray O'Hair, and a handful of support personnel. The trio lived in O'Hair's large home. On August 27, 1995, the O'Hairs disappeared from their home and office. A typewritten note was attached to the locked office door, saying "The Murray O'Hair family has been called out of town on an emergency basis. We do not know how long we will be gone at the time of the writing of this memo." When police entered O'Hair's home, it looked as if they had left suddenly. The trio said in phone calls that they were on "business" in San Antonio, Texas. Garth Murray ordered US$600,000 worth of gold coins from a San Antonio jeweler, but took delivery of only $500,000 worth of coins.

Until September 27, American Atheists employees received several mobile phone calls from Robin and Jon, but neither explained why they had left or when they would return; employees reported that their voices sounded strained and disturbed. After September 28, no further communication came from any of the three. American Atheists was facing serious financial problems because of the withdrawal of funds, and membership dwindled in the face of an apparent scandal. There was speculation that the trio had disappeared in order to conceal its assets or avoid being contacted by creditors.

=== Investigation and arrests ===
During the case, The Austin Chronicle reporter Robert Bryce criticized the relative lack of action by the Austin Police Department, even when they were contacted by O'Hair's estranged son William J. Murray. He noted that the investigation was being led by agents of the Internal Revenue Service (with whom American Atheists had a long-running dispute over taxes owed), the Federal Bureau of Investigation (due to the possibility of the O'Hairs having absconded with organizational funds), and the Dallas County Sheriff's Office (where Danny Fry's headless, limbless corpse was found in October 1995, but had been unidentifiable until February 1999). Bryce, William Murray, ABC Nightline reporter Valeri Williams and San Antonio Express-News reporter John MacCormack, amongst others, felt that little official effort went into the investigation because the authorities preferred to believe that the theft and disappearance was simply an internal American Atheists matter.

In 1999, nearly four years after the August 1995 disappearances, continued prodding and investigative leads from the various reporters finally led the official investigation to focus on David Roland Waters, a felon with a violent history who had started working for American Atheists in 1993. In May 1995, Waters had pleaded guilty to stealing $54,000 from the organization in 1994. When Waters received a lenient sentence, O'Hair published an article in the American Atheists newsletter in which she exposed the theft of the money – along with his previous crimes. O'Hair claimed that, at the age of 17, Waters had killed another teenager and had been sentenced to eight years in prison. When the authorities finally pursued the Waters connection in 1999, Waters' former girlfriend, Patty Steffens, confirmed that Waters had vowed violent revenge after reading O'Hair's article.

Federal agents for the FBI and the IRS, along with local police, concluded that Waters and his accomplices (Gary Paul Karr and Danny Fry) had kidnapped all three Murray/O'Hair family members, forced them to withdraw the missing funds, gone on several shopping sprees with their money and credit cards, and killed and dismembered all three. A few days after O'Hair and her son and granddaughter were killed, Waters and Karr killed Fry. His body was found on a riverbed in rural Dallas County in October 1995, but his head and hands were missing; as a result, his remains were not identified for three and a half years, when reporter MacCormack's own investigation led him to suggest that the body might be Fry's.

A search warrant was executed on the apartment of Waters and his girlfriend. The search revealed ammunition of various calibers; Waters, a convicted felon, was not allowed this material and he was arrested, while the contents of his apartment were seized. At the same time, Gary Karr was contacted in Walled Lake, Michigan, and interviewed. Having served the last 30 years in prison for kidnapping a judge's daughter, Karr would not talk. He had his rights read to him and he asked for permission to listen to the information which was being discussed. Karr then decided to talk and implicated Waters in the deaths of Murray and the two O'Hairs. Karr signed an affidavit and drew a map so that the police could find the bodies. Karr was arrested and taken to jail for possession of two firearms. He was held in Detroit, awaiting trial. The weapon charge was dismissed, and Karr was transferred to the custody of the United States Marshals in Austin because he needed to be tried for the deaths of the O'Hairs.

In June 2000, nearly a full five years after the murders, a three-week trial found Karr guilty of conspiracy to commit extortion, traveling interstate in order to commit violent acts, money laundering, and interstate transportation of stolen property: all charges related to the O'Hair case. He was acquitted of conspiring to kidnap the O'Hairs, because the authorities had failed to locate any bodies. In August 2000, Karr was sentenced to two life terms in prison by U.S. District Judge Sam Sparks.

Waters was arrested and prosecuted; in a January 2001 plea agreement solely on the charge of conspiracy, he agreed to lead authorities to the site where the dismembered bodies of the O'Hairs had been burned and buried. He was sentenced to serve 20 years in federal prison, which he had requested, because he did not want to serve time for his earlier theft conviction in Texas state prison. He did not go on trial for the kidnapping and murder of the three members of the O'Hair family. He was also ordered to pay back a total of $543,665 to American Atheists and the estates of Madalyn Murray O'Hair, Jon Garth Murray, and Robin Murray O'Hair. It is unlikely that any part of these debts were ever paid, because Waters was not able to earn any money while he was in prison. Waters died of lung cancer on January 27, 2003, at the Federal Medical Center in Butner, North Carolina.

When Waters, under the plea agreement, led federal agents to the O'Hairs' burial site on a Texas ranch, they discovered that the legs of all three of the victims had been cut off with a saw. The remains had suffered such extensive mutilation and decomposition that officials had to identify them through dental records, DNA testing and, in Madalyn O'Hair's case, by matching the serial number on a prosthetic hip to records from Brackenridge Hospital in Austin. The head and hands of Danny Fry were also found at the site. Eventually, Bill Murray (as the closest surviving relative) was granted custody of the remains and buried them at an undisclosed location and (in accordance with his Baptist beliefs) did not pray for the dead; however, some of those who were with him did pray for remaining family members and law enforcement officials who had worked on the case.

In 1995, Waters and his girlfriend had put the gold coins, which he and his accomplices had extorted from the O'Hairs, in an unsecured storage locker which had been rented by the girlfriend. It only had a cheap padlock. Waters had taken some of the coins and for a few days, he partied with Gary Karr and his former wife. When he returned to the locker, he discovered that the remaining gold coins (American Gold Eagles, Maple Leaf coins, and Krugerrands) had all been stolen. A group of thieves from San Antonio who were operating in that area had gained keys to the type of lock which had been used by Waters' girlfriend. In the course of their activities, the thieves had come across the locker, used a key to open it, and found the suitcase full of gold coins. They returned to San Antonio, and with the help of friends, they exchanged the gold coins for cash. The thieves and friends went to Las Vegas for a weekend. All but one coin, which had been given as a pendant gift to an aunt, were spent by these thieves. That last coin was recovered by the FBI after a Memorial Day 1999 public appeal.

== Legacy ==
Murray's 1960 lawsuit against the Baltimore City School System was later consolidated with a similar one from Pennsylvania, when these reached the US Supreme Court on appeal. The Court ruled in 1963 (in Abington School District v. Schempp) that school-sponsored Bible reading in public schools in the United States was unconstitutional. This decision gradually resulted in the end of religious activities sponsored by public schools. Non-religious students had been expected to participate in such activities, and state-level policies varied.

O'Hair's embrace of conspiracy theories led later atheists to distance themselves from her.

In 2012, a memorial brick for Murray, her son Jon, and her granddaughter Robin was placed at Lou Neff Point in Zilker Park in Austin, Texas.

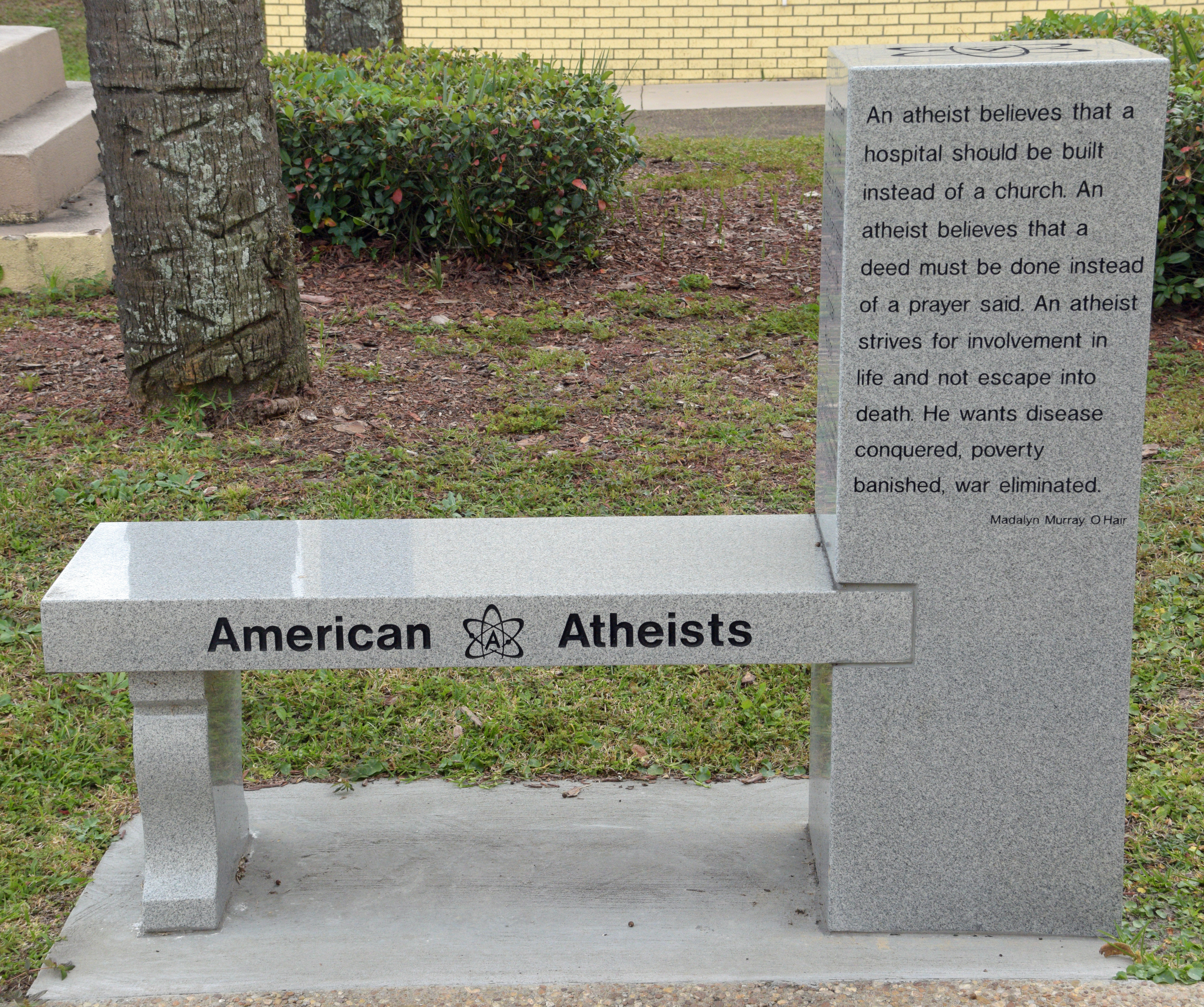
The side of the American Atheists granite bench and plinth at the Bradford County Courthouse, Florida, showing a quote by O'Hair

In 2013, the first atheist monument to be erected on American government property was unveiled at the Bradford County Courthouse in Florida, where other residents had installed a monument to religious ideals (in this case, a replica of the Ten Commandments). It is a 1,500-pound granite bench and plinth inscribed with quotes by O'Hair, Thomas Jefferson, and Benjamin Franklin.

O'Hair was incorporated into a popular urban legend stemming from an erroneous characterization of RM-2493, a proposal made to the Federal Communications Commission (FCC) in 1974. The purpose of the proposal was to prevent organizations from making religious broadcasts on stations licensed for educational use. False rumors spread that O'Hair was a proponent of RM-2493, and that its intent was to ban the broadcast of religious services, and the reading of the Bible over the airwaves. The FCC's denial of RM-2493 in 1975, and O'Hair's later disappearance and murder, did little to stem the spread of the legend, which still claimed years later that O'Hair was pushing an active FCC proposal. Subsequent iterations of the rumor included allegations that O'Hair was campaigning to remove Christmas programs and songs from public schools and "office buildings". Other variations mentioned specific religious leaders who were supposedly being targeted for removal from the airwaves, or stated that the television series Touched by an Angel was threatened with cancellation because of the proposal. Evangelical Christian leader James Dobson became falsely associated with the legend as well, purportedly leading opposition to the FCC petition. As of 2015, the FCC was still receiving dozens of correspondences relating to O'Hair every month.

== Popular culture ==
In 1981, the country music group The Statler Brothers released the song "Don't Wait on Me", which humorously compiles a list of events that are highly unlikely to ever happen, one of these being "when they ordain Madeline O'Hair and she becomes a priest", a reference to her affinity for atheism.

The December 2002 episode "Without a Prayer", of the series Forensic Files, deals with the disappearance and deaths of O'Hair, her son and her granddaughter.

The October 2004 episode "Eosphoros", of the series Law & Order: Criminal Intent, is loosely based on O'Hair's murder.

A 2017 Netflix movie, The Most Hated Woman in America, is a loose dramatization of O'Hair's life. It focuses on the abductions and killings of O'Hair and two family members in 1995.

== Books by or about Murray O'Hair ==
- O'Hair, Madalyn Murray (1988). All about Atheists (American Atheist Radio Series). American Atheist Press. ISBN 978-0910309448.
- O'Hair, Madalyn Murray (1978). Atheist Primer: Did You Know All the Gods Came from the Same Place?. American Atheist Press. ISBN 978-0911826104.
- Dracos, Ted (2010). UnGodly: The Passions, Torments, and Murder of Atheist Madalyn Murray O'Hair. Simon and Schuster. ISBN 978-1439119969.
- Murray, William J. (1982). My Life without God. T. Nelson. ISBN 0840752563.
- Murray, Jon Garth (1986). All the Questions You Ever Wanted to Ask American Atheists With All the Answers. American Atheist Press. ISBN 978-0910309035.
- O'Hair, Madalyn Murray (1972). What on Earth Is an Atheist!. American Atheist Press. ISBN 978-1578849185.
- O'Hair, Madalyn Murray (1991). Why I Am an Atheist: Including a History of Materialism. American Atheist Press. ISBN 978-0910309981.

== See also ==
- Charles E. Stevens American Atheist Library and Archives

Preceded by None	President of American Atheists; 1963–1986 (de jure); 1986–1995 (de facto) (passed title to Jon Garth Murray in 1986, but remained de facto President until both their murders)	Succeeded by Jon Garth Murray
