= Zellers v. Huff =

1948 American legal case

The Dixon School Case (Zellers v. Huff) was a lawsuit started in 1948 in New Mexico contesting the use of nuns, religious brothers and priests as teachers in publicly supported schools under the First Amendment to the United States Constitution. The case involved thirty schools in eleven New Mexico counties, twenty-eight plaintiffs, two hundred defendants, and public expenditures to the schools of over $600,000 annually. Following on the heels of the U.S. Supreme Court's decision in Everson v. Board of Education, which applied First Amendment freedoms to state as well as federal law, the Dixon School Case was the first state case to implement separation of church and state in public schools, and was watched with interest nationally.

== History ==
In Dixon, New Mexico in 1941, the school board closed the public school and recognized the parochial St. Joseph's Catholic School as the only public school in the jurisdiction. Protestant parents complained to no avail, and then formed the Dixon Free Schools Committee under the leadership of one Lydia Zellers. After getting nowhere with state and local officials, the group filed suit in April 1948. The dispute had become broader than just the Dixon school district and included twenty-nine other schools across the state. The first named defendant was Raymond Huff, the chairman of the New Mexico Board of Education. The defendants included Governor Thomas J. Mabry, as well as 145 priests, nuns and brothers of Catholic religious orders.

The initial trial was held on September 27 to October 7, 1948, in the district court in Santa Fe, New Mexico, before Judge E. Turner Hensley of Portales. Judge Hensley ruled that the teachers and administrators had failed to uphold the separation of church and state and that the religious teachings and settings had significant indoctrinating influence on the students. After additional hearings in spring 1949 he granted an injunction against the Roman Catholic Church prohibiting 139 named religious members from teaching in state schools. The church appealed to the New Mexico Supreme Court which upheld Judge Hensley's rulings in September 1951, but broadened the ruling to include a prohibition against wearing religious garb as a teacher, doctrinaire textbooks in public schools, public transport to parochial schools, and publicly provided textbooks in parochial schools.

Both the Catholic Church and the state of New Mexico declined to take an appeal to the Supreme Court of the United States.

The prohibition on publicly provided textbooks was overturned in 2018 in Moses v. Ruszkowski after the U.S. Supreme Court vacated the decision in Moses v. Skanders, and asked that it be reconsidered in light of Trinity Lutheran Church of Columbia, Inc. v. Comer.
