= Jon Garth Murray =

American atheism activist (1954–1995)

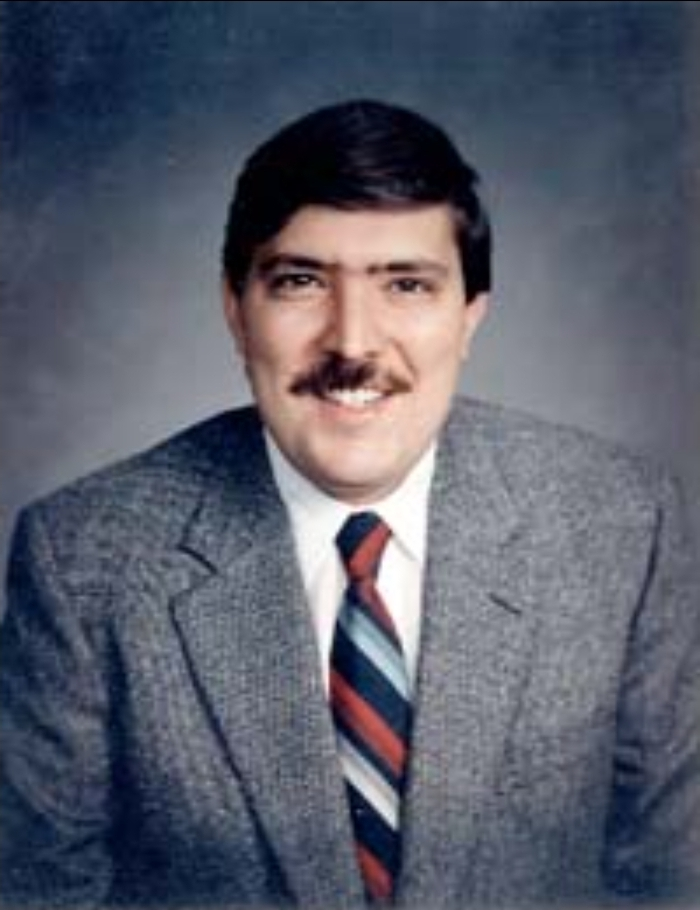

President of American Atheists
- In office 1986–1995
- Preceded by: Madalyn Murray O'Hair
- Succeeded by: Ellen Johnson

Personal details
- Born: November 16, 1954 Baltimore, Maryland, U.S.
- Died: September 29, 1995 (aged 40) San Antonio, Texas, U.S.
- Cause of death: Murder
- Relations: William J. Murray (half-brother); Robin Murray O'Hair (niece; deceased)
- Parent(s): Michael Fiorillo; Madalyn Murray O'Hair (deceased)
- Known for: Son of Madalyn Murray O'Hair; American Atheists

Jon Garth Murray (November 16, 1954 – September 29, 1995) served as the first male president of American Atheists, a non-governmental organization that lobbied on the separation of church and state. He was the second son of Madalyn Murray O'Hair, an activist who founded American Atheists in 1963 and served as its first president. He was the half-brother of William J. Murray.

== Career and activism ==
From 1986 until his death in 1995, Murray held the de jure office of President of American Atheists. It was a title without power, however, as his mother retained authoritative control behind-the-scenes.

== Personal life and death ==
Jon Garth Murray (Note: According to the autobiography of his estranged half-brother, Jon was called "Garth" by his family, although he was usually referred to as Jon in the media.) was born in Baltimore, Maryland in 1954, the son of Madalyn Murray O'Hair and Michael Fiorillo, her boyfriend at the time. It is likely that Jon Garth never met his father. In 1960 his mother filed a lawsuit against the Baltimore public school system, naming his older half-brother William J. Murray as plaintiff. Consolidated with another case, it reached the United States Supreme Court on appeal, which ruled that mandatory public Bible readings in public schools were unconstitutional.

That year his mother founded American Atheists and served for decades as the first president. Murray also worked for the organization as an adult.

He is thought to have had only one, short-lived relationship with a woman. He was a tall, heavyset man and had a speech impairment. He was living with his mother Madalyn in 1995, together with his niece Robin Murray O'Hair in Austin, Texas. (His mother had adopted her granddaughter Robin, making her Jon Garth's adopted sister.)

In 1995, Murray, his mother, and his niece Robin were all kidnapped and killed in San Antonio by David Roland Waters, a former employee of American Atheists. Waters committed these crimes in association with two other men.

== Remembrance ==
In 2012, a memorial brick for Murray, his mother Madalyn Murray O'Hair, and his niece Robin was placed at Lou Neff Point in Zilker Park in Austin, Texas.

== Notes ==
Preceded by Madalyn Murray O'Hair	President of American Atheists; 1986–1995 (de jure) (Jon Garth Murray held office as President in 1986 but Murray O'Hair, who was de jure President from its founding in 1963 until 1986, remained de facto President until both their murders in 1995)	Succeeded by Ellen Johnson
