= Smith v. Board of School Commissioners of Mobile County =

Lawsuit

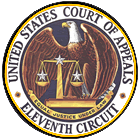
- Court: United States Court of Appeals for the Eleventh Circuit
- Full case name: Douglas T. Smith, et al v. Board of School Commissioners of Mobile County, et al
- Decided: August 26, 1987
- Citations: 827 F.2d 684 (11th Cir. 1987); 103 A.L.R.Fed. 517; 56 USLW 2143; 41 Ed. Law Rep. 452

Case history
- Prior history: 655 F. Supp. 939 (S.D. Ala. 1987)

Court membership
- Judges sitting: Frank Minis Johnson, Thomas Alonzo Clark, Joe Eaton (S.D. Fla.)

Case opinions
- Majority: Johnson, joined by Clark, Eaton

Laws applied
- First Amendment

Smith v. Board of School Commissioners of Mobile County, 827 F.2d 684 (11th Cir. 1987), was a lawsuit in which the United States Court of Appeals for the Eleventh Circuit held that the Mobile County Public School System could use textbooks which purportedly promoted "secular humanism", characterized by the complainants as a religion.

Parents and other citizens brought a lawsuit against the school board, alleging that the school system was teaching the tenets of secular humanism, an anti-theistic religion. The complainants asked that 44 different elementary through high school level textbooks be removed from the curriculum. After an initial ruling in a federal district court in favor of the plaintiffs, the U.S. Court of Appeals for the Eleventh Circuit ruled that as long as the school was motivated by a secular purpose, it did not matter whether the curriculum and texts shared ideas held by one or more religious groups. The Court found that the texts in question promoted important secular values (tolerance, self-respect, logical decision making), and thus the use of the textbooks neither unconstitutionally advanced a nontheistic religion nor inhibited theistic religions.

This case is occasionally, and incorrectly, cited as proving that "secular humanism" is a religion. The text below shows the Circuit Court, in overturning the District Court decision, made no such finding. They both set aside the question as moot and offered that even if it were (and they were not saying it is), the teaching of science is not invalidated purely because of its association with secular humanism. Excerpt below from the Circuit Court decision (cited earlier):

The Supreme Court has never established a comprehensive test for determining the "delicate question" of what constitutes a religious belief for purposes of the first amendment, and we need not attempt to do so in this case, for we find that, even assuming that secular humanism is a religion for purposes of the establishment clause, Appellees have failed to prove a violation of the establishment clause through the use in the Alabama public schools of the textbooks at issue in this case.

== Background ==
According to Dreilinger, the 1980s were an era where the religious right brought home economics into the culture wars. In the 1980s, the Heritage Foundation published a pamphlet attacking the American Home Economics Association for a broad definition of the word "family" and for encouraging children to make their own choices.

In 1986, an Alabama federal court heard a class-action suit which challenged the materials in 44 textbooks. Five of them, which were on home economics, were deemed the worst by a prosecutor. The case drew national attention from the start, with the National Legal Foundation funding the prosecution. In response, the ACLU and the People for the American Way funded a defense team to work with the state school board's attorney. At the time, Pat Robertson was seeking the Republican presidential nomination, and was also the founder of the National Legal Foundation. The judge hearing the case, W. Brevard Hand, was described as a hero for the religious right. The plaintiffs charged that the books established a religion of secular humanism which gave no reason to believe in God. They attacked the home economics topic of "values clarification" - a favorite topic of home economics leader Satenig St. Marie - for venturing too far away from what the plaintiffs viewed as home economics topics like sewing and cooking. The defense focused on religious liberty claims rather than accept help from the American Home Economics Association, and gathered Christian witnesses for that purpose.

Many of the academic experts on both the prosecution and defense sides of the case admitted they had not read the books, had not seen a home economics class, nor had their children taken home economics.

In this first ruling on March 3, 1987, Judge Hand stated that secular humanism was a religion and that the textbooks unconstitutionally promoted it. The ruling also said that the textbooks had to be removed from the classrooms. A few months later, over the objection of Alabama governor Guy Hunt, the appellate court overturned the verdict.

== Books in question ==
The textbooks in the case were divided by the plaintiffs into three categories: books on home economics, history, and social studies.

Home economics

- Caring, Deciding and Growing by Helen McGinley (Ginn and Company, 1983)
- Contemporary Living by Verdene Ryder (Goodheart-Willcox, 1981, 1985)
- Homemaking: Skills for Everyday Living by Frances Baynor Parnell (Goodheart-Willcox, 1981, 1984)
- Teen Guide by Valerie Chamberlain (McGraw Hill, 1985)
- Today's Teen by Joan Kelly (Bennett & McKnight, 1981)

History

- America Is by Frank Freidel (Charles E. Merrill, 1978)
- The American Dream by Lew Smith (Scott, Foresman, 1980)
- Exploring Our Nation's History by Sidney Schwartz (Globe, 1984)
- History of a Free People by Henry W. Bragdon (Macmillan, 1981)
- A History of Our American Republic by Glenn M. Linden (Laidlaw Brothers, 1981)
- Our American Heritage by Herbert J. Bass (Silver Burdett, 1979)
- People and Our Country by Norman K. Risjord (Holt, Rinehart & Winston, 1978)
- Rise of the American Nation by Lewis Paul Todd (Harcourt Brace Jovanovich, 1977)
- These United States by James P. Shenton (Houghton Mifflin, 1981)

Social studies

- Rand McNally Series (1980 editions)
  - You and Me
  - Here We Are
  - Our Land
  - Where On Earth
  - Across America
  - World Views
- Scott Foresman Series (1979 editions)
  - Social Studies (grades 1–6)
- Speck (1981 editions)
  - Our Family
  - Our Neighbors
  - Our Communities
  - Our Country Today
  - Our Country's History
  - Our World Today
- Laidlaw (1981 editions)
  - Understanding People
  - Understanding Families
  - Understanding Communities
  - Understanding Regions of the Earth

== See also ==
- Wallace v. Jaffree: another case involving the Mobile schools and religion
