= Wallace v. Jaffree =

- Supreme Court of the United States

Argued December 4, 1984 Decided June 4, 1985
- Full case name: Wallace, Governor of Alabama, et al. v. Jaffree, et al.
- Citations: 472 U.S. 38 (more) 105 S. Ct. 2479; 86 L. Ed. 2d 29; 1985 U.S. LEXIS 91; 53 U.S.L.W. 4665

Case history
- Prior: Preliminary injunction granted, Jaffree v. James, 544 F. Supp. 727 (S.D. Ala. 1982); statute upheld, Jaffree v. Board of School Comm'rs of Mobile County, 554 F. Supp. 1104 (S.D. Ala. 1983); reversed, Jaffree v. Wallace, 705 F.2d 1526 (11th Cir. 1983).
- Subsequent: Smith v. Board of School Comm'rs of Mobile County, 827 F.2d 684 (11th Cir. 1987); 837 F.2d 1461 (11th Cir. 1988)

Holding
- State endorsement of prayer activities in schools is prohibited by the First Amendment.

Court membership
- Chief Justice Warren E. Burger Associate Justices William J. Brennan Jr. · Byron White; Thurgood Marshall · Harry Blackmun; Lewis F. Powell Jr. · William Rehnquist; John P. Stevens · Sandra Day O'Connor

Case opinions
- Majority: Stevens, joined by Brennan, Marshall, Blackmun, Powell
- Concurrence: Powell
- Concurrence: O'Connor (in judgment)
- Dissent: Burger
- Dissent: White
- Dissent: Rehnquist

Laws applied
- U.S. Const. amend. I

Wallace v. Jaffree, 472 U.S. 38 (1985), was a United States Supreme Court case deciding on the issue of silent school prayer.

== Background ==
An Alabama law authorized teachers to set aside one minute at the start of each day for a moment for "meditation or voluntary prayer".

Ishmael Jaffree, an American citizen, was a resident of Mobile County, Alabama, and a parent of three students who attended school in the Mobile County Public School System; two of the three children were in the second grade and the third was in kindergarten. His youngest was being made fun of by peers because he refused to say the prayers.

On May 28, 1982, Jaffree brought a lawsuit naming the Mobile County School Board, various school officials, and the minor plaintiffs' three teachers as defendants. Jaffree sought a declaratory judgment and an injunction restraining the defendants from "maintaining or allowing the maintenance of regular religious prayer services or other forms of religious observances in the Mobile County Public Schools in violation of the First Amendment as made applicable to states by the Fourteenth Amendment to the United States Constitution".

Jaffree's complaint further alleged that two of his children had been subjected to various acts of religious indoctrination and that the defendant teachers had led their classes in saying certain prayers in unison on a daily basis; that as a result of not participating in the prayers his minor children had been exposed to ostracism from their peer group classmates; and that Jaffree had repeatedly but unsuccessfully requested that the prayers be stopped.

The original complaint mentioned no specific statutes, but the case later dealt with three laws for public schools in Alabama:

- The first law (1978) created a minute of silence for meditation.
- The second law (1981) added the option of voluntary prayer.
- The third law (1982) authorized teachers to recite a prayer with "willing students".

Despite initially granting a preliminary injunction, the U.S. District Court for the Southern District of Alabama ultimately allowed the practice, found in favor of the defendants and upheld all three laws. The United States Court of Appeals for the Eleventh Circuit also upheld the 1978 law but reversed with respect to the laws from 1981 and 1982 by holding them unconstitutional.

== Decision ==
The Supreme Court ruled 6-3 that the Alabama laws from 1981 and 1982 violated the US Constitution, but it upheld the law from 1978 that enabled a minute of silence for meditation in public schools of Alabama. Justice John Paul Stevens wrote the majority opinion and was joined by Justices William J. Brennan, Jr., Thurgood Marshall, Harry Blackmun, and Lewis Powell. Justice Powell wrote a separate concurring opinion, and Justice Sandra Day O'Connor wrote an opinion concurring in the judgment. Chief Justice Warren E. Burger and Associate Justices William H. Rehnquist (later Chief Justice) and Byron White each issued a dissenting opinion. Rehnquist asserted that the Court's reasoning was flawed inasmuch as it was based on the writings of Thomas Jefferson, who was not the author of the Establishment Clause.

The Court first noted that "the proposition that the several States have no greater power to restrain the individual freedoms protected by the First Amendment than does Congress is firmly embedded in our constitutional jurisprudence" and that "the First Amendment was adopted to curtail Congress' power to interfere with the individual's freedom to believe, to worship, and to express himself in accordance with the dictates of his own conscience". The Lemon test, which had been created by the Court to determine whether legislation violates the Establishment Clause, included as a factor that "the statute must have a secular legislative purpose". The Court further held in Jaffree that "the First Amendment requires that a statute must be invalidated if it is entirely motivated by a purpose to advance religion".

The record in the case shows that the Alabama law "was not motivated by any clearly secular purpose" but also that "indeed, the statute had no secular purpose". With no secular purpose behind the law, which expanded a previous law that already allowed for meditation so that it now explicitly included "voluntary prayer" as well, the only possible conclusion was that the new law had been passed "for the sole purpose of expressing the State's endorsement of prayer activities for one minute at the beginning of each school-day."

"Such an endorsement is not consistent with the established principle that the government must pursue a course of complete neutrality toward religion" and so the Court ruled in favor of Jaffree and upheld the Eleventh Circuit's decision.

== Dissents ==
=== Chief Justice Burger ===
In his dissent to the US Supreme Court case, Wallace v. Jaffree, Chief Justice Burger expressed several reasons for his opinion that the Court decided incorrectly. He began by pointing out that the statute authorizing a moment of silence at the beginning of a school day, which mentioned the word "prayer," did not unconstitutionally promote a religion. He maintained that the ruling against that statute was directly aggressive and intimidating to religion, which is as unconstitutional as a candid establishment of religion. Also in his first point, he contested the decision with the point that a school is constitutionally on the same level of government as state and federal legislatures and even the Supreme Court. Thus, the endorsement of a "moment of silence" with an oblique suggestion of prayer is no less constitutional as is the opening of Congress or a court session with a prayer by a publicly funded chaplain.

In his next point, Burger emphasized the tenuousness of the Court's peripheral reasoning by specifically including the statements of the statute's sponsor and the differences between the statute and its predecessor statute. Upon the subject of the statute's sponsor's comments, he raised many points that work to invalidate the use of the statements as evidence for the original intent of the legislature at the time of the statute's enactment. Firstly, he mentioned that those statements were made by the sponsor after the legislature's vote on the bill and that the legislature did not in all likelihood know any portion of his views enough to claim his motives to be those of the entire legislature. He also brought attention to the fact that the same legislator also stated that one of his purposes was to resolve a misunderstanding that silent, individual prayer was unconstitutionally prohibited.

Next, Burger discussed the differences between the debated statute and its predecessor by bringing up the Court's opinion that the inclusion of the phrase "or voluntary prayer" endorsed and promoted religion. He stated that the Court's reasoning relied upon the removal of the phrase from its context. He compared that addition to the addition of the phrase "under God" to the Pledge of Allegiance and contested that the Court's logic would also condemn the Pledge of Allegiance as unconstitutional and so was discernibly preposterous. He suggested that when taken in context, the phrase "or voluntary prayer" was perfectly constitutional as a measure to prevent the unconstitutional prohibition of individual prayer.

Burger, in his third point, called out the Court's use of the "Lemon Test as an indolent attempt to apply a test that was "one size fits all" to a less-than-standard case. He suggested that the use of the test ignored the Court's duty to examine the statute against the ideas of the Establishment Clause and that the decision of the case clearly showed that shortcoming.

In his conclusion, Justice Burger reiterated the fact that the statute was not an unconstitutional endorsement and promotion of religion that sought to establish a state church but an entirely-constitutional measure designed to prevent truly-unconstitutional infringements upon the rights of students to pray individually as they please.

=== Justice Rehnquist ===
Justice Rehnquist's dissenting opinion relied heavily upon pointing out the faults behind the common misunderstanding of Thomas Jefferson's statements about the "wall of separation of church and state" in his letter to the Danbury Baptist Association. Rehnquist began by explaining that the Establishment Clause has been closely linked with Jefferson's letter since Everson v. Board of Education.

Rehnquist called attention to the fact that Jefferson did not write the letter until 14 years after the amendments to the US Constitution had been ratified and that Jefferson then resided in France. Thus, Rehnquist considered that Jefferson to be a less-than-ideal source of background on the Establishment Clause, regardless of Jefferson's intended meaning.

Justice Rehnquist suggested instead to turn to the actions of the Congress and James Madison's significant role in it for insight into the original intent of the Establishment Clause. He continued by referencing the debates of the colonies' ratification conventions.

He pointed out the fact that the states frequently opposed the ratification of the Constitution was the lack of a Bill of Rights. Those who upon that basis opposed ratification thought that the government, without such an enumeration of rights, had a great potential to follow the authoritarian path that they wished to avoid.

To solve the impasse, Madison urged Congress to consider his draft of amendments. After some time of debate and revision, a version what is now the First Amendment was created: "No religion shall be established by law, nor shall the equal rights of conscience be infringed."

That version was met with opposition by many representatives as it could be construed "to abolish religion altogether" or "to be taken in such latitude as to be extremely hurtful to the cause of religion." It was on that basis that the final version of the amendment was selected and ratified. Thus, Rehnquist stated that it is indisputable that the spirit in which the Congress approved the Establishment Clause was one of open-minded toleration, not hostility towards religion.

He then brings up Thomas Jefferson's reasoning for not issuing a Thanksgiving Proclamation. Jefferson said that partaking in prayer and religious exercises are acts of individual discipline and that the right to those activities can never be safer than in the hands of the people. Rehnquist maintained that the meaning of the Establishment Clause was a preventative measure to keep the government from establishing a religion, not to prevent the individual freedom to follow one's own beliefs.

In his conclusion, Rehnquist denounced the Lemon Test as "having no more grounding in the First Amendment than the wall theory created from 'separation of church and state' " in Everson v. Board of Education. He says that because it has no basis in the amendment that it is designed to interpret, it cannot yield predictably constitutional results when applied to a statute.

== See also ==
- Engel v. Vitale (1962): the earlier precedent on school prayer
- Smith v. Board of School Commissioners of Mobile County (11th Cir. 1987): another case involving the Mobile schools and religion
- List of United States Supreme Court cases, volume 472
