= Engel v. Vitale =

- Supreme Court of the United States

Argued April 3, 1962 Decided June 25, 1962
- Full case name: Steven I. Engel, et al. v. William J. Vitale, Jr., et al.
- Citations: 370 U.S. 421 (more) 82 S. Ct. 1261; 8 L. Ed. 2d 601; 1962 U.S. LEXIS 847; 20 Ohio Op. 2d 328; 86 A.L.R.2d 1285
- Related cases: Abington School District v. Schempp
- Argument: Oral argument

Case history
- Prior: 191 N.Y.S.2d 453 (Sup. Ct. 1959), aff'd, 206 N.Y.S.2d 183 (App. Div. 1960), aff'd, 176 N.E.2d 579 (N.Y. 1961); cert. granted, 368 U.S. 924 (1961).
- Subsequent: 186 N.E.2d 124 (N.Y. 1962)

Holding
- Recitation of a government-written prayer in public schools violates the Establishment Clause of the First Amendment, even if the prayer is denominationally neutral and students may remain silent or be excused from the classroom during its recitation.

Court membership
- Chief Justice Earl Warren Associate Justices Hugo Black · Felix Frankfurter; William O. Douglas · Tom C. Clark; John M. Harlan II · William J. Brennan Jr. Potter Stewart · Byron White

Case opinions
- Majority: Black, joined by Warren, Douglas, Clark, Harlan, Brennan
- Concurrence: Douglas
- Dissent: Stewart
- Frankfurter and White took no part in the consideration or decision of the case.

Laws applied
- U.S. Const. amend. I

Engel v. Vitale, 370 U.S. 421 (1962), was a landmark United States Supreme Court case in which the Court ruled that it is unconstitutional for state officials to compose an official school prayer and encourage its recitation in public schools, due to violation of the First Amendment. The ruling has been the subject of intense debate.

== Background ==
Religion in New York public schools had a long, contentious history, with protests against religious messaging dating back to at least 1906.

In November 1951, the Board of Regents of New York proposed that public schools start the day with a non-denominational prayer. School boards were authorized, but not required, to adopt the recommendation. It became known as The Regents' Prayer because it was written by the New York State Board of Regents. The prayer was twenty-two words that went as follows:

Almighty God, we acknowledge our dependence upon Thee, and we beg Thy blessings upon us, our parents, our teachers and our country. Amen.

The Herricks Union Free School District adopted the proposal in July 1958. Students could opt out with a parent's signature. Five parents of public school students attending Herricks High School in New Hyde Park sued the school board president William J. Vitale Jr., challenging the constitutionality of the Regents' Prayer. Two of the plaintiffs were Jewish, one was an atheist, one was a Unitarian church member, and one was a member of the New York Society for Ethical Culture. Steven I. Engel, a Jewish man, became the lead plaintiff.

The plaintiffs argued that opening the school day with such a prayer violates the Establishment Clause of the First Amendment to the United States Constitution as applied to the states through the Fourteenth Amendment. The governments of twenty-two states submitted an amicus curiae brief to the Supreme Court urging affirmance of the New York Court of Appeals decision which upheld the constitutionality of the prayer. The American Jewish Committee, the Synagogue Council of America, and the American Ethical Union each submitted briefs urging the Court to instead reverse and rule that the prayer was unconstitutional.

== Lower court history ==
Bernard S. Meyer wrote the trial court opinion ruling that the Establishment Clause "does not prohibit the non-compulsory saying of the Regents' prayer in the public schools". Meyer's reasoning was based on the "accepted practice" at the time the amendments were adopted:

The reason the 'establishment' clause is not breached is ... because traditionally, and particularly at the time of the adoption of the First and Fourteenth Amendments, this was the accepted practice.

Aside from the historical analysis, the trial court relied on the Supreme Court precedent in Zorach v. Clauson:

The Zorach case holds that the Constitution does not require separation in every and all respects and, as we have seen, constitutional history confirms a tradition of prayer, including prayer in the schools...the instant prayer, at least when its recitation is limited to daily exercises at the opening of school, must be classified as outside McCollum's proscription of religious instruction and within Zorach's sanction as an accommodation.

The Appellate Division for the Second Department affirmed the trial court's judgment in a per curiam opinion. George Beldock wrote a separate opinion, concurring in part, and dissenting in part. Beldock said the decision should not be based on whether school prayer was an "accepted practice" at the time the amendments were adopted. Instead, citing Church of the Holy Trinity v. United States, and supported by additional reasoning in Zorach v. Clauson, Beldock argued that the Establishment Clause was not violated because "an accommodation of secular education to the voluntary prayer or confession of religious faith" was not a religious teaching or instruction and merely reaffirmed "that this is a religious nation".

On further appeal, the divided New York Court of Appeals agreed with the lower state courts that the Regents' prayer could be read in public schools without violating the Establishment Clause as long as student participation was voluntary. The courts said the prayer was constitutional because of the opt-out provision.

== Supreme Court of the United States ==
In a 6–1 decision (Justices Felix Frankfurter and Byron White did not participate), the Supreme Court held that reciting government-written prayers in public schools was unconstitutional, violating the Establishment Clause of the First Amendment.

=== Majority opinion ===
Writing for the majority, Justice Hugo Black wrote that recitation of a government-written prayer by school children was "a practice wholly inconsistent with the Establishment Clause" that breached the "wall of separation between Church and State". Even though the prayer is "non-denominational" and voluntary the Court found there was indirect coercion of religious minorities: "When the power, prestige and financial support of government is placed behind a particular religious belief, the indirect coercive pressure upon religious minorities to conform to the prevailing officially approved religion is plain."

Justice Black's reasoning included historical analysis:

It is a matter of history that this practice of establishing governmentally composed prayers for religious services was one of the reasons which caused many of our early colonists to leave England and seek religious freedom in America.

Justice Black's argument that religion is "too personal, too sacred, too holy to permit its 'unhallowed perversion' by a civil magistrate" includes a direct quote from James Madison's Memorial and Remonstrance. (Note: "Because the Bill implies either that the Civil Magistrate is a competent Judge of Religious Truth; or that he may employ Religion as an engine of Civil policy. The first is an arrogant pretension falsified by the contradictory opinions of Rulers in all ages, and throughout the world: the second an unhallowed perversion of the means of salvation.")

=== Douglas concurrence ===
In a concurring opinion, Justice Douglas argued that the Establishment Clause is also violated when the government grants financial aid to religious schools. He argued that the First Amendment requires the government to be neutral in religious matters:

The philosophy is that the atheist or agnostic—the non-believer—is entitled to go his own way. The philosophy is that if government interferes in matters spiritual, it will be a divisive force.

The concurrence was highly criticized. Douglas argued that all religious exercise in public settings was unconstitutional, foreshadowing the Court's decision in Abington v. Schempp the following year which took a neutrality view of Establishment: "In the relationship between man and religion, the State is firmly committed to a position of neutrality".

=== Stewart dissent ===
In his dissenting opinion, Justice Stewart contended that the Establishment Clause was originally written to abolish the idea of a state-sponsored church, and not to stop a non-mandatory "brief non-denominational prayer".

== Reactions ==
The negative reaction of Congress was overwhelming. Only John Lindsay and Emanuel Celler supported the decision. Frank J. Becker called it "the most tragic decision in the history of the United States" and introduced a proposed constitutional amendment to allow religious exercises in public schools. There was already a lot of anger towards the Warren Court, especially among white Protestants in the South and Midwest, for its school desegregation decision in Brown v. Board of Education. After the Engel decision, some members of Congress, like George Andrews of Alabama and James Eastland of Mississippi, made references to both desegregation and prayer in schools in their attacks on the Warren Court.

The Christian Century was critical of the southern politicians who opposed the ruling, accusing them of weaponizing the school prayer controversy "to whip the court for its desegregation of public schools". New York Times columnist Anthony Lewis wrote that politicians were trying to show "how equally wrong the Court had been to outlaw segregation".

The Senate Judiciary Committee headed by James Eastland held hearings on five measures to overturn the Engel decision. Bishop James Pike, a prominent religious moderate and lawyer, opposed the Court's broad interpretation of the Establishment Clause because it prohibited non-denominational prayer. He testified in support of a constitutional amendment that would limit the establishment of religion to "the recognition as an Established Church or any denomination, sect, or organized religious association".

While internal debate continued within the Jewish community about the role of religion in the public square, the American Jewish Congress called the case "a great milestone", and the decision was celebrated by most American Jewish groups.

Catholic clergy expressed strong disapproval of the decision. Cardinal Spellman said: "The decision strikes at the very heart of the Godly tradition in which America's children have for so long been raised." Led by John J. Rooney of New York, support among Catholics increased for federal funding for parochial schools.

The National Association of Evangelicals, the National Council of Churches and The Christian Century opposed proposals to overturn Engel by amendment. Supportive of the decision, The Christian Century noted that Engel had not decided the question of prayer in public schools because its holding was limited to a government-drafted prayer. Justice Clark's public statements distancing the majority opinion from Douglas' concurrence initially gave supporters of school prayer some hope that the Court would decline to issue a broad ruling in upcoming school prayer cases, but recitation of The Lord's Prayer in public school was ruled unconstitutional in Schempp the following year.

== Subsequent developments ==
Engel has been the basis for several subsequent decisions limiting government-directed prayer in school. In Wallace v. Jaffree (1985), the Supreme Court ruled Alabama's law permitting one minute for prayer or meditation was unconstitutional. In Lee v. Weisman (1992), the court prohibited clergy-led prayer at middle school graduation ceremonies. Lee v. Weisman, in turn, was a basis for Santa Fe ISD v. Doe (2000), in which the Court extended the ban to school-organized student-led prayer at high school football games in which a majority of students voted in favor of the prayer.

A year after the 1962 Engel ruling, the Court decided in Abington School District v. Schempp that recitation of the Lord's Prayer and Bible reading in school were unconstitutional under the Establishment Clause.

== See also ==
- List of United States Supreme Court cases, volume 370
- List of United States Supreme Court cases
- Separation of church and state in the United States
- West Virginia State Board of Education v. Barnette (1943)
- Everson v. Board of Education (1947)
- Abington School District v. Schempp (1963)
- Lemon v. Kurtzman (1971)
- Wallace v. Jaffree (1985)
- Kennedy v. Bremerton School District (2022)
- The Battle for School Prayer: How Engel v. Vitale Changed America
