= Edgerton Bible Case =

1890 Wisconsin Supreme Court case about religious instruction in public schools

State ex rel. Weiss v. District Board
- Seal of the Wisconsin Supreme Court
- Court: Wisconsin Supreme Court
- Full case name: State ex rel. Weiss et al. v. District Board of School District No. Eight
- Decided: March 18, 1890
- Citation: 76 Wis. 177

Case history
- Appealed from: Wisconsin Circuit Court for the 12th Judicial Circuit

Court membership
- Judges sitting: Orsamus Cole, Chief Justice; William P. Lyon, David Taylor, Harlow S. Orton, John B. Cassoday, Justices

Case opinions
- Readings from the Bible in public schools constitute sectarian instruction, in violation of Art. X, Sec. 3, and Art. I, Sec. 18, of the Constitution of Wisconsin
- Decision by: Lyon
- Concurrence: Cassoday, Orton

State ex rel. Weiss v. District Board, 76 Wis. 177 (1890), popularly known as the Edgerton Bible case, was an important court case involving religious instruction in public schools of the U.S. state of Wisconsin. The case was unanimously decided in favor of the appellants, and declared that the use of the King James Bible in Edgerton public schools was unconstitutional sectarian education.

== Background ==
In the early days of Edgerton, Wisconsin, it was common practice for public school teachers to read aloud to their students from the King James Bible. In 1886, Roman Catholic parents protested about that to the school board, citing their belief that the Douay version of the Bible was the only correct translation for their children.

After failing to convince the school board to end the practice, the parents—Frederick Weiss, W. H. Morrissey, Thomas Mooney, James McBride, J. C. Burns, and John Corbett—took their case to court. In November 1888, the circuit court judge, John R. Bennett, decided that the readings were not sectarian because both translations were of the same work. The parents then appealed the decision to the Wisconsin Supreme Court.

In State ex rel Weiss v. District Board 76 Wis. 177 (1890), 3, otherwise known as the Edgerton Bible Case, the justices overruled the circuit court's decision by concluding that it illegally united the functions of church and state.

In 1963, the United States Supreme Court banned government-sponsored compulsory prayer from public schools (see Abington School District v. Schempp), and Justice William Brennan Jr. cited the Edgerton Bible case in his decision.
