= Abington School District v. Schempp =

1963 U.S. Supreme Court case ending required prayer and Bible reading in public schools

- Supreme Court of the United States

Argued February 27–28, 1963 Decided June 17, 1963
- Full case name: School District of Abington Township, Pennsylvania, et al. v. Edward Schempp, et al.; Murray, et al. v. Curlett, et al., Constituting the Board of School Commissioners of Baltimore City
- Citations: 374 U.S. 203 (more) 83 S. Ct. 1560; 10 L. Ed. 2d 844; 1963 U.S. LEXIS 2611

Case history
- Prior: Schempp v. School District of Abington Township, 201 F. Supp. 815 (E.D. Pa. 1962); probable jurisdiction noted, 371 U.S. 807 (1962). Murray v. Curlett, 228 Md. 239, 179 A.2d 698 (1962); cert. granted, 371 U.S. 809 (1962).

Holding
- Legally sanctioned or officially mandated Bible reading and prayer in public schools is unconstitutional.

Court membership
- Chief Justice Earl Warren Associate Justices Hugo Black · William O. Douglas; Tom C. Clark · John M. Harlan II; William J. Brennan Jr. · Potter Stewart; Byron White · Arthur Goldberg

Case opinions
- Majority: Clark, joined by Warren, Black, Douglas, Harlan, Brennan, White, Goldberg
- Concurrence: Douglas
- Concurrence: Brennan
- Concurrence: Goldberg, joined by Harlan
- Dissent: Stewart

Laws applied
- U.S. Const. amends. I, XIV

Abington School District v. Schempp, 374 U.S. 203 (1963), was a landmark United States Supreme Court case in which the Court decided 8–1 in favor of the respondent, Edward Schempp, on behalf of his son Ellery Schempp, and declared that school-sponsored Bible reading and the recitation of the Lord's Prayer in public schools in the United States was unconstitutional.

== Background ==
Public schools in Pennsylvania had been required to start the school day by reading Bible verses since 1949. By the 1960s, four more states had passed similar laws requiring daily Bible reading. Twenty-five states had laws allowing "optional" Bible reading, with the remainder of the states having no laws supporting or rejecting Bible reading. In eleven of those states with laws supportive of Bible reading or state-sponsored prayer, state courts had declared the laws to be unconstitutional.

The Supreme Court had already applied the Establishment Clause to the states in Everson v. Board of Education (1947) by a process called incorporation.

Edward Schempp, a Unitarian Universalist, sued the Abington School District in the United States District Court for the Eastern District of Pennsylvania challenging the Pennsylvania law under the First and Fourteenth Amendments.

== Lower court history ==
During the first trial in federal district court, Schempp and his children testified as to specific religious doctrines "which were contrary to the religious beliefs which they held and to their familial teaching". The children testified that all of the doctrines to which they referred were read to them at various times as part of the exercises. In November 1956, Ellery Schempp decided that he would read the Quran during the daily Bible reading and informed school personnel that he would no longer stand for the recitation of the Lord's Prayer because he felt it was unconstitutional.

The district court ruled in Schempp's favor and struck down the Pennsylvania statute. The school district appealed. While that appeal was pending, the Pennsylvania legislature amended the statute to allow children to be excused from the exercises upon the written request of their parents. After the law changed, the Supreme Court vacated the first ruling and remanded the case back to the district court. Schempp believed that, even with the change to allow students to leave the classroom, his children's relationships with their teachers and classmates would be adversely affected. The district court again ruled for Schempp. The school district appealed to the Supreme Court again, and, on appeal, the case was consolidated with a similar Maryland case, Murray v. Curlett.

The Supreme Court granted certiorari to settle the persistent and vigorous protests resulting from its previous decision in Engel v. Vitale regarding religion in schools. Henry W. Sawyer argued the case for Schempp.

== Supreme Court of the United States ==
=== Majority opinion ===
The Supreme Court upheld the District Court's decision and found the Pennsylvania prayer statute unconstitutional. Writing for the Court's majority, Justice Tom C. Clark stated, "This Court has decisively settled that the First Amendment's mandate [in the Establishment Clause] has been made wholly applicable to the States by the Fourteenth Amendment ... in a series of cases since Cantwell. The Court explicitly upheld Engel v. Vitale, in which the Court ruled that a school's sanctioning of a prayer violated the Establishment Clause of the First Amendment to the United States Constitution, which states, "Congress shall make no law respecting an establishment of religion." The Abington court held that in organizing Bible reading, the school was conducting "a religious exercise," and "that cannot be done without violating the 'neutrality' required of the State by the balance of power between individual, church, and state that has been struck by the First Amendment" (374 U.S. 203 (1963)).

What was unexpected, however, were the ideas expressed in the second portion of Justice Clark's opinion written for the majority. The Court's recognition of religious ideals as valuable to the culture of the United States in that opinion are generally not cited much by either side of the church-state debate when discussing the case and the effect it had on the United States. His opening thoughts explicitly spelled out that view in past jurisprudence with cases similar to Abington v. Schempp.

Clark continued that the Court was of the feeling that regardless of the religious nature of the citizenry, the government at all levels, as required by the Constitution, must remain neutral in matters of religion "while protecting all, prefer[ring] none, and disparag[ing] none." The Court had rejected "the contention by many that the Establishment Clause forbade only governmental preference of one faith over another."

Citing Torcaso v. Watkins, Justice Clark added, "We repeat and again reaffirm that neither a State nor the Federal Government can constitutionally force a person 'to profess a belief or disbelief in any religion.' Neither can it constitutionally pass laws or impose requirements which aid all religions as against non-believers, and neither can it aid those religions based on a belief in the existence of God as against those religions founded on different beliefs." Such prohibited behavior was self-evident in the Pennsylvania law requiring Bible reading (and allowing recitation of the Lord's Prayer) in its public schools. The Court recognized the value of such ideal neutrality from lessons of history when government and religion were either fully fused or cooperative with one another and religious liberty was nonexistent or seriously curtailed.

=== Brennan's concurrence ===
Justice Brennan filed a concurrence more than seventy pages long which reviewed the history of the First Amendment and the relevant judicial and legislative history. Brennan argued that an originalist approach would be "misdirected", giving several reasons including the ambiguity of the historical record and the increasing religious diversity of American society, which raised well-founded concerns about the traditional role of prayer and Bible reading in public schools. Brennan emphasized that the First Amendment does not require "official hostility towards religion, but only neutrality".

Brennan later defended the "wall of separation" view of the Establishment Clause in other cases including a dissent in Marsh v. Chambers where he quoted his Schempp concurrence: "to be truly faithful to the Framers 'our use of the history of their time must limit itself to broad purposes, not specific practices'".

=== Stewart's dissent ===
Justice Potter Stewart filed the only dissent in the case. He was critical of both the lower court opinions and the decision the Supreme Court had reached regarding them. He wished to remand the case to lower courts for further proceedings.

Stewart had dissented in Engel v. Vitale and viewed the doctrine relied on in that case as implausible, given the long history of government religious practice in the United States, including the fact that the Supreme Court opens its sessions with the declaration, "God Save this Honorable Court" and that Congress opens its sessions with prayers, among many other examples. Stewart believed that such practice fit with the nation's long history of permitting free exercise of religious practices, even in the public sphere.

He declared the cases consolidated with Schempp as "so fundamentally deficient as to make impossible an informed or responsible determination of the constitutional issues presented," specifically of whether the Establishment Clause was violated. As to the intent and scope of the religion clauses of the First Amendment, he stated:

It is, I think, a fallacious oversimplification to regard the [religion clauses] as establishing a single constitutional standard of "separation of church and state", which can be applied in every case to delineate the required boundaries between government and religion... As a matter of history, the First Amendment was adopted solely as a limitation upon the newly created National Government. The events leading to its adoption strongly suggest that the Establishment Clause was primarily an attempt to ensure that Congress not only would be powerless to establish a national church, but would also be unable to interfere with existing state establishments. ... So matters stood until the adoption of the Fourteenth Amendment, or more accurately, until this Court's decision in Cantwell....

He stated his agreement with the doctrine of the Fourteenth Amendment's embrace and application of the Bill of Rights, but pointed out the irony of such an amendment "designed to leave the States free to go their own way should now have become a restriction upon their autonomy".

Other critics of the Court's holding in Abington v. Schempp often quote the following excerpt from Justice Stewart's opinion:

If religious exercises are held to be an impermissible activity in schools, religion is placed in an artificial and state-created disadvantage.... And a refusal to permit religious exercises thus is seen, not as the realization of state neutrality, but rather as the establishment of a religion of secularism, or at least, as governmental support of the beliefs of those who think that religious exercises should be conducted only in private.

== Subsequent developments ==
The public was divided in reaction to the Court's decision, which has sparked persistent and ongoing criticism from proponents of prayer in school. In 1964, Life magazine declared Madalyn Murray O'Hair, the mother of the plaintiff in one of the associated cases, to be "the most hated woman in America."

Newspapers were no exception. The Washington Evening Star, for example, criticized the decision, declaring that "God and religion have all but been driven from the public schools. What remains? Will the baccalaureate service and Christmas carols be the next to go? Don't bet against it." In contrast, The New York Times was more accepting of the Court's ruling. The paper printed significant portions of the opinions with no significant comments, either supportive or critical. Opponents characterized the decision as the one which "kicked God and prayer out of the schools".

The views of various religious entities on the decision split between mainline Protestants and Jews, who in general strongly supported the decision, and evangelical Protestants and conservative Catholics, who strongly opposed the decision. Speaking from the evangelical perspective, Billy Graham said, "[i]n my opinion... the Supreme Court... is wrong.... Eighty percent of the American people want Bible reading and prayer in schools. Why should a majority be so severely penalized...?" The mainline denominations, with the exception of the Roman Catholic Church, expressed less critical opinions of the verdict. Some considered it to support religious freedom because it limited governmental authority in the sphere of public schools.

The United States Congress reacted by drafting more than 150 resolutions to overturn the ruling by a constitutional amendment. Abington was used as precedent in similar cases such as Board of Education v. Allen and Lemon v. Kurtzman in the decades that followed. The three-part Lemon test had its basis in Abington. Under the test, the constitutionality of a church-state law is weighed by three criteria: whether a law has a non-secular purpose, advances or inhibits religion, or results in excessive government entanglement with religion.

The Supreme Court overturned the Lemon test in the 2022 decision of Kennedy v. Bremerton School District, in which the Court ruled that a coach who held a private prayer on the sports field, joined voluntarily by students and others, did not violate the Establishment Clause, and that the First Amendment protected the coach's right to such prayer. However, that decision did not explicitly overrule Schempp and restrictions against school prayer.

== See also ==
- Edgerton Bible Case
- List of United States Supreme Court cases, volume 374
- School prayer
- Cantwell v. Connecticut
- Everson v. Board of Education
- McCollum v. Board of Education
