= Freedom of religion by country =

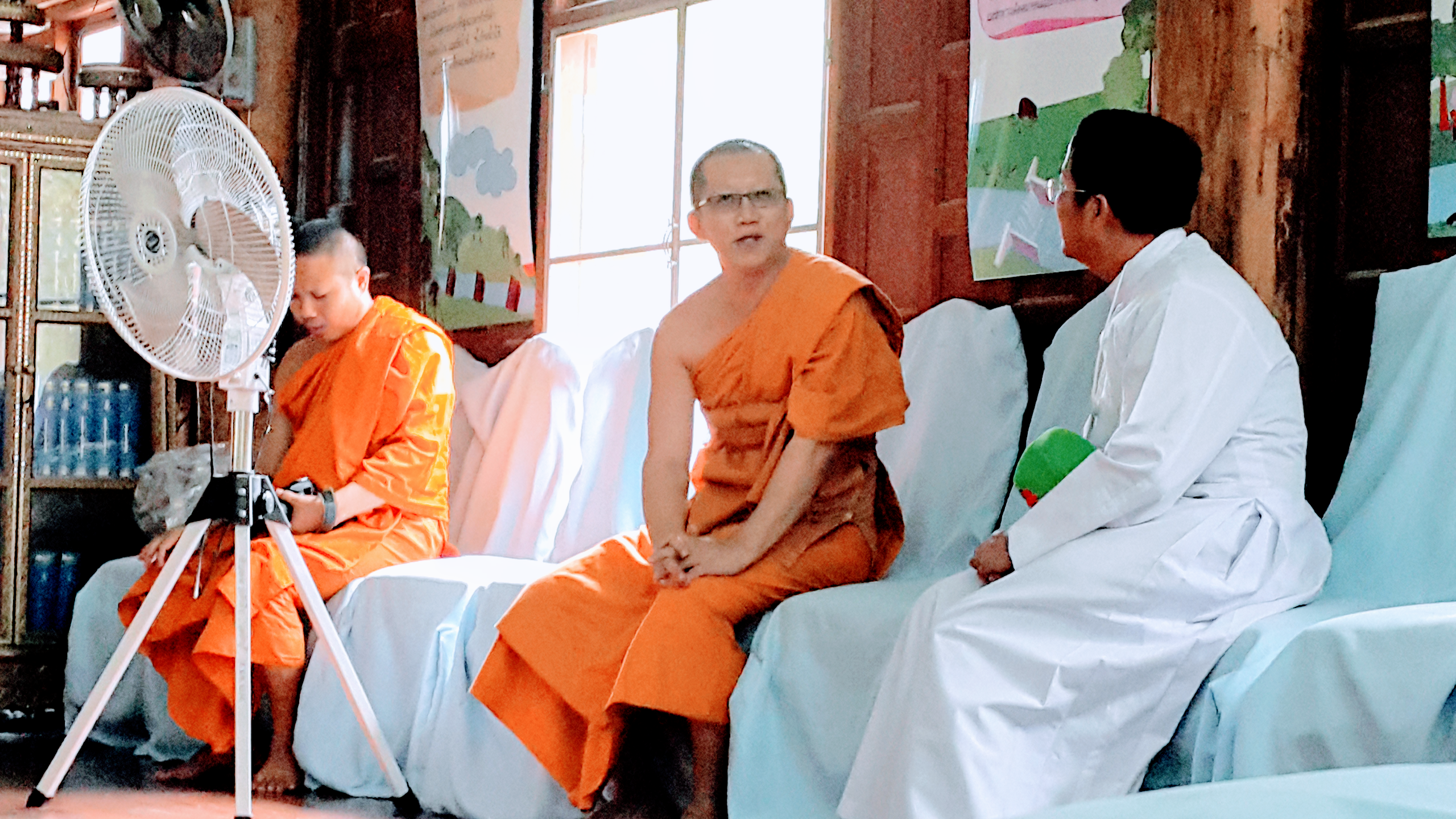
A Theravada Buddhist monk speaking with a Catholic priest, Thailand

The status of religious freedom around the world varies from country to country. States can differ based on whether or not they guarantee equal treatment under law for followers of different religions, whether they establish a state religion (and the legal implications that this has for both practitioners and non-practitioners), the extent to which religious organizations operating within the country are policed, and the extent to which religious law is used as a basis for the country's legal code.

There are further discrepancies between some countries' self-proclaimed stances of religious freedom in law and the actual practice of authority bodies within those countries: a country's establishment of religious equality in their constitution or laws does not necessarily translate into freedom of practice for residents of the country. Additionally, similar practices (such as having citizens identify their religious preference to the government or on identification cards) can have different consequences depending on other sociopolitical circumstances specific to the countries in question.

Over 120 national constitutions mention equality regardless of religion.

== Africa ==
Most countries in Africa legally establish that freedom of religion is a right conferred to all individuals. The extent to which this is enforced in practice varies greatly from country to country. Several countries have anti-discrimination laws which prohibit religious discrimination. Several countries, particularly in West Africa and Southern Africa, have a high degree of religious tolerance, both as enforced by the government, and as reflected by societal attitudes. Others, however, have significant levels of religious discrimination, either practiced by government apparatuses or by the general public. Groups facing significant levels of legal discrimination in Africa include Muslims (in majority Christian countries), Christians (in majority Muslim countries), Baháʼí Faith practitioners, Ahmadiyya Muslims (in Muslim countries), and Rastafarians. Additionally, some countries have significant levels of societal animosity against atheists. Some countries ban witchcraft. Several countries establish Islam as a state religion, and some countries with significant Muslim populations also have significant government oversight of Islamic practice in the country, up to and including the establishment of religious Islamic courts, which are most commonly used for family law. These courts are usually present in addition to secular courts, and typically have a subordinate role, although this is not always the case.

Several countries require that religious organizations register with the government, and some ban the establishment of religious political parties. Several countries provide funding for religious institutions and/or pilgrimages.

Religiously motivated violence is present in some countries, particularly ones that have a high level of political instability or active insurgencies.

== Asia ==
Most countries in Asia officially establish the freedom of religion by law, but the extent to which this is enforced varies. Some countries have anti-discrimination laws, and others have anti-blasphemy laws. Legal religious discrimination is present in many countries in Asia. Some countries also have significantly restricted the activities of Islamic groups that they have identified as fundamentalist. Several countries ban proselytization, either in general or for specific religious groups. Tajikistan has significant restrictions against the practice of religion in general, and other countries like China discourage it on a wide basis. Several countries in Asia establish a state religion, with Islam (usually Sunni Islam) being the most common, followed by Buddhism. Lebanon and Iran, as well as the Democratic Federation of Northern Syria have established confessionalist political systems which guarantee set levels of representation in government to specific religious groups in the country. Some majority Muslim countries have Islamic religious courts, with varying degrees of jurisdiction. The governments of some Muslim countries have played an active role in overseeing and directing forms of Muslim religious practice within their country.

Societal levels of religious tolerance vary greatly across Asia. Groups negatively affected include Muslims, Christians, Buddhists and Hindus.

Religious violence is present in several countries, with varying degrees of support or intervention from local governments. Groups including Muslims, Christians, Buddhists and Hindus face religiously motivated violence.

== Europe ==
Virtually every country in Europe legally establishes the freedom of religion for people living in the country, and most also have anti-discrimination laws that specifically highlight religious freedom. However, enforcement of these laws is not always consistent, and several countries routinely fail to implement these laws at a local level. A few countries in Europe continue to have state religions. Most countries in the former Eastern bloc have government programs for the restitution of religious property confiscated by previous socialist governments. Many countries in Europe also provide government funding or other privileges for registered religious groups. Several countries have animal slaughter laws that effectively ban butchers from making kosher and halal meat, and a smaller proportion ban non-medical circumcision, generally on the grounds of animal rights and human rights respectively. In most cases, religious individuals that need to observe these practices are able to import meat and go to other countries to have circumcisions performed without interference from their government.

Religious tolerance in general society varies across Europe. While some countries have a high degree of religious tolerance, others have significant levels of Anti-Muslim and anti-Jewish sentiments in the general populace, as well as discrimination against Jehovah's Witnesses, at times resulting in religiously-motivated physical violence or vandalism. In a few countries, particularly in former Yugoslav states, but also Ukraine, there are hostilities between Christian denominations connected to disputes between Orthodox churches over religious jurisdictions and the control of holy sites.

== North America ==
Every country in North America includes provisions for the freedom of religion or freedom of conscience in its constitution. Several countries also have formally outlawed discrimination on religious grounds, and according to US State Department reports many countries in the region have no outstanding issues regarding breaches of religious freedom due to government intervention or societal pressure. Seven countries have blasphemy laws which have been part of their legal codes since the British colonial era, but which are not currently enforced. Rastafarians face discrimination and obstacles to religious practice in many countries in the region, often due in part to countries outlawing cannabis, which is used in Rastafarian religious rituals. Roman Catholicism is the state religion of a few countries in North America, and a couple more provide preferential treatment to the Catholic Church despite not officially establishing it as a state religion.

== Oceania ==
All of the countries in Oceania officially guarantee the right to freedom of religion in a constitution or bill of rights, although over half qualify this freedom as being subordinate to other concerns such as public safety or "morality". Additionally, a few countries have communal local leadership structures which are sometimes hostile to foreign religions, despite official legal requirements for tolerance. Only two countries in Oceania, Samoa and Tuvalu, have state religions (Christianity for Samoa and a specific Christian church for Tuvalu), and a few additional countries specifically reference Christianity as a core or founding principle in their constitutions. According to US government reports, about one quarter of the countries in Oceania have had no significant breaches of the freedom of religion; a similar proportion have recorded incidents of violence against religious minorities in the 21st century, against Hindus (Fiji), Jews (Australia) and Muslims (New Zealand and Papua New Guinea, with other countries having significant quantities of anti-Muslim political discourse).

== South America ==
Every country in South America includes a provision for the freedom of religion in its constitution. A few countries have explicitly outlawed discrimination along religious lines. While no country in South America has an official state religion, some confer preferential treatment to the Catholic Church. Antisemitic vandalism has been reported in three countries in South America.

== See also ==
- Apostasy in Islam by country
- Freedom of religion
- Separation of church and state
- Toleration
- State religion
- Category:Freedom of religion by country
