= Everson v. Board of Education =

- Supreme Court of the United States

Argued November 20, 1946 Decided February 10, 1947
- Full case name: Arch R. Everson v Board of Education of the Township of Ewing, et al.
- Citations: 330 U.S. 1 (more) 67 S. Ct. 504; 91 L. Ed. 711; 1947 U.S. LEXIS 2959; 168 A.L.R. 1392

Case history
- Prior: Everson sued as a school district taxpayer, judgment for plaintiff, 132 N.J.L. 98, 39 A.2d 75; New Jersey Court of Errors and Appeals reversed, 133 N.J.L. 350, 44 A.2d 333, cert. granted.
- Subsequent: Rehearing denied, 330 U.S. 855 (1947).

Holding
- (1) The Establishment Clause of the First Amendment is incorporated against the states through the Due Process Clause of the Fourteenth Amendment. (2) New Jersey law providing public payment of the costs of transportation to and from parochial Catholic schools is not in violation of the Establishment Clause.

Court membership
- Chief Justice Fred M. Vinson Associate Justices Hugo Black · Stanley F. Reed; Felix Frankfurter · William O. Douglas; Frank Murphy · Robert H. Jackson; Wiley B. Rutledge · Harold H. Burton

Case opinions
- Majority: Black, joined by Vinson, Reed, Douglas, Murphy
- Dissent: Jackson, joined by Frankfurter
- Dissent: Rutledge, joined by Frankfurter, Jackson, Burton

Laws applied
- U.S. Const. amends. I, XIV

Everson v. Board of Education, 330 U.S. 1 (1947), is a landmark decision of the United States Supreme Court that applied the Establishment Clause of the First Amendment to state law. Before this decision, the clause, which states, "Congress shall make no law respecting an establishment of religion", restricted only the federal government, while many states continued to grant certain religious denominations legislative or effective privileges.

It was the first Supreme Court case incorporating the Establishment Clause of the First Amendment as binding upon the states through the Due Process Clause of the Fourteenth Amendment.

A New Jersey taxpayer brought the case against a tax-funded school district that provided reimbursement to parents of both public and private school students who took public transportation to school. The taxpayer contended that reimbursement for children attending private religious schools violated the constitutional prohibition against state support of religion, and the use of taxpayer funds to do so violated the Due Process Clause. The Justices were split over the question whether the New Jersey policy constituted support of religion, with the majority concluding that the reimbursements were "separate and so indisputably marked off from the religious function" that they did not violate the constitution. Both affirming and dissenting Justices, however, agreed that the Constitution required a sharp separation between government and religion, and their strongly-worded opinions paved the way to a series of later court decisions that collectively brought about profound changes in legislation, public education, and other policies involving matters of religion. Both Justice Hugo Black's majority opinion and Justice Wiley Rutledge's dissenting opinion defined the First Amendment religious clause in terms of a "wall of separation between church and state."

== Background ==
After repealing a former ban, a 1941 New Jersey law authorized payment by local school boards of the costs of transportation to and from schools, including private schools, most of which were parochial Catholic schools.

Arch R. Everson, a taxpayer in Ewing Township, filed a lawsuit on state constitutional grounds. The Establishment Clause was not yet incorporated when the lawsuit was filed.

The New Jersey Supreme Court held that the provision violated the state constitution's purpose restriction on the legislative power to authorize spending for private and parochial schools. (Note: The NJ Supreme Court held the spending authorization for transportation reimbursement to parents violated Article 4 §7 ¶6 of the state constitution, which reads: "The fund for the support of free schools[...]shall be annually appropriated to the support of public free schools, for the equal benefit of all the people of the state; and it shall not be competent for the legislature to borrow, appropriate or use the said fund, or any part thereof, for any other purpose, under any pretense whatever."132 N.J.L. 98. 39 A.2d 75) After this decision was reversed by the New Jersey Court of Errors and Appeals, then the state's highest court, Everson appealed to the US Supreme Court which decided the case on federal grounds only. (Note: Since there has been no attack on the statute on the ground that a part of its language excludes children attending private schools operated for profit from enjoying state payment for their transportation[...]we put to one side the question as to the validity of the statute against the claim that it does not authorize payment for the transportation generally of school children in New Jersey. The only contention here is that the State statute and the resolution, insofar as they authorized reimbursement to parents of children attending parochial schools, violate the Federal Constitution 330 US 1, 4, 5)

== Supreme Court ==
The Supreme Court handed down its 5–4 decision upholding the state law on February 10, 1947. The decision was the first to hold that the Establishment Clause was applicable against the states. It is also remembered as the first Supreme Court case to attempt an explanation of the Establishment Clause. They held that the New Jersey law providing reimbursement to transportation to all students was not a violation of the establishment clause.

=== Majority opinion ===
In a majority opinion by Justice Hugo Black, the Supreme Court ruled that the state bill was constitutionally permissible because the law had a "public purpose" to provide safe transportation to parochial school students.

The Court's interpretation of the Establishment Clause was broad and would guide the Court's jurisprudence for decades to come. Arthur E. Sutherland Jr. called it "the most influential single announcement of the American law of church and state". Black's language was sweeping:

The 'establishment of religion' clause of the First Amendment means at least this: Neither a state nor the Federal Government can set up a church. Neither can pass laws which aid one religion, aid all religions or prefer one religion over another. Neither can force nor influence a person to go to or to remain away from church against his will or force him to profess a belief or disbelief in any religion. No person can be punished for entertaining or professing religious beliefs or disbeliefs, for church attendance or non-attendance. No tax in any amount, large or small, can be levied to support any religious activities or institutions, whatever they may be called, or whatever form they may adopt to teach or practice religion. Neither a state nor the Federal Government can, openly or secretly, participate in the affairs of any religious organizations or groups and vice versa. In the words of Jefferson, the clause against establishment of religion by law was intended to erect "'a wall of separation between Church and State."

This highly influential dictum was supported only by a historical analysis based on James Madison's Memorial and Remonstrance Against Religious Assessments and Thomas Jefferson's Virginia Statute for Religious Freedom.

=== Dissents ===
Justice Jackson wrote a dissenting opinion which Justice Frankfurter joined. Justice Rutledge wrote another dissenting opinion which Justices Frankfurter, Jackson, and Burton joined. The four dissenters agreed with Justice Black's definition of the Establishment Clause but protested that the principles that he laid down would logically lead to the invalidation of the challenged law:

The great condition of religious liberty is that it be maintained free from sustenance, as also from other interferences, by the state. For when it comes to rest upon that secular foundation it vanishes with the resting.

== Analysis ==
=== Debate about Justice Black' historical analysis ===
The historical basis of Justice Black's analysis in Everson v. Board of Education has been criticized for overlooking the broader history of religious establishments. At the time the First Amendment was adopted, establishments of religion were familiar institutions. Critics argue that the Court overlooked this international historical practice and focused too heavily on Virginia's rejection of Patrick Henry's assessment bill in 1785 and the subsequent adoption of Jefferson's Virginia Statute for Religious Freedom.

Michael McConnell argues that the Court's account presents opposition to religious establishment as far more straightforward than the historical record supports. He points out that many Americans supported government recognition of religion and that disestablishment developed through contested debates over different models of church–state relations. He regards the Virginia Assessment Controversy as important but only one episode in the broader development of religious freedom.

=== "Public purpose": Indirect benefits ===
The Establishment Clause guarantee protects taxpayers from being forced "to support any religious activities" with public money. Everson upheld the constitutionality of reimbursing the students transportation costs because the program had a public welfare purpose. The Court said that public funds could not be used "to teach or practice religion." Citing Cochran v. Louisiana State Board of Education, Justice Black wrote that it was "too late to argue that legislation intended to facilitate the opportunity of children to get a secular education serves no public purpose".

An "indirect benefit" to parochial schools did not make a statute with a legitimate secular purpose unconstitutional. The divided opinion laid the groundwork for the Lemon test which would add the primary effect and excessive entanglement criteria.

== Legacy ==
Everson's holding incorporating the Establishment Clause was controversial and more cases followed. A few months later the Court reaffirmed this holding in the first released time case McCollum v. Board of Education. The court continued to hear cases about religion in public schools in cases like Abington v. Schempp which banned daily bible readings in public school. The American public was divided and some viewed the cases as heralding the secularization of public life in the United States.

Having invoked Jefferson's metaphor of the wall of separation in the Everson decision, lawmakers and courts have struggled how to balance governments' dual duty to satisfy the Establishment and Free Exercise Clauses of the First Amendment. The majority and dissenting Justices in Everson split over the question, with Rutledge in the minority by insisting that the Constitution forbids "every form of public aid or support for religion."

Writing for the majority in McCollum, Justice Black defended the Everson holding and the "wall of separation" dictum. The Court's historical argument was reaffirmed in subsequent cases including Abington School District v. Schempp, Engel v. Vitale and McGowan v. Maryland.

== See also ==
- List of United States Supreme Court cases, volume 330
- Zellers v. Huff

== Sources ==
- Dunne, Gerald T. (1977). Hugo Black and the judicial revolution. Simon & Schuster. ISBN 9780671223410.
- Garry, Patrick M. (2004). The Myth of Separation: America's Historical Experience with Church and State (Vol. 33, No. 2 ed.). Hofstra Law Review. SSRN 1139183.
- Finkelman, Paul (2013). Encyclopedia of American Civil Liberties. Routledge. ISBN 9781135947040.
- Ivers, Gregg (1995). To build a wall : American Jews and the separation of church and state. University Press of Virginia. ISBN 978-0-8139-1554-8.
- Kauper, Paul (1968). "The Warren Court: Religious Liberty and Church-State Relations". Michigan Law Review. 67 (2): 269–288. doi:10.2307/1287419. JSTOR 1287419.
- Hamburger, Philip (2002). Separation of church and state. Harvard University Press. ISBN 978-0-674-00734-5.
- Maltz, Earl M. (2000). The chief justiceship of Warren Burger, 1969-1986. University of South Carolina Press. ISBN 9781-57003-335-3.
- McConnell, Michael W. (2003). "Establishment and Disestablishment at the Founding, Part I: Establishment of Religion". William & Mary Law Review. 44 (5): 2105–2206.
- McWhirter, Darien A. (1994). The Separation of Church and State. Oryx. ISBN 9780897748520.
- Schultz, Jeffrey D.; John G. West Jr.; Iain Maclean, eds. (1999). "Disestablishment"; "Hugo L. Black". Encyclopedia of Religion in American Politics. Phoenix, Arizona: Oryx. p. 390.
