= Lou Neff Point =

Promontory in Austin, Texas, U.S.

Coordinates: 30°16′2″N 97°45′42″W

- Promontory
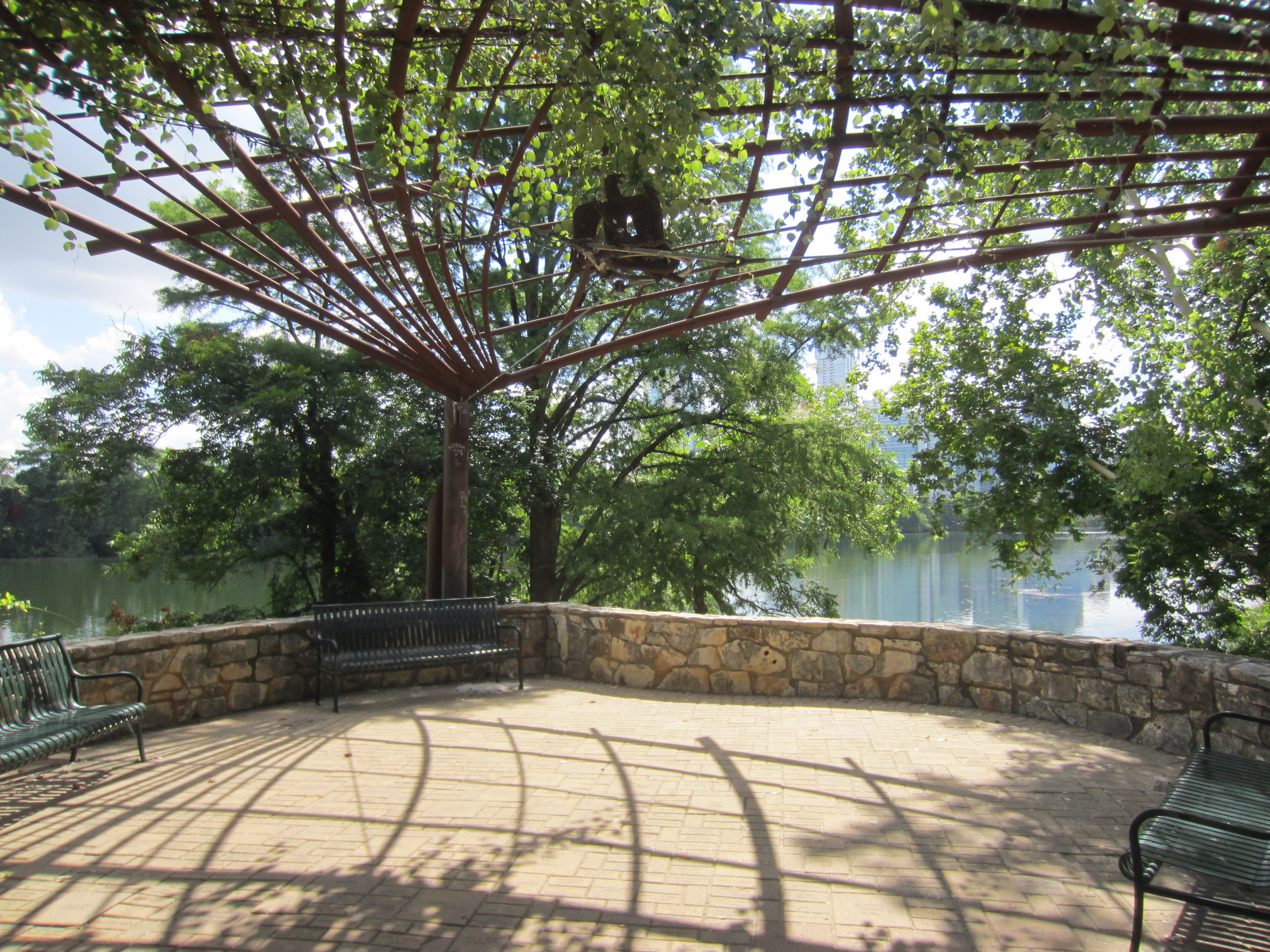
- The gazebo in 2021
- Interactive map of Lou Neff Point
- Location: Zilker Park, Austin, Texas, United States
- Water bodies: Barton Creek; Lady Bird Lake
- Etymology: Lou Neff, member of the Town Lake Beautification Committee
- Operator: The Trail Conservancy
- Elevation: 430 feet (130 m)

Lou Neff Point is a promontory with a gazebo in Austin, Texas, United States.

== Description and history ==
The point offers views of downtown Austin from where Barton Creek enters Lady Bird Lake. In 1975, the Texas Society of Landscape Architects selected Lou Neff Point as the "best example of Texas Public Architecture".

The Austin Group-designed gazebo was installed in 1993.

Lou Neff Point was widened and restored by The Trail Foundation with funding provided by the Michael and Susan Dell Foundation, the Stillwater Foundation, friends of Nancy Kohler, and members of The Trail Foundation. The work was completed during April–June 2006.

== Named in honor of Lou Neff ==
The point is named after Lou Neff, a member of the Town Lake Beautification Committee who worked with Lady Bird Johnson. Neff was a former president of the Austin Junior League and a member of the Natural Science Center Guild. In 1971 the Austin American Statesman included her among their Outstanding Women in Austin. Three years later Neff died at the age of 44.
