= School prayer =

State-sponsored or mandatory prayer by public school students

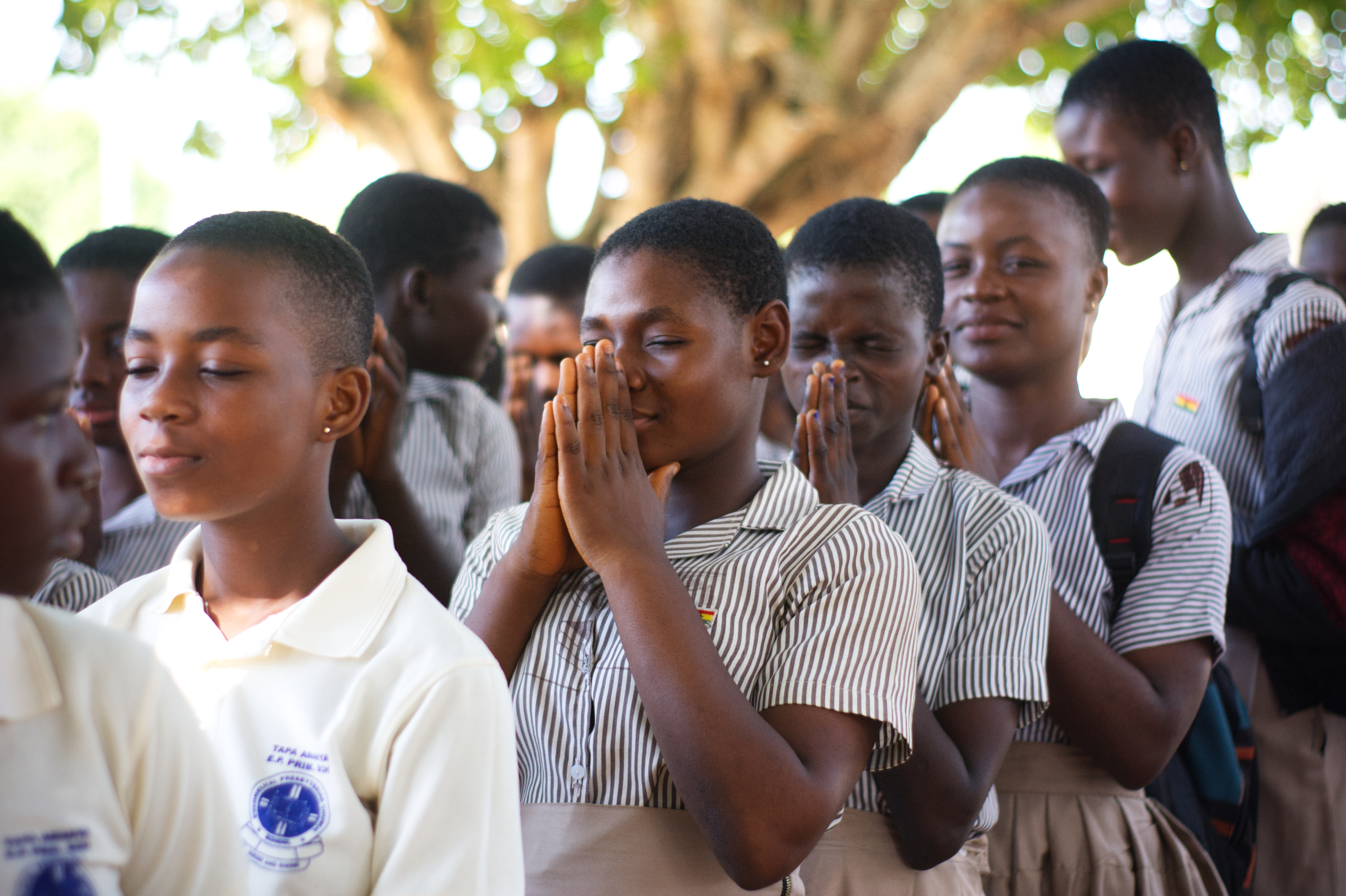
Students praying

School prayer, also known as school-sponsored prayer in the context of religious liberty, is state-sanctioned or mandatory prayer by students in public schools. Depending on the country and the type of school, state-sponsored prayer may be required, permitted, or prohibited. The United Kingdom requires daily worship by law, but does not enforce it. Countries which prohibit or limit school prayer often differ in their reasons for doing so. In the United States, school prayer cannot be required of students in accordance with the Establishment Clause of the First Amendment to the United States Constitution. This is generally rigorously applied in public schools; the Establishment Clause does not prevent prayer in private schools that have no public funding. In Canada, school-sponsored prayer is disallowed under the concept of freedom of conscience as outlined in the Canadian Charter on Rights & Fundamental Freedoms. School-sponsored prayer is disallowed in France as a byproduct of its status as a secular nation.

== Countries that permit school-sponsored prayer ==
=== Indonesia ===
School prayers are a longstanding tradition in Indonesian schools. There is no specific law mandating school prayers in Indonesia. Before a religious education lesson, students pray according to their respective religions. On 10 December 2014, Minister of Education and Culture Anies Baswedan proposed to regulate the contents of school prayers before and after school. He denied rumours that he wanted to ban school prayers.

=== United Kingdom ===
In England and Wales, the School Standards and Framework Act 1998 states that all pupils in state schools must take part in a daily act of collective worship, unless their parents request that they be excused from attending. This collective worship must be "wholly or mainly of a broadly Christian character". A legislative document provided by His Majesty's Government and drafted by the Office of the Parliamentary Counsel provides that if a parent of a child within the school decides not to receive further religious education, they will be exempt from it hencewith. Ofsted's 2002-03 annual report, however, stated that 80% of secondary schools were not providing daily worship for all pupils.

==== School Standards and Framework Act 1998; c. 31; Part II; Chapter VI; Religious Worship; Section 70 ====
===== 70 Requirements relating to collective worship =====
(1) Subject to section 71, each pupil in attendance at a community, foundation or voluntary school shall on each school day take part in an act of

collective worship.

(2) Subject to section 71, in relation to any community, foundation or voluntary school—

(a) the [^{F1}local authority] and the governing body shall exercise their functions with a view to securing, and

(b) the head teacher shall secure,

that subsection (1) is complied with.

(3) Schedule 20 makes further provision with respect to the collective worship required by this section,

including provision relating to—

(a) the arrangements which are to be made in connection with such worship, and

(b) the nature of such worship.

The Department of Education in England states that all schools must maintain religious prayer in schools in order to reflect the beliefs and traditions of the country, which were conventionally of the Christian faith (as of mid-2010's there has been a demographic increase in the number of schools of Islamic or Muslim nature). However, a recent BBC radio study shows that 64% of children (out of 500) do not attend or participate in daily acts of worship or prayer. Regarding public opinion in the United Kingdom for mandated school prayer, the numbers are relatively similar. In fact, a 2011 survey conducted by BBC found that 60% of parents (out of the 1,743 questioned) believed that the legislation that requires group worship should not be enforced at all. Although parents do retain the right to officially keep their children from taking part in daily worship, there are critics who claim the legislation should be changed or discarded completely in order to allow for religious freedom and cater to the wants of parents, children, and staff.

== Countries that prohibit school-sponsored prayer ==
=== United States ===
School prayer in the United States, if organized by the school, is largely banned from public elementary, middle, and high schools by a series of Supreme Court decisions since 1962. Students may pray privately, and join religious clubs in after-school hours. Public schools, such as local school districts, are banned from conducting religious observances such as prayer. Private and parochial schools are not covered by these rulings, nor are colleges and universities. Elementary and secondary schools are covered because students are required to attend, and are considered more at risk from official pressure than are older students and adults. The Constitutional basis for this prohibition is the First Amendment to the United States Constitution, which requires that:

Congress shall make no law respecting an establishment of religion, or prohibiting the free exercise thereof ...

The first part of the amendment ("Congress shall make no law respecting an establishment of religion") is known as the Establishment Clause of the First Amendment, while the second part ("or prohibiting the free exercise thereof") is known as the Free Exercise Clause.

Although each of these clauses originally applied only to the federal government, the Fourteenth Amendment extended the scope of the entire First Amendment to all levels of government, including the state and local levels, thus compelling states and their public schools to adopt an equally detached approach to religion in schools.

Since 1962, the Supreme Court has repeatedly ruled that school-mandated prayers in public schools are unconstitutional. United States law does permit religious education of public school students, along with voluntary prayer, during school hours under the principle of released time as "long as the teachers are not state-approved, public money is not involved, and there is no state coercion."

=== Canada ===
==== British Columbia ====
Prior to 1944, in British Columbia, the Public Schools Act (1872) permitted the use of the Lord’s Prayer in opening or closing school. In 1944, the government of British Columbia amended the Public Schools Act to provide for compulsory Bible reading at the opening of the school day, to be followed by a compulsory recitation of the Lord’s Prayer. This amendment appeared as section 167 of the Public Schools Act, and read as follows:

167. All public schools shall be opened by the reading, without explanation or comment, of a passage of Scripture to be selected from readings prescribed or approved by the Council of Public Instruction. The reading of the passage of Scripture shall be followed by the recitation of the Lord’s Prayer, but otherwise the schools shall be conducted on strictly secular and non-sectarian principles. The highest morality shall be inculcated, but no religious dogma or creed shall be taught. 1948, c.42, s.167

The compulsory nature of the Bible reading and prayer recitation was slightly modified by regulations drawn up by the Council of Public Instruction. These regulations provided that either a teacher or student who has conscientious ground for objecting to the religious observances may be excused from them. The procedure to be followed in such cases was outlined in the regulations, which follow in full:

Division (15)—Scripture Readings (Section 167)

15.01 Where a teacher sends a written notice to the Board of School Trustees or official trustee by whom he is employed that he has conscientious objections to conducting the. ceremony of reading prescribed selections from the Bible and reciting the Lord’s Prayer (as provided by Section 167 of the Public Schools Act), he shall be excused from such duty, and in such case it shall be the duty of the Board of School Trustees or official trustee concerned to arrange with the Principal to have the ceremony conducted by some other teacher in the school, or by a school trustee, or, where neither of these alternatives is possible, by one of the senior pupils of the school or by some other suitable person other than an ordained member of a religious sect or denomination.

15.02 Where the parent or guardian of any pupil attending a public school sends a written notice to the teacher of the pupil stating that for conscientious reasons he does not wish the pupil to attend the ceremony of reading prescribed selections from the Bible and reciting the Lord’s Prayer at the opening of school, the teacher shall excuse the pupil from attendance at such ceremony and at his discretion may assign the pupil some other useful employment at school during that period, but the pupil so excused shall not be deprived of any other benefits of the school by reason of his non-attendance at the ceremony.

In 1982, the Canadian Charter of Rights and Freedoms received royal assent. Section 2 of the charter guaranteeing freedom of conscience and freedom of religion trumped Section 167 of the Public Schools Act (1872). Sixteen years later in 1996, based on precedent that would be established in Ontario (1989), required recitation of the Lord’s Prayer as outlined in the Public Schools Act would be held to violate the Charter of Rights and Freedoms.

==== Ontario ====
The challenges to Christian opening and closing exercises occurred mainly in Ontario with the crucial case being fought in The Ontario Court of Appeal in 1988.

Zylberberg v. Sudbury Board of Education (Director) The Ontario Court of Appeal ruled that the use of the Lord’s Prayer in opening exercises in public schools offended the Charter s. 2(a). 1988. (1988), 65 O.R. (2d) 641, 29 O.A.C. 23 (C.A.). Education regulations did not require the use of the Lord's Prayer and there was an exemption provision. The Ontario Court of Appeal ruled that the regulation infringed religious freedom because schools could use only the Lord's Prayer rather than a more inclusive approach. It was argued that the exemption provision effectively stigmatized children and coerced them into a religious observance which was offensive to them.

The Ontario Court of Appeal was persuaded by the argument that the need to seek exemption from Christian exercises is itself a form of religious discrimination. The judges described as insensitive the position of the respondents that it was beneficial for the minority children to confront the fact of their difference from the majority.

==== Russow v. British Columbia ====
In 1989, Joan Russow challenged, in the British Columbia Supreme Court, the Public Schools Act's requirement that in British Columbia all public schools were to be opened with the Lord’s Prayer and a Bible reading. The argument was similar to the Zylberberg case and the result was the same: The offending words in the Public Schools Act were removed as being inconsistent with freedom of conscience and religion guarantees in the Canadian Charter of Rights and Freedoms. Further following the Zylberberg case to strike down use of the Lord’s Prayer in schools, the British Columbia Supreme Court incorporated the Ontario Court of Appeal's decision in Zylberberg in its entirety.

From 1871 to 1989, observance of school prayer had declined.

With the unfavorable court decision, the requirement for Christian morning exercises was replaced with the following clauses found in the School Act (1996) in British Columbia.

Conduct:

76 (1) All schools and Provincial schools must be conducted on strictly secular and nonsectarian principles.

(2) The highest morality must be inculcated, but no religious dogma or creed is to be – taught in a school or Provincial school.

=== France ===
As a secular state (laïcité), France has no school prayers in secular state-run institutions. Instead, public servants are advised to keep their religious faith private, and may be censured if they display it too openly. The French law on secularity and conspicuous religious symbols in schools goes beyond restricting prayer in schools and bans the wearing of conspicuous religious symbols by pupils in public primary and secondary schools. However, teachers in private religious schools have been paid by the government.

=== India ===
Being a secular state, religious instructions are prohibited by Article 26 of the Indian Constitution in schools administered by the state and hence school sponsored prayers are not allowed. However, Indian law also allows Islamic and other minority religious private schools to receive partial financial support from the states' and the central government of India to offer religious indoctrination if the school agrees that the student has an option to opt out from religious indoctrination if he or she so asks, and that the school will not discriminate any student based on religion, race, or other protected status grounds.

== Ongoing debate ==
=== Arguments for and against school prayer ===
The issue of school prayer remains contentious even where courts as diverse as those in the United States, Russia, and Poland attempt to strike a balance between religious and secular activity in state-sponsored arenas. Some arguments have held that religion in schools is both an effective sociomoral tool as well as a valuable means to psychological stability. On the opposing side, others have argued that prayer has no place in a classroom where impressionable students are continually subject to influence by the majority. The latter view holds that, to the extent that a public school itself promotes the majority religion, the state is guilty of coercive interference in the lives of the individual.

== See also ==
- Freedom of religion
- Moment of silence
- Madalyn Murray O'Hair
- Separation of church and state
- Status of religious freedom by country
