= Accommodationism in the United States =

Accommodationism in the United States is a judicial interpretation of accommodationism which espouses that "the government may support or endorse religious establishments as long as it treats all religions equally and does not show preferential treatment." Accommodationists espouse the view that "religious individuals, and/or religious entities may be accommodated by government in regard to such things as free exercise rights, access to government programs and facilities, and religious expression."

Accommodationists hold that religion "has beneficial consequences for human behavior; that is, religion provides a transcendent basis for morality and provides limits for the scope of political conflict". They teach that religion "combines an objective, nonarbitrary basis for public morality with respect for the dignity and autonomy of each individual" and thus "balances the need for public order with a respect for individual liberty".

Since the time that the first president of the United States, George Washington, wrote a notable letter to the Religious Society of Friends (Quakers) affirming their right to conscientious objection with regard to war, "the accommodationist position has been dominant in U.S. law and public culture". It is also advocated by many social conservatives of many political orientations, such as Christian democratic political parties.

Accommodationism stands in tension with the judicial interpretation of separation of church and state, and the constitutionality of various government practices with respect to religion is a topic of active debate. Both principles arise from interpretations of the Establishment Clause and the Free Exercise Clause in the First Amendment to the Constitution of the United States; the U.S. has freedom of religion and bars established religion, and accommodationism is viewed by its proponents as fitting within that boundary.

== History ==
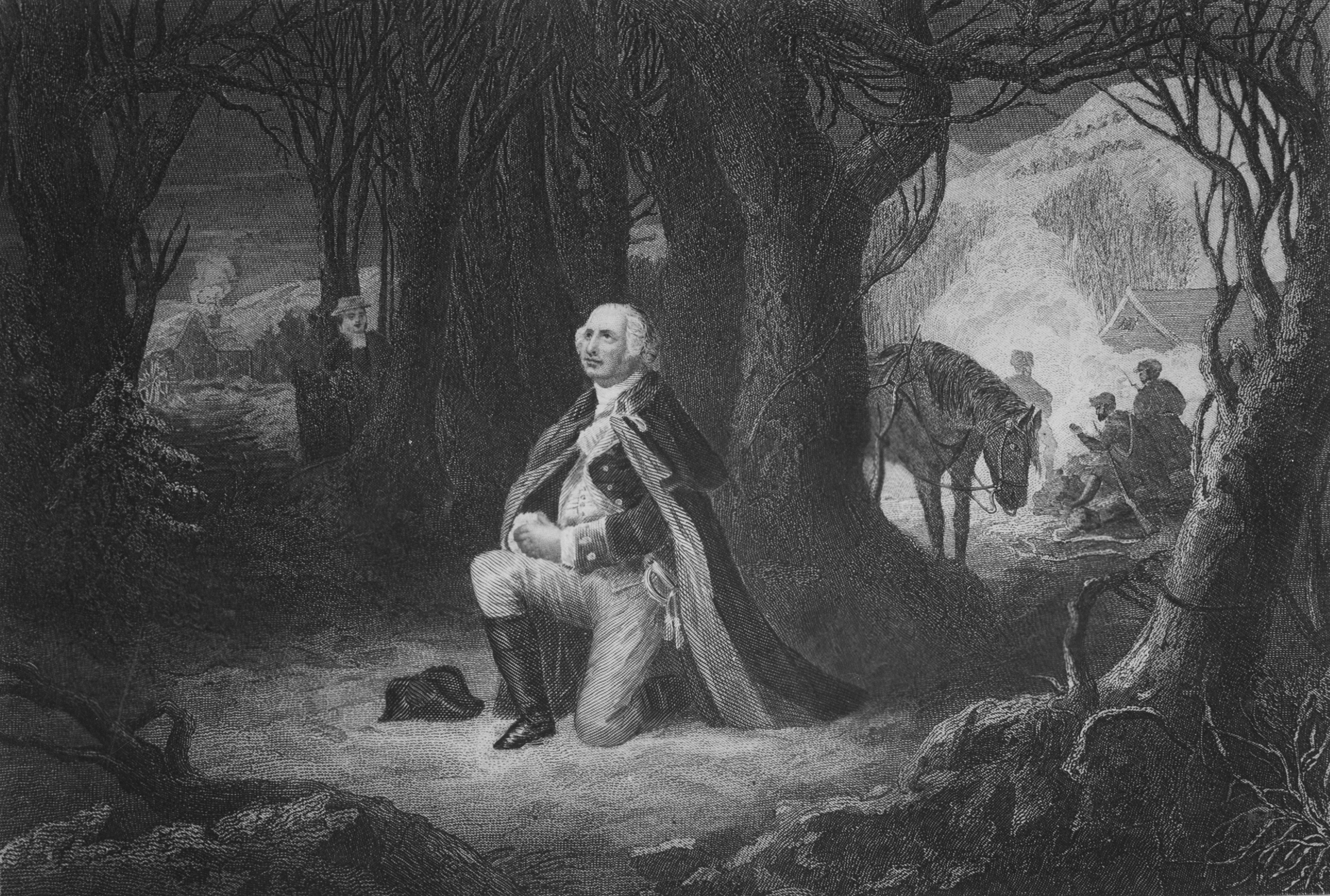
In his role as Commander-in-Chief of the Continental Army, General George Washington acknowledged a day of "fasting, humiliation and prayer" proclaimed by the Continental Congress to be held on Thursday, May 6, 1779. To enable his soldiers to observe the day, Washington ordered a one-day cessation of recreation and "unnecessary labor".

Historians Mark Noll and Luke E. Harlow write that accommodationism was the view held by the Founding Fathers of the United States:

The accommodationist perspective emphasizes rather that the First Amendment was clearly not intended to be antireligious--indeed, as already suggested, it was drafted precisely to protect the various religious practices of the states, including preferential establishments in some of them. Accommodationists therefore reinterpret the First Amendment to make of religious liberty a positive right, the exercise of which is to be encouraged by the government. By the same token, they believe that the First Amendment excludes only the direct establishment of, or preferential treatment for, a particular religion.

Alexis de Tocqueville noted that most Christian denominations produce similar political effects in society:

The sects that exist in the United States are innumerable. They all differ in respect to the worship which is due to the Creator; but they all agree in respect to the duties which are due from man to man.... Moreover, all the sects of the United States are comprised within the great unity of Christianity, and Christian morality is everywhere the same.... Christianity, therefore, reigns without obstacle, by universal consent; the consequence is ... that every principle of the moral world is fixed and determinate, although the political world is abandoned to the debates and experiments of men." (Tocqueville 1945, 314- 15; emphasis added).

In light of this broad consensus, many political scientists have noted that religion legitimizes political authority. Accommodationism also opines that "there is a common set of religiously based morals" with values such as "chastity, honesty, charity, and frugality [which are] ultimately regarded as having a religious basis, but are common to virtually all religious traditions".

Richard John Neuhaus likewise stated that religion provides a "sacred canopy" under which political activity can occur, stating:

Politics derives its directions from the ethos, from the cultural sensibilities that are the context of political action. The cultural context is shaped by our moral judgments and intuitions about how the world and how it ought to be. Again, for the great majority of Americans such moral judgments and intuitions are inseparable from religious belief. Perhaps this is true not just of the majority but of all of us, whether or not we call our ultimate values religious. In any event, whether it is called the Judeo-Christian ethic, or Christianity,... it is the dynamic of religion that holds the promise of binding together [religare] a nation in a way that may more nearly approximate civitas (1984, 60).

In light of what accommodationists see as the ethical dimension of religion, especially that of the Judeo-Christian tradition, in the United States "accommodationists tend to take a very narrow view of the establishment clause, arguing that this clause only requires nonpreferentialism".

In contrast to Tocqueville's view, different Christian denominations have taken opposing views on moral issues which have been the basis for law, such as slavery, contraception, abortion, Christianity and homosexuality, capital punishment, and war. Some of these disputes break down into the Christian right vs. Christian left. Christian libertarianism is directly opposed to the use of state power to support religious beliefs.

== Policy ==
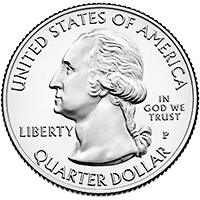
A quarter dollar with the United States' official motto "In God We Trust" on the obverse side

Accommodationism advocates providing aid to parochial schools, school vouchers that provide tax credit for private/parochial schools, as well as nonsectarian school prayer, as long as these policies apply equally to all religious institutions and individuals. In contrast to those advocating laicity, accommodationists view the expression of one's religious faith in the public sphere as a human right, such as the wearing of a cross necklace or headcovering, for example.

In the United States, religious-based federal holidays and observances, including the National Day of Prayer and Thanksgiving, as well as Christmas, exist based on accommodationist principles. Accommodationism also is seen in the national anthem since 1931, in the Pledge of Allegiance since 1954, and in the official motto of the United States since 1956, In God We Trust, as well as in the judicial oath So help me God as early as 1789.

== Supreme Court decisions ==
The first clear statement of accommodationist jurisprudence comes from Zorach v. Clauson (1952):

When the state encourages religious instruction or cooperates with religious authorities by adjusting the schedule of public events to sectarian needs, it follows the best of our traditions. For it then respects the religious nature of our people and accommodates the public service to their spiritual needs.

Everson v. Board of Education (1947) is most remembered for dicta about the wall of separation between church and state. Later "separationist" decisions like McCollum v. Board of Education were based on Everson.

In McGowan v. Maryland (1961) and Braunfeld v. Brown (1961) the Supreme Court did not accommodate the religious observance of Sabbatarians. They found that Sunday closing laws had a legitimate secular purpose despite their origin in Christian tradition. The secular interest in a common day of rest met the deferential standard of review applied to the legislation. Two years after Braunfeld, the Court decided in Sherbert v. Verner (1963) that the Free Exercise Clause required accommodation for religious observances or practices when generally applicable laws imposed a penalty or burden on religious liberty absent a compelling state interest.

Other cases relevant to the development of accommodationist jurisprudence are:

Board of Education v. Allen, Walz v. Tax Commission of the City of New York, Tilton v. Richardson, Roemer v. Board of Public Works of Maryland, CPERL v. Regan, Widmar v. Vincent, Larson v. Valente, United States v. Lee, Mueller v. Allen, Marsh v. Chambers, Lynch v. Donnelly, Alamo Foundation v. Secretary of Labor, Bowen v. Roy, Witters v. Washington Department of Services for the Blind, Goldman v. Weinberger, Corp. of Presiding Bishop v. Amos, Bowen v. Kendrick, Employment Division v. Smith, Hernandez v. Commissioner, Jimmy Swaggart Ministries v. Board of Equalization of California, Westside Community Board of Education v. Mergens, Lamb's Chapel v. Center Moriches Union Free School District, Zobrest v. Catalina Foothills School District, Rosenberger v. University of Virginia, Capitol Square Review & Advisory Board v. Pinette, Agostini v. Felton, City of Boerne v. Flores, Mitchell v. Helms, Good News Club v. Milford Central School, Zelman v. Simmons-Harris, Van Orden v. Perry, and Hein v. Freedom From Religion Foundation, among others.

Supreme Court justices regarded as accommodationist have included Byron White, William Rehnquist, Antonin Scalia, and Clarence Thomas.

== Politics ==
Organizations that promote accommodationism in the United States include The Becket Fund for Religious Liberty, Foundation for Moral Law, Lord's Day Alliance, Alliance Defending Freedom, Christian Coalition, Woman's Christian Temperance Union, and the First Liberty Institute.

Socially conservative political parties such as the Republican Party, Constitution Party, and American Solidarity Party espouse accommodationism.

Organizations that have argued against accommodationist policies in the United States include Americans United for Separation of Church and State, the Ayn Rand Institute, the Freedom From Religion Foundation, the Military Religious Freedom Foundation, People for the American Way, and the Secular Coalition for America.

== See also ==
- Blue laws
- Christian state
- Christian nationalism in the United States
- Christian Reconstructionism
- State atheism
- Separation of church and state in the United States
