= Capitol Square Review & Advisory Board v. Pinette =

Capitol Square Review and Advisory Board v. Pinette
- Supreme Court of the United States

Argued April 26, 1995 Decided June 29, 1995
- Full case name: Capitol Square Review and Advisory Board, et al., Petitioners v. Vincent J. Pinette, Donnie A. Carr, and Knights of the Ku Klux Klan
- Citations: 515 U.S. 753 (more) 115 S. Ct. 2440; 132 L. Ed. 2d 650; 1995 U.S. LEXIS 4465; 63 U.S.L.W. 4684; 95 Cal. Daily Op. Service 4990; 95 Daily Journal DAR 8540; 9 Fla. L. Weekly Fed. S 241
- Argument: Oral argument

Case history
- Prior: Preliminary injunction granted, 844 F. Supp. 1182 (S.D. Ohio 1993); stay denied, 510 U.S. 1307 (1993); affirmed, 30 F.3d 675 (6th Cir. 1994); cert. granted, 513 U.S. 1106 (1995).

Holding
- Religious expression does not violate the Establishment Clause when it is completely private and takes place in a designated public forum.

Court membership
- Chief Justice William Rehnquist Associate Justices John P. Stevens · Sandra Day O'Connor; Antonin Scalia · Anthony Kennedy; David Souter · Clarence Thomas; Ruth Bader Ginsburg · Stephen Breyer

Case opinions
- Majority: Scalia (parts I, II, III), joined by Rehnquist, O'Connor, Kennedy, Souter, Thomas, Breyer
- Concurrence: Scalia (part IV), joined by Rehnquist, Kennedy, Thomas
- Concurrence: Thomas
- Concurrence: O'Connor, joined by Souter, Breyer
- Concurrence: Souter, joined by O'Connor, Breyer
- Dissent: Stevens
- Dissent: Ginsburg

Laws applied
- U.S. Const. amend. I, Establishment Clause

Capitol Square Review & Advisory Board v. Pinette, 515 U.S. 753 (1995), is a United States Supreme Court case that focused on First Amendment rights and the Establishment Clause. Vincent Pinette, an active member of the Ku Klux Klan in Columbus, Ohio, wanted to place an unattended cross on the lawn of the Capitol Square during the 1993 Christmas season. Pinette and his fellow members of the KKK submitted their request. The advisory board originally denied this request. However, Pinette and the other members of the Ohio Chapter of the Klan fought this decision in the United States District Court for the Southern District of Ohio. The court found in favor of the Klan and the advisory board issued the permit. The Board appealed to the United States Court of Appeals, which affirmed the decision of the district court. The board made one last petition to the Supreme Court where the decision was made, by a vote of seven to two, that the Klan was permitted to display the cross at the public forum.

== Background ==
=== Historical context ===
The land in question was the Capitol Square in Columbus, Ohio. The ten-acre area had always been "available for discussion of public questions and for public activities an advisory board was responsible for regulating public access to the square, and to use the square a group simply had to submit an application to the board and meet several criteria that were neutral as to the speech content of the proposed use." In the past, the advisory board approved displays had included Christmas trees, menorahs, and various other religious-based decorations.

Beneath the surface, there was an issue that was more worrisome than the religious implications of the cross itself. The cross's association with the Ku Klux Klan was a concern to the State of Ohio. In 1993, racial tensions between whites and blacks in the United States were high. There were race riots in Los Angeles, the KKK had several active chapters across the country, and the United States was struggled to maintain equality and peace for all citizens. These underlying tensions accounted for much of the conflict in Capitol Square. Allowing the Ku Klux Klan to erect one of their white crosses on the lawn of the Statehouse in Ohio went much deeper than religion. However, as recognized by the Justices, "the facts before us and the opinions address only the Establishment Clause issue, and that is the sole question before us to decide." The advisory board could do nothing to prevent the Klan from displaying their cross on state-owned land.

=== The conflict ===
The case surrounded the issue of the interpretation of both the First Amendment and the Establishment Clause in the United States Constitution. The Capitol Square in Columbus, Ohio was a state-owned piece of land and any and all unattended displays had to be approved by the advisory board. However, over the years the area had become a public forum where people were permitted to hold public gatherings and leave unattended displays that were both secular and religious in nature. The job of the advisory board was to issue permits and regulate the content of the displays that took place in the Square. They were to make their decisions within the bounds of the First Amendment and the Establishment Clause. The Establishment Clause states that Congress cannot make a law "respecting an establishment of religion, or prohibiting the free exercise thereof," so the Board had to follow the same protocol in their decisions as well. The Board denied the Ku Klux Klan's permit request "on the grounds that the permit would violate the Establishment Clause," on the same day that they approved the display of a menorah on the square. Pinette and the other Klansmen appealed this decision.

== Opinion of the court ==
=== Summary of majority opinion ===
Justice Antonin Scalia delivered the majority opinion of the court on June 22, 1995. He was joined by Justice Anthony Kennedy and Chief Justice William Rehnquist. The court held that:

1. Private religious speech is protected under the free speech clause of the First Amendment
2. Although the state has the right to make content-based restrictions on speech, the board's denial of the Klan's application to display the cross on the statehouse square was not justified on the grounds of the establishment clause.

Traditionally, the square had been recognized as a public forum by the general population and because the display of religion was purely private it could not violate the Establishment Clause. The advisory board was still responsible for the content displayed on the square, but they could not intentionally block a religious display from being set up.

=== Concurrence ===
- Justice Clarence Thomas concurred with the Court's ruling on the Establishment Clause, but felt that the Klan's primary goal with the cross did not exclusively serve a religious purpose, but also included political motive. He wanted to make the note that the KKK was likely using the cross as both a religious display as well as an obvious political statement.
- Justice Sandra Day O'Connor concurred in part and concurred "in the judgment," but recognized the benefit of a sign disclaiming government sponsorship or endorsement on the Klan cross, which would make the State's role clear to the community. The state would benefit from prominently displaying signs that tell the public that they have no direct connection to anything displayed on the square.
- Justice David Souter concurred with the court's ruling, but he also wanted to add that he felt it was in the best interest of the State of Ohio to place a permanent sign that served as a disclaimer for any and all government sponsorship or endorsement of the display.

=== Dissenting opinion ===
- Justice John Paul Stevens dissented from the majority opinion, and was joined by Justice Ginsburg.

Stevens felt that the situation violated the establishment clause under the Endorsement Test. Even though Capitol Square in Ohio had turned into a public forum and it had allowed other various private groups to place unattended displays on the property, that did not prove that it was not in violation of the Establishment Clause. Stevens wanted to strengthen the separation of church and state.

- Justice Ruth Bader Ginsburg also dissented. She stated that if the Establishment Clause is truly intended to separate church and state then the government can neither permit, and the court cannot order, any religious items to be displayed. She felt that, if based on the Constitution, the board was not permitted to not allow certain displays to be shown, then by the same interpretation the court cannot force any particular display to be shown either.

== Historical significance ==
Capital Square Review v. Pinette is an important case because of its relationship to the various other cases dealing with the Establishment Clause and the First Amendment. Cases such as Lemon v. Kurtzman, Lynch v. Donnelly, and County of Allegheny v. ACLU are similarly themed situations. All of these cases showcase the Supreme Court's unclear stance on issues involving the First Amendment and the Establishment Clause.

- In Lemon v. Kurtzman, 403 U.S. 602 (1971), the Establishment of Religion Clause was brought into question. This 1971 case was one of the earlier cases, which involved the Supreme Court ruling that Pennsylvania's 1968 Nonpublic Elementary and Secondary Act violated the Establishment Clause of the First Amendment. The act established a system that had the public school system financially aiding nonpublic, and usually Catholic, schools for their school's expenses. The court decided that the act was unconstitutional, and their decision established the "Lemon Test" which offered a three-pronged approach to religion related cases.
- In Lynch v. Donnelly, 465 U.S. 668 (1984) the Supreme Court was faced with another issue with the Establishment Clause of the First Amendment. It was alleged that the seasonal Christmas display that included a crèche in Pawtucket, Rhode Island was unconstitutional and in violation of the Establishment Clause. Daniel Donnelly filed suit against Pawtucket mayor, Dennis Lynch and won in both the District Court and the Court of Appeals. However the U.S. Supreme Court overturned the past decisions and ruled that the Christmas display was not a government endorsement of any particular message and did not violate the Establishment Clause.
- In County of Allegheny v. ACLU, 492 U.S. 573 (1989) two separate holiday displays in Pittsburgh, Pennsylvania were challenged by the American Civil Liberties Union. The first display was a Christian nativity scene inside the Allegheny County Courthouse. The other display was a large Hanukkah menorah placed outside the City-County building. The court found the crèche in violation of the Establishment Clause because they felt the main purpose of the display was to endorse religion. However, the same court ruled that the menorah was within constitutional appropriateness because of its "particular physical setting."

All of these court cases, along with the numerous others, show that American courts have not articulated a consistent, clear rule explaining the government's relationship to religious expression, particularly if that expression occurs in government-supported settings. The Supreme Court is still searching for a consistent rationale for deciding cases in which the First Amendment's speech and establishment clauses intersect.

== See also ==
- Lemon v. Kurtzman
- Lynch v. Donnelly
- County of Allegheny v. ACLU
- Endorsement test
- With God, all things are possible
