= Elk Grove Unified School District v. Newdow =

- Supreme Court of the United States

Argued March 24, 2004 Decided June 14, 2004
- Full case name: Elk Grove Unified School District et al. v. Michael A. Newdow et al.
- Docket no.: 02-1624
- Citations: 542 U.S. 1 (more) 124 S. Ct. 2301; 159 L. Ed. 2d 98; 2004 U.S. LEXIS 4178; 72 U.S.L.W. 4457; 188 Ed. Law Rep. 17; 04 Cal. Daily Op. Serv. 5083; 2004 Daily Journal D.A.R. 7022,17 Fla. L. Weekly Fed. S 359;
- Argument: Oral argument

Case history
- Prior: On writ of certiorari to the U.S. Court of Appeals for the Ninth Circuit, 292 F.3d 597 (9th Cir. 2002), amended on denial of rehearing en banc, 328 F.3d 466 (9th Cir. 2003).
- Subsequent: Rehearing denied, 542 U.S. 961 (2004).

Holding
- A noncustodial parent did not have standing in federal court to allege that his child's school violated the Establishment Clause by leading students in the recital of the words "under God" added in 1954 to the Pledge of Allegiance. The issue of whether "under God" is constitutional, however, was not ruled on.

Court membership
- Chief Justice William Rehnquist Associate Justices John P. Stevens · Sandra Day O'Connor; Antonin Scalia · Anthony Kennedy; David Souter · Clarence Thomas; Ruth Bader Ginsburg · Stephen Breyer

Case opinions
- Majority: Stevens, joined by Kennedy, Souter, Ginsburg, Breyer
- Concurrence: Rehnquist (in judgment), joined by O'Connor; Thomas (Part I only)
- Concurrence: O'Connor (in judgment)
- Concurrence: Thomas (in judgment)
- Scalia took no part in the consideration or decision of the case.

Laws applied
- U.S. Const. amend. I

Elk Grove Unified School District v. Newdow, 542 U.S. 1 (2004), was a case decided by the U.S. Supreme Court. The lawsuit, originally filed as Newdow v. United States Congress, Elk Grove Unified School District, et al. in 2000, led to a 2002 ruling by the United States Court of Appeals for the Ninth Circuit that the words "under God" in the Pledge of Allegiance are an endorsement of religion and therefore violate the Establishment Clause of the First Amendment to the United States Constitution. The words had been added by a 1954 act of Congress that changed the phrase "one nation indivisible" into "one nation under God, indivisible". After an initial decision striking the congressionally added "under God", the superseding opinion on denial of rehearing en banc was more limited, holding that compelled recitation of the language by school teachers to students was invalid.

On June 14, 2004, the Supreme Court held Michael Newdow, as a noncustodial parent, did not have standing to bring the suit on his daughter's behalf. The mother was previously given sole legal custody of the daughter. The Ninth Circuit's decision was thus reversed as a matter of procedural law, so it did not consider the constitutional question raised by the case.

On January 3, 2005, a new suit was filed in the U.S. District Court for the Eastern District of California on behalf of three unnamed families. On September 14, 2005, District Court Judge Lawrence Karlton ruled in favor of Newdow. Citing the precedent of the 2002 ruling by the Ninth Circuit Court of Appeals, Judge Karlton issued an order enjoining the school district defendants from continuing their practices of leading children in the pledge with "under God." The case was later appealed to the Ninth Circuit under Newdow v. Carey and was reversed.

== U.S. District Court Case ==
Michael Newdow, a Sacramento, California attorney and emergency medicine physician, filed suit in March 2000 against the Elk Grove Unified School District. Newdow sued as the next friend on behalf of his daughter, who was enrolled in the Elk Grove public schools. He said the words "under God" in the Pledge of Allegiance amounted to an unconstitutional establishment of religion and that, as such, the daily recitation of the Pledge with the offending words interfered with his right to inculcate his daughter with his religious beliefs.

U.S. Magistrate Judge Peter A. Nowinski found the Pledge was constitutional. The District Court accepted the magistrate's finding and dismissed the case on June 21, 2000. Newdow then appealed.

== U.S. Court of Appeals, Ninth Circuit ==
The Ninth Circuit issued three opinions in the case, as outlined below.

=== Newdow I – June 26, 2002 ===
A three-judge panel of the court unanimously found Newdow had standing as a parent to challenge a practice that interferes with his right to direct the religious education of his daughter. On the merits of the case, the court reversed the trial court decision on a 2-to-1 vote, on June 26, 2002. The majority opinion was written by Judge Alfred T. Goodwin with a partial concurrence and partial dissent written by Judge Ferdinand F. Fernandez.

In reviewing the case, the court applied the Lemon Test, the Endorsement Test, and the Coercion Test. In doing so, the Court concluded recitation of the Pledge with the words "under God" included violated the Establishment Clause.

Fernandez asserted in his partial dissent that the religious content of the "under God" addition is so small that it is de minimis—so trivial as to be properly beneath judicial notice.

Public and congressional reaction to the Ninth Circuit's decision was decidedly negative. About 150 Members of Congress stood on the front steps of the Capitol and recited the Pledge including the words under God; and the Senate passed a non-binding resolution affirming the presence of under God by a unanimous vote.

=== Newdow II – December 4, 2002 ===
After the June opinion was issued, Sandra Banning—the mother of the child in question (Newdow and Banning were not married) filed a motion to intervene or, alternatively, to dismiss Newdow's complaint. She declared that although she and Newdow shared physical custody of their daughter, a California court order granted her exclusive legal custody of the child, including the sole right to represent her legal interests and make all decisions about her education and welfare. Banning further stated that her daughter is a Christian who believes in God and has no objection either to reciting or hearing others recite the Pledge of Allegiance, or to its reference to God. Banning said she believed her daughter would be harmed if the litigation were permitted to proceed because others might incorrectly perceive the child as sharing her father's atheist views. Banning accordingly concluded, as her daughter's sole legal custodian, that it was not in the child's interest to be a party to Newdow's lawsuit.

The court's second published opinion noted that Newdow no longer claimed to represent his daughter, but the judges unanimously concluded that Banning's sole legal custody of the child did not deprive Newdow, as a noncustodial parent, of Article Three standing to object to unconstitutional government action affecting his child. The court further held that under California law Newdow retained the right to expose his child to his particular religious views even if those views contradicted the mother's, and that Banning's objections as sole legal custodian did not defeat Newdow's right to seek redress for an alleged injury to his own parental interests.

=== Newdow III – February 28, 2003 ===
Defendants sought en banc review. This was denied and an amended order and opinion was issued in February 2003. The amended opinion omitted the initial opinion's discussion of Newdow's standing to challenge the 1954 Act and declined to determine whether Newdow was entitled to declaratory relief regarding the constitutionality of that Act.

On September 11, 2003, Newdow was awarded partial custody of his daughter, including joint legal custody.

=== Quotations and legal detail ===
From the 9th circuit hearing:

- Decided – the 1954 insertion of "under God" was made "to recognize a Supreme Being" and advance religion at a time "when the government was publicly inveighing against atheistic communism"—a fact which (according to the court) the federal government did not dispute. The court also noted that when President Dwight D. Eisenhower signed the act which added the phrase "under God," he also announced "From this day forward, the millions of our school children will daily proclaim in every city and town, every village and rural schoolhouse, the dedication of our Nation and our people to the Almighty."
- Judge Alfred Goodwin from the 9th Circuit remarked: "A profession that we are a nation 'under God' is identical, for Establishment Clause purposes, to a profession that we are a nation 'under Jesus,' a nation 'under Vishnu,' a nation 'under Zeus,' or a nation 'under no god,' because none of these professions can be neutral with respect to religion."

== U.S. Supreme Court ==
On March 24, 2004, the Supreme Court of the United States heard oral argument in the case to consider two questions: whether Newdow had standing as a noncustodial parent to challenge the School District's policy on recitation of the Pledge, and, if so, whether the policy offends the First Amendment.

Justice Antonin Scalia recused himself from the case after a request by Newdow that cited Scalia's disapproval of the Ninth Circuit decision in a public speech. According to Scalia, many lower courts often misinterpret the Establishment Clause, extending its proscription of religiosity in the public sphere.

On June 14, 2004, in an opinion written by Justice John Paul Stevens, five of the remaining eight justices – Stevens, Anthony Kennedy, Stephen Breyer, David Souter, and Ruth Bader Ginsburg – found Michael Newdow lacked standing to bring the case as "next friend" to his daughter, because Sandra Banning had sole legal custody of the child at the time – including exclusive authority over the girl's education. The majority also found that Michael Newdow lacked prudential standing to bring the case on behalf of himself due to the custody arrangement. This resulted in reversal of the Ninth Circuit's decision as a matter of procedural law.

The other three justices concurred in the judgment reversing the Ninth Circuit, but dissented on the issue of standing. They found Michael Newdow did have standing to bring the suit. Thus, they proceeded to examine the constitutional question, and in doing so they found it did not offend the Constitution. Chief Justice William Rehnquist wrote an opinion in which the other two joined in part; and both Justice Sandra Day O'Connor and Justice Clarence Thomas wrote their own separate opinions.

Rehnquist's opinion asserts the term "under God" does not endorse or establish religion but it actually asserts that the term merely acknowledges the nation's religious heritage, in particular the role of religion for the Founding Fathers of the United States. Thus, according to the opinion, the Pledge is a secular act rather than an act of indoctrination in religion or expression of religious devotion.

Justice Thomas, by contrast, asserts that finding the Pledge unconstitutional is an unjustifiable expansion of the meaning of "coercion" as that term is used in legal precedent: to prohibit compelling students in a "fair and real sense" by "subtle and indirect public and peer pressure" (see, Lee v. Weisman) to be prayerful, as well as prohibiting actual coercion by force of law and threat of penalty. Further, he argues that the Establishment Clause ought not be considered a right that attaches to individuals pursuant to the Incorporation Doctrine, because he believes the clause only prohibits interference by the federal government in the right of individual states to establish their own official religions – notwithstanding current majority opinion on the question is against states having such a right, as a result of the Incorporation Doctrine.

In a concurring opinion Justice O'Connor referenced the endorsement test and wrote: "When a court confronts a challenge to government-sponsored speech or displays, I continue to believe that the endorsement test “captures the essential command of the Establishment Clause, namely, that government must not make a person’s religious beliefs relevant to his or her standing in the political community by conveying a message ‘that religion or a particular religious belief is favored or preferred.’ ” County of Allegheny v. American Civil Liberties Union, Greater Pittsburgh Chapter, 492 U. S. 573, 627 (1989) (opinion of O’Connor, J.) (quoting Wallace v. Jaffree, 472 U. S. 38, 70 (1985) (O’Connor, J., concurring in judgment)).

== See also ==
- List of United States Supreme Court cases, volume 542
- List of United States Supreme Court cases
- Religious Heritage of America
- West Virginia State Board of Education v. Barnette (1943)
