= Ceremonial deism =

American ritual invocations of religion by government

Ceremonial deism is a legal term used in the United States to designate governmental religious references and practices deemed to be mere cultural rituals and not inherently religious because of long customary usage. Proposed examples of ceremonial deism include the reference to God introduced into the Pledge of Allegiance in 1954, the phrase "In God We Trust" on U.S. currency, and the Ohio state motto, "With God, all things are possible".

The term was coined in 1962 by the then-dean of Yale Law School, Eugene Rostow, and has been used since 1984 by the Supreme Court of the United States to assess exemptions from the Establishment Clause of the First Amendment to the U.S. Constitution.

== Usage by the Supreme Court ==
The first use of the term in a Supreme Court opinion is in Justice Brennan's dissenting opinion in Lynch v. Donnelly, 465 U.S. 668 (1984).

...I would suggest that such practices as the designation of "In God We Trust" as our national motto, or the references to God contained in the Pledge of Allegiance to the flag can best be understood, in Dean Rostow's apt phrase, as a form a "ceremonial deism," protected from Establishment Clause scrutiny chiefly because they have lost through rote repetition any significant religious content.

In Elk Grove Unified School District v. Newdow, 542 U.S. 1 (2004). Justice O'Connor, concurring in the opinion, invoked the term in her analysis of the nature of the phrase "under God" in the Pledge of Allegiance, saying in part

There are no de minimis violations of the Constitution – no constitutional harms so slight that the courts are obliged to ignore them. Given the values that the Establishment Clause was meant to serve, however, I believe that government can, in a discrete category of cases, acknowledge or refer to the divine without offending the Constitution. This category of "ceremonial deism" most clearly encompasses such things as the national motto ("In God We Trust"), religious references in traditional patriotic songs such as "The Star-Spangled Banner", and the words with which the Marshal of this Court opens each of its sessions ("God save the United States and this honorable Court"). These references are not minor trespasses upon the Establishment Clause to which I turn a blind eye. Instead, their history, character, and context prevent them from being constitutional violations at all. [emphasis added, citations omitted]

== Controversy ==
It has been unsuccessfully argued that the government requiring or promoting the phrase in "under God" violates protections against the establishment of religion guaranteed in the Establishment Clause of the First Amendment.

Secularist activist David Niose argues that reference to religion is not more likely to be harmless merely because it is "ceremonial." Used for the purpose of defending religious references by the government as harmless, he says the term "ceremonial deism" is grossly inaccurate and even dangerous.

Professor Martha Nussbaum at the University of Chicago Law School wrote in 2008 that "'Ceremonial Deism' is an odd name for a ritual affirmation that a Deist would be very reluctant to endorse, since Deists think of God as a rational causal principle but not as a personal judge and father."

== See also ==
- American civil religion
- Civil religion
- Deism
- Separation of church and state
