= Deism (disambiguation) =

Deism is the philosophical doctrine in which it is understood that God can be found only through the exercise of reason, and does not intervene in the Universe.

Deism may also refer to:

- Ceremonial deism, a doctrine created by the Supreme Court of the United States that permits the government to use general symbolic religious references
- Moralistic therapeutic deism, a term coined by Christian social scientists to describe theological beliefs of American teenagers circa 2005
- Pandeism, a pantheistic model of Deism
- Polydeism, a polytheistic model of Deism
- Christian deism, a branch that incorporates some Christian philosophy into deism, but still denies revelation and scripture

== See also ==
- De teaching, religion started in 1945 revolving around De
