= Town of Greece =

Town of Greece may refer to:

- Greece, New York
- Town of Greece v. Galloway, the 2014 US Supreme Court case in which the town of Greece, NY was the lead petitioner
