= Kennedy v. Bremerton School District =

- Supreme Court of the United States

Argued April 25, 2022 Decided June 27, 2022
- Full case name: Joseph A. Kennedy v. Bremerton School District
- Docket no.: 21-418
- Citations: 597 U.S. 507 (more) 2022 WL 2295034; 2022 U.S. LEXIS 3218
- Argument: Oral argument
- Decision: Opinion

Case history
- Prior: Preliminary injunction denied, No. 3:16-cv-05694 (W.D. Wash. September 19, 2016); Affirmed, 869 F.3d 813 (9th Cir. 2017); Rehearing en banc denied, 880 F.3d 1097 (9th Cir. 2018); Cert. denied, 139 S. Ct. 634 (2019); Summary judgment granted in favor of school district, 443 F. Supp. 3d 1223 (W.D. Wash. 2020); Affirmed, 991 F.3d 1004 (9th Cir. 2021); Rehearing en banc denied, 4 F.4th 910 (9th Cir. 2021); Cert. granted, 142 S. Ct. 857 (2022)

Holding
- The Free Exercise and Free Speech Clauses of the First Amendment protect an individual engaging in a personal religious observance from government reprisal; the Constitution neither mandates nor permits the government to suppress such religious expression.

Court membership
- Chief Justice John Roberts Associate Justices Clarence Thomas · Stephen Breyer; Samuel Alito · Sonia Sotomayor; Elena Kagan · Neil Gorsuch; Brett Kavanaugh · Amy Coney Barrett

Case opinions
- Majority: Gorsuch, joined by Roberts, Thomas, Alito, Barrett; Kavanaugh (except Part III–B)
- Concurrence: Thomas
- Concurrence: Alito
- Dissent: Sotomayor, joined by Breyer, Kagan

Laws applied
- U.S. Const. amend. I

Kennedy v. Bremerton School District, 597 U.S. 507 (2022), is a landmark decision by the United States Supreme Court in which the Court held, 6–3, that the government, while following the Establishment Clause, may not suppress an individual from engaging in personal religious observance, as doing so would violate the Free Speech and Free Exercise Clauses of the First Amendment.

The case involved Joseph Kennedy, a high school football coach in the public school system of Bremerton, Washington. Kennedy had taken the practice of praying at the middle of the field immediately after each game. The players and others soon joined the practice. The school board were concerned the practice would be seen as violating the Establishment Clause separating church and state. They attempted to negotiate with Kennedy to pray elsewhere or at a later time, but Kennedy continued the practice. His contract was not renewed, leading Kennedy to sue the board. Lower Courts, including the Ninth Circuit, ruled in favor of the school board and their argument regarding the Establishment Clause.

The majority opinion from the Supreme Court held that the Establishment Clause does not allow a government body to take a hostile view of religion in considering personal rights under the Free Speech and Free Exercise Clauses, and that the board acted improperly in not renewing Kennedy's contract. The decision all but overruled Lemon v. Kurtzman (1971) and abandoned the "Lemon test", which had been used to evaluate government actions within the scope of the Establishment Clause but had been falling out of favor for decades prior.

== Background ==
Joseph Kennedy is a practicing Christian and was an assistant football coach at Bremerton High School, a public school in Bremerton, Washington, starting in 2008. Inspired by the film Facing the Giants, Kennedy began praying after each football game, in the center of the field, at the 50-yard line.

Over time, Kennedy was joined by his players, and then by players and coaches from the opposing team. Kennedy continued the practice for seven years, but the school board only learned of the practice after an opposing team commented positively that the district would allow for the practice. The board became concerned that they would be seen as complicit in violating the separation of church and state by allowing for Kennedy's prayers to continue, as well as the implicit coercion that players may feel to join in on the prayer.

The board negotiated with Kennedy to reduce the public display of the prayer, offering to provide Kennedy with a private location for his prayer or suggesting that he held his prayer after the spectators had left, among other accommodations. Through the athletic director, Kennedy was warned that any such display should be clearly student-led. Kennedy wrote to his Facebook page that he felt he was likely being fired, and a few games later, he continued to pray after the game with additional coverage by the press and local politicians. Spectators knocked over members of the marching band while racing to join the prayer and directed profanity at Bremerton's head coach, who said he feared being "shot from the crowd."

After Kennedy continued this prayer for two more games, the district superintendent put him on paid leave for violating the school's policies and endangering students. The school's athletic director recommended that the school not re-hire Kennedy. Kennedy's contract for the year ended, and Kennedy did not re-apply the next year.

== Lower courts ==
Kennedy filed suit in the United States District Court for the Western District of Washington to regain his job, claiming the school's policy violated the Free Exercise Clause of the First Amendment. The board stated that they were trying to avoid any conflicts with the Establishment Clause by preventing public displays of faith at a public school. The district court ruled for the school board, and the Court of Appeals for the Ninth Circuit affirmed that decision in an opinion by Judge Milan Smith. In 2019, the Supreme Court denied his first petition for a writ of certiorari, but Justice Alito, joined by Thomas, Gorsuch, and Kavanaugh said the case was "troubling and may justify review in the future."

After conducting further fact-finding, the district court granted summary judgment in favor of the school district in March 2020. In March 2021, the Ninth Circuit again ruled for the school district on appeal. In July 2021, the full Ninth Circuit denied rehearing en banc. The Ninth Circuit was split in this denial; while Judge Milan Smith, writing for the majority in denying en banc, said that "Kennedy made it his mission to intertwine religion with football", Judge Diarmuid O'Scannlain in the dissenting opinion wrote that the majority went against Tinker v. Des Moines in that "It is axiomatic that teachers do not 'shed' their First Amendment protections 'at the schoolhouse gate'."

Kennedy filed a petition for a writ of certiorari.

Paul Clement and the First Liberty Institute, a conservative Christian organization, represented Kennedy.

== Supreme Court ==
The Supreme Court granted certiorari on January 14, 2022, and the Court heard oral arguments on April 25, 2022. According to Adam Liptak of The New York Times, the Court's conservative majority appeared to favor Kennedy's arguments though their questioning likely looked towards a narrow ruling that would not fully disrupt past case law on religion in public schools.

On June 27, 2022, the Supreme Court reversed the Ninth Circuit by a 6–3 vote. Justice Gorsuch wrote the majority opinion, while Justice Sotomayor wrote the dissenting opinion. Justices Thomas and Alito both wrote concurring opinions.

=== Opinion of the Court ===
Justice Gorsuch wrote that the school's actions against Kennedy violated his rights under both the Free Speech and Free Exercise Clauses of the First Amendment of the United States Constitution. He further wrote "We are aware of no historically sound understanding of the Establishment Clause that begins to '(make) it necessary for government to be hostile to religion' in this way". Gorsuch's opinion stated that Kennedy "offered his prayers quietly while his students were otherwise occupied" and that he made "short, private, personal prayer". Gorsuch rejected the school district's argument that it could prohibit Kennedy's post-game prayers so that students did not feel compelled to join him in praying. Gorsuch noted that "There is no indication in the record ... that anyone expressed any coercion concerns to the District about the quiet, postgame prayers that Mr. Kennedy asked to continue and that led to his suspension." Gorsuch distinguished this case from cases "in which this Court has found prayer involving public schools to be problematically coercive". Gorsuch reasoned that unlike those earlier cases, Kennedy's prayers "were not publicly broadcast or recited to a captive audience" and students "were not required or expected to participate". Gorsuch concluded that the school district's actions "rested on a mistaken view that it had a duty to ferret out and suppress religious observances even as it allows comparable secular speech", and that "The Constitution neither mandates nor tolerates that kind of discrimination".

The Court also reasoned that one of the main purposes of the First Amendment is to protect religious speech which was "a natural outgrowth of the framers' distrust of the government attempts to regulate religion" and further reasoning that "government suppression of speech has so commonly been directed precisely at religious speech that a free-speech clause without religion would be Hamlet without the prince."

=== Dissent ===
In the dissent, Justice Sotomayor criticized Gorsuch's interpretation of the facts of the case. Gorsuch had described the situation as "Mr. Kennedy prayed during a period when school employees were free to speak with a friend, call for a reservation at a restaurant, check email, or attend to other personal matters. He offered his prayers quietly while his students were otherwise occupied." Sotomayor in the dissent wrote the situation as "The record reveals that Kennedy had a long-standing practice of conducting demonstrative prayers on the 50-yard line of the football field. Kennedy consistently invited others to join his prayers and for years led student-athletes in prayer at the same time and location. The court ignores this history. The court also ignores the severe disruption to school events caused by Kennedy's conduct." Sotomayor also described the implicit coercion from peer pressure that had been demonstrated in the lower courts' proceedings. Sotomayor summarized these points as "To the degree the court portrays petitioner Joseph Kennedy's prayers as private and quiet, it misconstrues the facts." Sotomayor also wrote that the Supreme Court "has consistently recognized that school officials leading prayer is constitutionally impermissible." The majority ruling, she wrote, "charts a different path, yet again paying almost exclusive attention to the Free Exercise Clause's protection for individual religious exercise while giving short shrift to the Establishment Clause's prohibition on state establishment of religion".

Sotomayor included several photographs in her dissent, which is highly unusual for Court opinions. The photographs were of Kennedy during his post-game prayer, surrounded by players and others. Sotomayor stated that these photographs belied Gorsuch's description of Kennedy partaking in "short, private, personal prayer", and thus the majority opinion overlooked fundamental facts around the prayer sessions.

== Impact ==
The majority reasoning appears to effectively overrule Lemon v. Kurtzman (403 U.S. 602 (1971)), which had established a three-part Lemon test to determine if a government statute or similar action violated the Establishment Clause. While the Lemon test was popular in courts in the 1970s, it had lost favor starting in the 1980s, and continued to do so even after Justice Sandra Day O'Connor had refined the test in Agostini v. Felton (521 U.S. 203 (1997)). The Supreme Court had most recently considered the Lemon test in American Legion v. American Humanist Association, 588 U.S. 29 (2019), where several members of the Court rejected the use of the Lemon test. In Kennedy, the majority opinion did not explicitly overrule Lemon, but stated that they used a history-based approach "in place of Lemon and the endorsement test". Justice Sotomayor's dissent further establishes that the majority opinion "overrules" Lemon, and "calls into question decades of subsequent precedents that it deems offshoots". In Groff v. DeJoy, 600 U.S. 447 (2023) in an opinion for a unanimous Court, the Court described Lemon v. Kurtzman and thus the Lemon test as "now abrogated".

An analysis by Ian Millhiser of Vox suggests that the decision's impact may be limited, as the opinion's description of Kennedy's actions as "private" would have already been permissible under Lee v. Weisman.

Some religious groups claim the decision allows for school prayer, but other legal analysts find no support for the overruling of Abington School District v. Schempp, which disallows public school teachers from leading students in prayer. The Court in Kennedy found that Kennedy had not required or asked students to join him, but that they had instead joined him voluntarily, and thus there was no violation of Schempp. However these analyses did affirm that the design allows teachers to pray quietly on their own or with other teachers.

In March 2023, the school district announced that Kennedy would be employed as an assistant football coach for the 2023–24 school year. Although Kennedy had sued for his job back, in September 2023, after coaching one game, Kennedy resigned to move back to Florida, where he had resided since 2020; the Bremerton school district had argued the case was moot because Kennedy had moved away, but his lawyers stated at the time that the move was temporary and he was willing to move back.

== In popular culture ==
The case is referenced in the 2024 film Average Joe.
