= Town of Greece v. Galloway =

- Supreme Court of the United States

Argued November 6, 2013 Decided May 5, 2014
- Full case name: Town of Greece, New York v. Susan Galloway, et al.
- Docket no.: 12-696
- Citations: 572 U.S. 565 (more) 134 S. Ct. 1811; 188 L. Ed. 2d 835
- Argument: Oral argument

Case history
- Prior: Galloway v. Town of Greece, 732 F. Supp. 2d 195 (W.D.N.Y. 2010); reversed, 681 F.3d 20 (2d Cir. 2012); cert. granted, 569 U.S. 993 (2013).

Holding
- The town of Greece does not violate the First Amendment's Establishment Clause by opening its meetings with sectarian prayer that comports with America's tradition and doesn't coerce participation by nonadherents.

Court membership
- Chief Justice John Roberts Associate Justices Antonin Scalia · Anthony Kennedy; Clarence Thomas · Ruth Bader Ginsburg; Stephen Breyer · Samuel Alito; Sonia Sotomayor · Elena Kagan

Case opinions
- Majority: Kennedy (all but Part II-B), joined by Roberts, Scalia, Thomas, Alito
- Plurality: Kennedy (Part II-B), joined by Roberts, Alito
- Concurrence: Alito, joined by Scalia
- Concurrence: Thomas (in part), joined by Scalia (Part II)
- Dissent: Breyer
- Dissent: Kagan, joined by Ginsburg, Breyer, Sotomayor

Laws applied
- U.S. Const. amend. I

Town of Greece v. Galloway, 572 U.S. 565 (2014), is a United States Supreme Court case in which the Court decided that the Town of Greece, New York may permit volunteer chaplains to open each legislative session with a prayer. The plaintiffs were Susan Galloway and Linda Stephens, represented by Americans United for Separation of Church and State. They argued that the prayers violate the Establishment Clause of the First Amendment to the United States Constitution. The United States Court of Appeals for the Second Circuit ruled against the town, and on May 20, 2013 the Supreme Court agreed to rule on the issue. On May 5, 2014, the Supreme Court ruled 5–4 in favor of the Town of Greece, holding that the town's practice of beginning legislative sessions with prayer did not violate the Establishment Clause.

== Question before the court ==
Does the town of Greece, New York, impose an impermissible establishment of religion by opening its monthly board meetings with a prayer?

== Decision of the court ==
=== Majority opinion ===
By a 5–4 vote, the Court ruled that the town's practice did not violate the Establishment Clause. In the majority opinion, Justice Kennedy wrote that: "The town of Greece does not violate the First Amendment by opening its meetings with prayer that comports with our tradition and does not coerce participation by nonadherents." The Court concluded that the town's practice of opening its town board meetings with a prayer offered by clergy members does not violate the Establishment Clause when the practice is consistent with the tradition long followed by Congress and state legislatures, the town does not discriminate against minority faiths in determining who may offer a prayer, and the prayer does not coerce participation with non-adherents.

The majority held that sectarian prayers at government meetings are permissible under the Constitution. “To hold that invocations must be non-sectarian would force the legislatures sponsoring prayers and the courts deciding these cases to act as supervisors and censors of religious speech,” Kennedy wrote for himself and the conservative members on the court. Lawmakers and judges would otherwise have to police prayer, he wrote, involving "government in religious matters to a far greater degree than is the case under the town’s current practice of neither editing nor approving prayers in advance nor criticizing their content after the fact." This means that prayers are allowed to invoke particular religious affiliations without running afoul of the First Amendment prohibition against endorsement of religion at federal, state or local level.

Kennedy stated that U.S. Constitution doesn't require the town of Greece to search outside the town for chaplains from other faiths as long as the town maintains a policy of nondiscrimination. He included a restraint on legislature prayers, however, by stating that "[t]he purpose of legislative prayer is to lend gravity” to sessions where “the divisive business of governing” will take place. Noting that legislature prayer (in this context) should be “solemn and respectful in tone”, Kennedy went on to state that when legislative prayers are used as an opportunity to condemn or try to convert people who are not members of a particular religion, then these prayers would not conform with the Constitution. He added that, in general, "Absent a pattern of prayers that over time denigrate, proselytize, or betray an impermissible government purpose, a challenge based solely on the content of a particular prayer will not likely establish a constitutional violation."

Justice Kennedy wrote: “Legislative bodies do not engage in impermissible coercion merely by exposing constituents to prayer they would rather not hear and in which they need not participate.” According to the majority legislative prayers might be impermissible if they “denigrate nonbelievers or religious minorities, threaten damnation, or preach conversion,” or if the prayer giver is chosen in a religiously discriminatory way.

=== Concurring opinions ===
Justice Thomas wrote in a separate opinion (which Justice Scalia joined in part) that the case should be dismissed because the Establishment Clause does not apply to the states and its subdivisions, but only to Congress. He also stated that the Constitution would have only been violated if “actual legal coercion” like imposing taxes to pay for the church was used. Justice Alito wrote a separate concurring opinion (which Justice Scalia again joined in part) in which he addressed points that Justice Kagan raised in her dissent. In Alito's view, “the logical thrust of many of [Justice Kagan's] arguments is that prayer is never permissible prior to meetings of local government legislative bodies.”

=== Dissenting opinions ===
Justice Breyer filed a dissent that focused on the case facts and argued that the town must do more to make its legislative prayer inclusive of other faiths. Specifically, he argued that the town did not make a significant effort to inform non-Christian clergy about this event, and thus eventually marginalized religious minority populations.

Justice Kagan authored the main dissent, which Justices Ginsburg, Breyer and Sotomayor joined. Kagan noted three key differences between the case before the Court and Marsh (1983):

1. The Greece Town Council is not only a legislature, but also a place where the local government interacts with the local residents.
2. The prayers in Greece were not directed to lawmakers, but instead also to the local residents seeking to do business with the government.
3. The prayers in Greece were sectarian in nature.

Noting these differences, Kagan wrote: "So month in and month out for over a decade, prayers steeped in only one faith, addressed toward members of the public, commenced meetings to discuss local affairs and distribute government benefits. In my view, that practice does not square with the First Amendment’s promise that every citizen, irrespective of her religion, owns an equal share in her government." According to Kagan the providing equal treatment would have been easy: town council members could tell the chaplains that the prayers should be non-denominational, or they could have invited clergy from all different faiths to give the prayers, rather than focusing almost exclusively on Christian ministers. However, the town didn’t employ either of those measures.

== Reaction to ruling ==
Reactions to the Court's ruling were diverse. Christian conservatives and others who feel that religious expression has been overly curtailed in public settings were happy with the ruling. Eric Rassbach, deputy general counsel of the Becket Fund for Religious Liberty, called the decision "a great victory for religious liberty." Along with their supporters, the Jewish and atheist women who filed suit against the town of Greece were disappointed by the court's ruling. A number of Jewish organizations, including the American Jewish Committee and the Anti-Defamation League, had filed amici curiae briefs in support of the respondents, and expressed disappointment with the majority's decision. Secular groups were also disappointed. Daniel Mach, director of the ACLU Program on Freedom of Religion and Belief, for example, stated: "We are disappointed by today’s decision. Official religious favoritism should be off-limits under the Constitution. Town-sponsored sectarian prayer violates the basic rule requiring the government to stay neutral on matters of faith." Ira Lupu, a law professor emeritus at George Washington University who specializes in the First Amendment, called the court's ruling "a very bad decision" because it undermined the Establishment Clause. Lupu explained that the court decision "does not insist on any [...] reasonable effort to make prayer nonsectarian or to push for diversity. The majority faith in a particular community can dictate the prayers and minority faiths could be left out if they don’t step up and say, ‘Hey, what about us?'"

The Los Angeles Times pointed out that the decision divided the justices along religious lines, as well as ideological ones. All five justices in the majority were Catholics, and three out of the four dissenters were Jewish.

== Constitutional prescription for legislative prayers ==
According to Lyle Denniston the constitutional prescription for legislative prayers is based on eight factors. These factors are:

1. Legislative prayers are not confined to meetings of Congress or state legislatures, but may also be recited in the more intimate and familiar setting of local government meetings
2. The prayer portion of the meeting must be conducted only during a ceremonial part of the government body’s session, not mixed in with action on official policy
3. The body may invite anyone in the community to give a prayer and (if it has the money) could have a paid chaplain; The officials on the body may also join in the prayer by bowing their heads or showing other signs of religious devotion, such as crossing themselves
4. The body may not dictate what is in the prayers and what may not be in the prayers. A prayer may invoke the deity or deities of a given faith, and need not embrace the beliefs of multiple or all faiths
5. In allowing “sectarian” prayers, the body’s members may not “proselytize” i.e. promoting one faith as the true faith, and may not require persons of different faith preferences, or of no faith, to take part, and may not criticize them if they do not take part
6. The “sectarian” prayers may not disparage or discriminate against a specific faith, but officials need not go to extra lengths to make sure that all faiths do get represented in the prayer sessions — even if that means one faith winds up as the dominant message
7. Such prayers are permissible when most, if not all, of the audience is made up of adults
8. A court, in hearing a challenge to a prayer practice, is confined to examining “a pattern of prayers,” and does not have the authority to second-guess the content of individual prayer utterances; In judging such a pattern, the proper test is not whether it tends to put forth predominantly the beliefs of one faith, but whether it has the effect of coercing individuals who do not share that faith

== See also ==
- Marsh v. Chambers: holding that the practice of hiring a chaplain for the Nebraska state legislature did not violate the Establishment Clause of the First Amendment
- Mouvement laïque québécois v Saguenay (City): a similar Canadian case
