= With God, all things are possible =

Motto of the U.S. state of Ohio

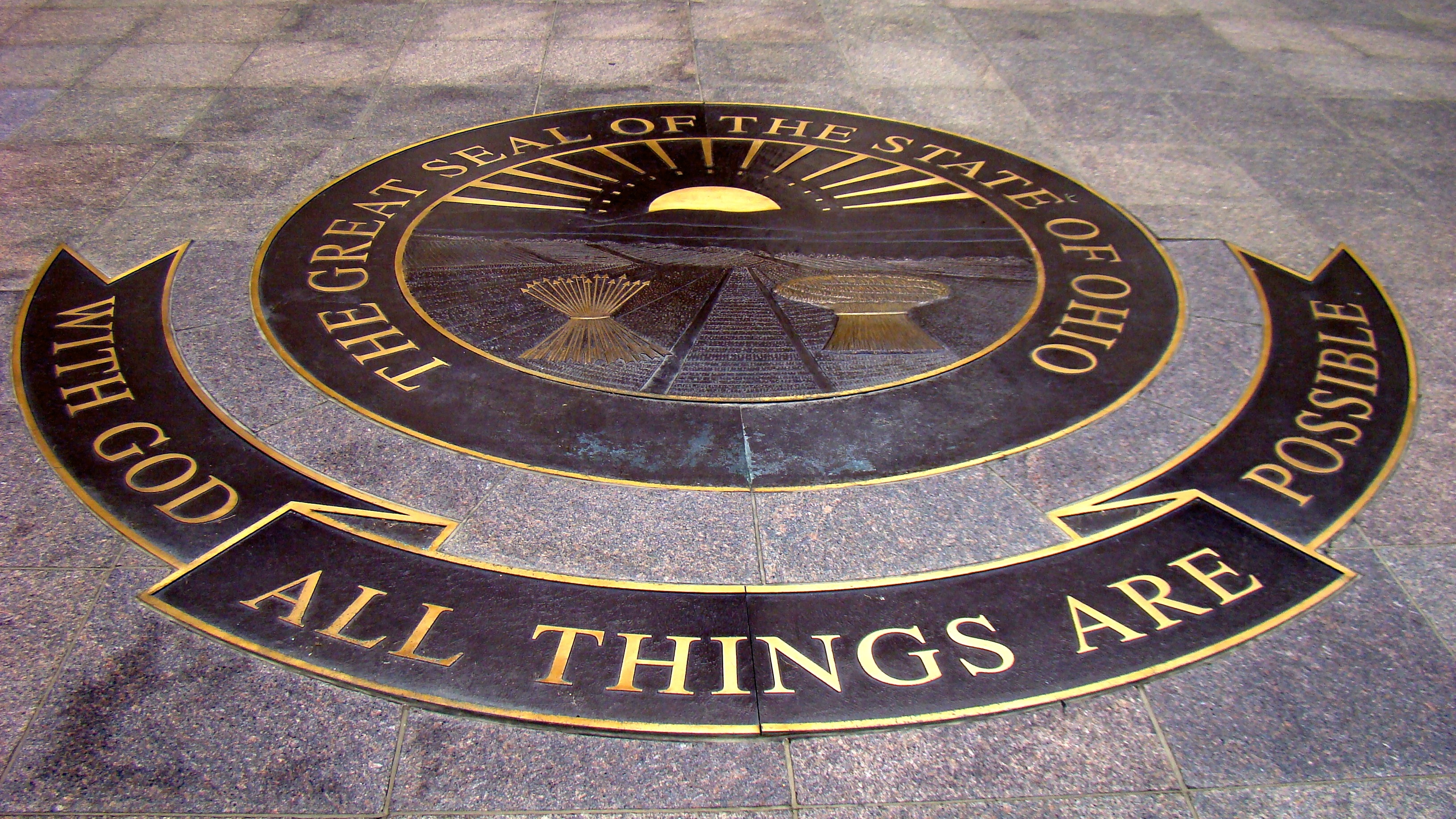
Ohio's seal and motto are displayed at the foot of the steps leading to the Ohio Statehouse's west entrance. This installation was the subject of a 1997 federal lawsuit that was decided in favor of the state.

With God, all things are possible is the motto of the U.S. state of Ohio. Quoted from the Gospel of Matthew, verse 19:26, it is the only state motto taken directly from the Bible (Greek: παρὰ δὲ θεῷ πάντα δυνατά, para de Theō panta dynata). It is defined in section 5.06 of the Ohio Revised Code and sometimes appears beneath the Seal of Ohio. The motto was adopted in 1959 and survived a federal constitutional challenge in 2001. The state maintains that it is a generic expression of optimism rather than an endorsement of a particular religion.

== Usage ==
The motto appears beneath the Seal of Ohio on the official letterhead of some state and county agencies. A large-scale version is displayed in a plaza near the Ohio Statehouse. The state motto appears on the flag of Franklin County, beneath the county seal, which is based on the state seal. School districts in Ohio are required to accept and display any donated copy of the motto that meets certain criteria.

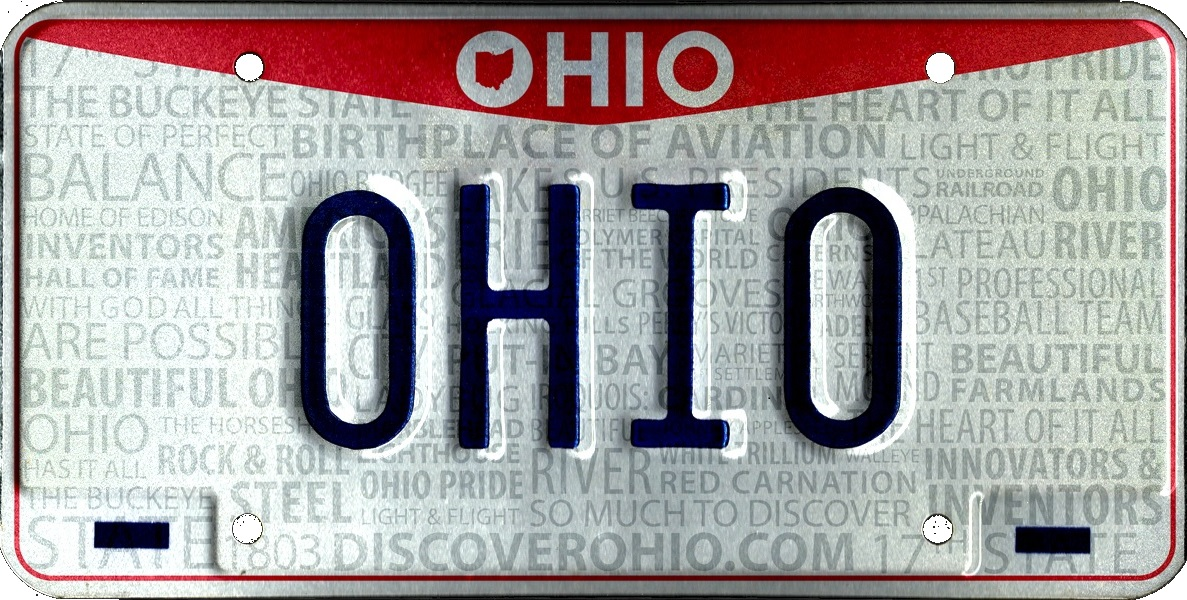
"Ohio Pride" license plate

The Ohio Bureau of Motor Vehicles uses the motto frequently. As one of 46 phrases printed on the "Ohio Pride" license plate design introduced on April 15, 2013, the motto is located on two lines in the center-left of the baseplate, below "Inventors Hall of Fame" and above "Beautiful Ohio". Driver's licenses and identification cards issued since 2019, including those that comply with Real ID requirements, incorporate the motto into a faint watermark on the obverse side.

Until 1997, the motto was found most commonly on income tax forms issued by the Ohio Department of Taxation. The department stopped using the motto in its annual report in 2002.

== History ==
=== Early mottos ===
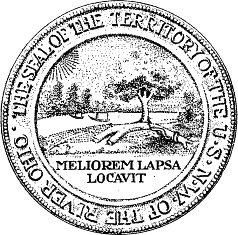
Seal of the Territory of the United States Northwest of the River Ohio

Ohio is considered the successor to the Northwest Territory, whose seal bore the Latin motto Meliorem lapsa locavit, meaning "He has planted one better than the one fallen." This motto, which may have come from the Seal of South Carolina, celebrated the internal improvements that succeeded in pushing back the wilderness. The seal's first recorded use was on a proclamation on July 26, 1788. Ohio's statehood in 1803 left it without a motto, though Meliorem lapsa locavit remains the motto of Belmont County.

On February 19, 1866, future Superintendent of Public Instruction William D. Henkle wrote to Secretary of State William Henry Smith, listing 125 Greek, Latin, and French phrases from which to choose a state motto. It was apparently thought that a motto of classical origin would be more dignified than one in English. On April 6, a Republican General Assembly passed 57 SB 172, adopting an elaborate new state seal and coat of arms. The coat of arms bore the motto Imperium in Imperio, Latin for "An Empire Within an Empire" or "Sovereignty Within Sovereignty", number 85 on Henkle's list. Governor Jacob Dolson Cox used the new seal and motto for the first time in a proclamation on November 5. Though it was intended to extol the state's grandeur, the motto was thought to be too pretentious and ironically recalled states' rights only a year after the Civil War. The historian Rush R. Sloane would later describe it as "a sort of climax of absurdity".

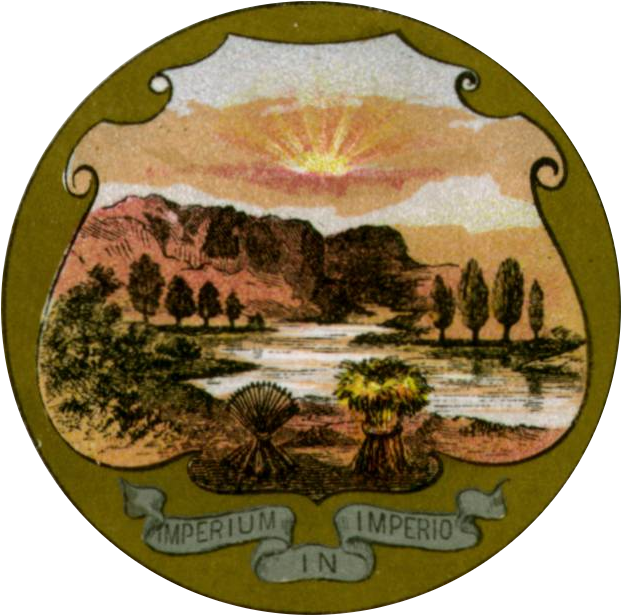
An illustration of the 1866 seal, which bears the motto Imperium in Imperio

On May 9, 1868, facing significant cost overruns associated with the new seal, a Democratic Assembly repealed the entire statute. Representative Jacob Wolf proposed to leave the motto in place, while Representative Francis Bates Pond proposed to replace it with Fiat justicia ruat cœlem, Latin for "Let justice be done even if the sky falls". Despite these legislators' efforts, the state was once again left without an official motto.

After 1868, there were hundreds of unsuccessful attempts to designate a new state motto. On June 29, 1933, the Senate passed a resolution declaring "Gateway to the West" to be the motto, but it did not pass the House of Representatives. In the early 1950s, the General Assembly sponsored a contest to choose a motto. In 1953, Representative Anna F. Heise O'Neil introduced a bill to designate a state motto in time for Ohio's sesquicentennial, but it was tabled. A 1957 proposal to place "Home of Light and Flight" on the seal would have celebrated Thomas Edison's birthplace in Milan and the Wright brothers' hometown of Dayton. The same year, State Senator Lowell Fess sponsored a bill backed by the Ohio American Legion that would have restored Imperium in Imperio.

=== Current motto ===
In March 1958, ten-year-old Jimmy Mastronardo of Cincinnati wrote to The Cincinnati Enquirer, pointing out that Ohio was the only one out of 48 states that lacked a motto. He recommended the phrase, "With God, all things are possible." Secretary of State Ted W. Brown encouraged him to promote his proposal to legislators and registered him as a lobbyist. He called his State Senator, William H. Deddens, who invited him to testify before the Senate State Government Committee on February 24, 1959. Mastronardo gathered 18,000 signatures in a petition drive, initially collecting them door to door and at a local food festival. On June 22, the House of Representatives voted unanimously to pass a bill adopting his motto, after he was given the unprecedented privilege of addressing the House from the speaker's podium. Governor Michael DiSalle signed 103 SB 193 into law in July, effective October 1, 1959. The motto made its first appearance on a state publication the following year, when the Secretary of State's office distributed a pamphlet about state symbols to schoolchildren.

Although the motto is widely understood to come from Jesus' words in an encounter with a rich young man, Mastronardo told reporters that he simply proposed his mother's favorite saying, unaware of its Biblical origin. At a statewide meeting of elections officials, Brown presented him with a Citation Award while a surprise guest, comedian Joe E. Brown, praised the twelve-year-old for his efforts. Mastronardo also received an Ohio flag embroidered with the motto.

=== Controversy ===
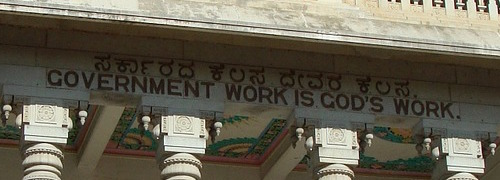
"Government Work Is God's Work" is inscribed in Kannada and English above the entrance to the Vidhana Soudha.

In April 1996, Governor George Voinovich returned from a trade mission to India, where he had seen the inscription "Government Work Is God's Work" (Kannada: ಸರ್ಕಾರದ ಕೆಲಸ ದೇವರ ಕೆಲಸ) prominently displayed on the Vidhana Soudha, the state capitol of Karnataka in Bangalore. This display gave him the idea for a similar inscription of Ohio's motto on the Statehouse in Columbus, as part of a $110 million renovation project that was nearing completion. He went public with the proposal at an observance of the National Day of Prayer in May. In November, the Capitol Square Review & Advisory Board decided to instead install a seal and motto on a plaza adjoining the Statehouse.

In 1997, just before the bronze fixture was to be installed, the Ohio affiliate of the American Civil Liberties Union (ACLU) sued the board, Voinovich, Secretary of State Bob Taft, and several other state officials. The ACLU alleged that the state had violated the Establishment Clause in the First Amendment to the U.S. Constitution and a similar clause in the Ohio Constitution. The state argued that its motto was not explicitly Christian, likening it to the national motto, "In God We Trust", and the use of "under God" in the Pledge of Allegiance. It was explained as "a compelling symbol of hope, inspiration and stick-to-it-iveness". The ACLU represented a Cleveland-area Presbyterian associate minister who objected to the state's trivialization of a quote attributed to Jesus. An ACLU-sponsored poll in the spring of 1997 found that only two percent of Summit County residents were aware of the motto.

On September 1, 1998, U.S. District Judge James L. Graham upheld the motto, finding it to be "generically theistic" without endorsing any particular denomination, but he enjoined the state from citing its source. The state carried out the installation within days. On April 25, 2000, a panel of the Sixth Circuit Court of Appeals reversed the lower court ruling, finding that "the words have no secular purpose and appear to be a government endorsement of the Christian religion". However, the Council on American–Islamic Relations disputed this finding, citing verse 2:106 of the Quran, while the World Vaisnava Association objected on the basis of Hindu scriptures.

By this time, there was significant public support for the motto. A June 2000 Ohio Poll conducted by the University of Cincinnati found that 62% of Ohioans were aware of the April ruling; of them, 11% agreed with it while 88% disagreed. The U.S. House of Representatives weighed in, voting 333–27 (with 66 voting "present") to pass a non-binding resolution, sponsored by Representatives Mike Oxley and Tony P. Hall of Ohio, that expressed support for Ohio's motto and others that refer to God. The entire Ohio delegation except for Representative Stephanie Tubbs Jones voted in favor. By December, Attorney General Betty Montgomery's office had received 15,000 letters of support regarding the ACLU case, more than on any other issue during her term.

On March 16, 2001, after an en banc review, the full Sixth Circuit Court of Appeals affirmed Judge Graham's ruling 9–4, leaving the motto in place. In a dissenting opinion, Judge Gilbert S. Merritt, Jr., expressed skepticism that the state fully intended to separate religious meaning from these words. He noted that Ohio officials had frequently explained the motto to their constituents in religious terms: Secretaries of State from Brown to Taft had cited Matthew 19:26 in pamphlets, and in 2000, Montgomery wrote to constituents that "the destruction of our state motto is part of a carefully constructed plan to strip America of every last symbol of our faith." On June 7, 2001, the ACLU declined to appeal the case further, fearing the repercussions of an adverse ruling by a conservative U.S. Supreme Court.

== Similar mottos ==
As noted in ACLU v. Capitol Square Review and Advisory Board, the federal government also invokes God in both its official motto, "In God We Trust", and in the Pledge of Allegiance. Three federal circuit courts have affirmed the national motto (see Aronow v. United States, O'Hair v. Murray, and Gaylor v. United States).

Besides Ohio, several other states, territories, and cities refer to God on their seals without quoting the Bible:

- South Dakota's seal bears the motto "Under God the people rule". Colorado's includes Nil sine numine, Latin for "Nothing without providence" or "Nothing without the Deity". Arizona's includes Ditat Deus, meaning "God enriches". The mottos of all three were chosen before statehood by territorial governors.
- Florida's seal bears the national motto.
- Although Kentucky's official motto is "United we stand, divided we fall", in 2002 the legislature also adopted Deo gratiam habeamus ("Let us be grateful to God") as the state's Latin motto.
- American Samoa's motto is Samoa Muamua Le Atua, which means "Samoa, let God be first".
- Boston's motto is Sicut patribus sit deus nobis, "As to our fathers may God be to us".

The coat of arms of Puerto Rico bears the motto Joannes est nomen ejus, meaning "John is his name". Like Ohio's motto, it is a quotation from the Bible, in this case the Gospel of Luke, chapter and verse 1:63. The motto is a reference to St. John the Baptist or San Juan Bautista, the island's original namesake. It reflects the commonwealth's strong Roman Catholic heritage as a former Spanish colony. Likewise, the reverse of Maryland's seal bears the motto, Scuto bonæ voluntatis tuæ coronasti nos, from Psalms 5:12, meaning "With favor Wilt Thou Compass Us as with a Shield".

== See also ==
- Capitol Square Review & Advisory Board v. Pinette, another case involving the ACLU and the Statehouse plaza
- Ceremonial deism – American ritual invocations of religion by government
