= Marsh v. Chambers =

- Supreme Court of the United States

Argued April 20, 1983 Decided July 5, 1983
- Full case name: Frank Marsh, State Treasurer et al. v. Ernest Chambers
- Citations: 463 U.S. 783 (more) 103 S.Ct. 3330; 77 L. Ed. 2d 1019; 1983 U.S. LEXIS 107

Case history
- Prior: Injunction granted, 504 F. Supp. 585 (D. Neb. 1980); injunction was affirmed and expounded upon, 675 F.2d 228 (8th Cir. 1982); cert. granted, 459 U.S. 966 (1982).

Holding
- The practice of hiring a chaplain for the Nebraska state legislature did not violate the Establishment Clause of the First Amendment.

Court membership
- Chief Justice Warren E. Burger Associate Justices William J. Brennan Jr. · Byron White; Thurgood Marshall · Harry Blackmun; Lewis F. Powell Jr. · William Rehnquist; John P. Stevens · Sandra Day O'Connor

Case opinions
- Majority: Burger, joined by White, Blackmun, Powell, Rehnquist, O'Connor
- Dissent: Brennan, joined by Marshall
- Dissent: Stevens

Laws applied
- U.S. Const. amend. I

Marsh v. Chambers, 463 U.S. 783 (1983), is a landmark court case in which the Supreme Court of the United States held that government funding for chaplains was constitutional because of the "unique history" of the United States. Three days before the ratification of the First Amendment in 1791, containing the Establishment Clause, the federal legislature authorised hiring a chaplain for opening sessions with prayer.

== Background ==
Nebraska state senator Ernie Chambers sued in federal court, claiming that the legislature's practice of opening sessions with a prayer offered by a state-supported chaplain was in violation of the Establishment Clause of the First Amendment. The district court held that the prayer did not violate the Constitution, but that state support for the chaplain did. The 8th Circuit Court of Appeals held that both practices violated the Constitution. The court of appeals applied the "Lemon test" from Lemon v. Kurtzman to evaluate the Establishment Clause challenge. This test requires a government practice to (1) have a secular purpose, (2) have a primary effect that neither advances nor inhibits religion, and (3) not foster excessive government entanglement with religion.

The court found that Nebraska's chaplaincy practice failed all three prongs:

1. Purpose and Effect: By selecting the same minister for 16 years and publishing his prayers, the practice had the purpose and primary effect of promoting a particular religious expression (specifically, Christianity).
2. Entanglement: Using state funds to pay the chaplain and publish the prayers constituted excessive entanglement between government and religion.

== Question presented ==
The question presented is whether paying a chaplain for religious services using taxpayer dollars violates the Establishment Clause of the First Amendment.

== Decision of the Court ==
In a 6–3 decision in favor of Marsh, Chief Justice Burger wrote the opinion for the majority. The Chief Justice begins the analysis by grounding the practice of legislative prayer in "history and tradition". He notes that opening public deliberative sessions with prayer has been a consistent feature of American government since the founding. The Court makes an original intent argument: since the First Congress authorized paid chaplains they obviously "saw no real threat to the Establishment Clause arising from a practice of prayer similar to that now challenged."

The Court reinforces its historical argument by citing Walz v. Tax Comm'n, which held that long-standing, unbroken tradition, while not granting a constitutional "vested right" is powerful evidence and "not something to be lightly cast aside." The Court analogizes legislative prayer to other forms of government accommodation or indirect aid to religion that have been upheld, such as providing school bus transportation, grants for religious college facilities, and tax exemptions for churches. The implication is that legislative prayer is a benign, traditional accommodation rather than an establishment of religion, posing no greater threat to the separation of church and state than these other accepted practices.

The Court finds that similar reasoning applies to Nebraska's practice. Furthermore, since the First Amendment applies to the states through the Fourteenth Amendment, it would be illogical to interpret it as imposing stricter limits on state legislatures than the Framers imposed on Congress.

The Court concludes that opening legislative sessions with prayer is a deeply ingrained tradition that does not constitute an establishment of religion. With over 200 years of continuous history, the practice is woven into the nation's social and governmental fabric. In this context, the prayer is not a move toward state-sponsored religion but a "tolerable acknowledgment of beliefs widely held among people of this country".

Regarding the Presbyterian chaplain's 16-year tenure, the Court sees no evidence of an "impermissible motive". The Court declines to evaluate the content of a prayer "where...there is no indication that the prayer opportunity has been exploited to proselytize or advance any one or to disparage any other, faith or belief". The Court finds no problem with the chaplain being paid by the state, pointing out that the Continental Congress paid its chaplain, and that it has been a common practice in the country since that time.

The Court acknowledges the sincere apprehension that legislative prayer could be a slippery slope toward an established religion. However, it finds this fear unfounded: "The unbroken practice for two centuries in the National Congress and for more than a century in Nebraska and in many other states gives abundant assurance that there is no real threat 'while this Court sits'". The opinion emphasizes that constitutional law requires distinguishing a "real threat" from a "mere shadow."

== Dissenting opinions ==
Justice Brennan, joined by Justice Marshall, wrote in a dissenting opinion,

The Court makes no pretense of subjecting Nebraska's practice of legislative prayer to any of the formal "tests" that have traditionally structured our inquiry under the Establishment Clause. That it fails to do so is, in a sense, a good thing, for it simply confirms that the Court is carving out an exception to the Establishment Clause, rather than reshaping Establishment Clause doctrine to accommodate legislative prayer. For my purposes, however, I must begin by demonstrating what should be obvious: that, if the Court were to judge legislative prayer through the unsentimental eye of our settled doctrine, it would have to strike it down as a clear violation of the Establishment Clause.

Citing Lemon v. Kurtzman (1971), Justice Brennan points out that the circumstances in the present case clearly do not meet the three-point Lemon test:

Every analysis in this area must begin with consideration of the cumulative criteria developed by the Court over many years. Three such tests may be gleaned from our cases. First, the statute [at issue] must have a secular legislative purpose; second, its principal or primary effect must be one that neither advances nor inhibits religion; finally, the statute must not foster "an excessive government entanglement with religion."

Justice Stevens also wrote a dissenting opinion, where he essentially argues that religious minorities of any particular region will be disenfranchised by the majority ruling, stating:

Prayers may be said by a Catholic priest in the Massachusetts Legislature and by a Presbyterian minister in the Nebraska Legislature, but I would not expect to find a Jehovah's Witness or a disciple of Mary Baker Eddy or the Reverend Moon serving as the official chaplain in any state legislature. Regardless of the motivation of the majority that exercises the power to appoint the chaplain, it seems plain to me that the designation of a member of one religious faith to serve as the sole official chaplain of a state legislature for a period of 16 years constitutes the preference of one faith over another in violation of the Establishment Clause of the First Amendment."

== Subsequent history ==
In Town of Greece v. Galloway (2014) the Court held that the Establishment Clause is not violated when a town board begins their sessions with a sectarian prayer, so long as the town does not discriminate against minority faiths in determining who may offer a prayer.

== See also ==
- List of United States Supreme Court cases, volume 463
