= Tilton v. Richardson =

- Supreme Court of the United States

Argued March 2, 1971 Decided June 28, 1971
- Full case name: Tilton v. Richardson
- Citations: 403 U.S. 672 (more) 9 S. Ct. 2091; 29 L. Ed. 2d 790

Case history
- Prior: 312 F. Supp. 11911

Holding
- One-time construction grants to religious colleges and universities under Title I of the Higher Education Facilities Act of 1963 do not violate the Establishment or Free Exercise clauses of the First Amendment.

Court membership
- Chief Justice Warren E. Burger Associate Justices Hugo Black · William O. Douglas; John M. Harlan II · William J. Brennan Jr. Potter Stewart · Byron White; Thurgood Marshall · Harry Blackmun

Case opinions
- Plurality: Burger, joined by Harlan, Stewart, Blackmun
- Concurrence: White
- Dissent: Douglas, joined by Black, Marshall
- Dissent: Brennan

Laws applied
- U.S. Const. amends. I

Tilton v. Richardson, 403 U.S. 672 (1971), was a United States Supreme Court case holding that one-time construction grants to religious colleges and universities under Title I of the Higher Education Facilities Act of 1963 do not violate the Establishment or Free Exercise clauses of the First Amendment. Applying the effect prong of the Lemon test, the Court severs and strikes down one provision of the Act that limited enforcement of secular use restrictions to a 20-year period.

== Background ==
Title I of the Higher Education Facilities Act of 1963 provided construction grants limited to buildings and facilities that were "exclusively for secular educational, purposes". (Note: Tilton v. Richardson, 403 U.S. 672, 674)

Federal taxpayers filed a lawsuit challenging five projects at four church-related colleges in Connecticut. The district court found that the act was constitutional.

== Supreme Court ==
In a split 5–4 decision the Court upheld the constitutionality of the federal construction grants under the Establishment and Free Exercise clauses. Tilton was decided on the same day as Lemon v. Kurtzman and the Lemon criteria were applied for the Establishment question.

=== Plurality decision ===
Writing for the Court, Chief Justice Warren Burger explained that theLemon criteria were "guidelines with which to identify instances in which the objectives of the Religion Clauses have been impaired". They found that the act had a legitimate secular purpose to accommodate "rapidly growing" numbers of students pursuing higher education. Citing Bradfield v. Roberts, Everson v. Board of Education, Board of Ed. of Central School Dist. No. 1 v. Allen and Walz v. Tax Comm'n of the City of New York they rejected appellants "simplistic argument" that the Establishment Clause requires a blanket ban on financial aid to religious organizations: "The crucial question is not whether some benefit accrues to a religious institution as a consequence of the legislative program, but whether its principal or primary effect advances religion". (Note: Tilton, 403 U.S. at 679)

Allen is remembered for expanding Everson's holding upholding the constitutionality of a student transportation reimbursement where the benefit to religious schools was considered incidental to the secular legislative purpose of providing safe transportation to students. Even though textbooks loans were more closely related to the teaching function of the school than the transportation reimbursement upheld in Everson the Court would not assume that "religiosity in parochial elementary and secondary schools necessarily permeates the secular education that they provide" without evidence. (Note: Tilton, 403 U.S. at 681)

Based on the district court's finding that none of the schools involved in the Tilton case had violated the § 751(a)(2) restrictions that prohibited the display of religious symbols and non-secular activities in federally funded buildings the court upheld the constitutionality of the law providing construction grants for exclusively secular-use facilities. The only provision that presented an Establishment concern was § 754(b)(2) placing a 20-year limit on enforceability of the recipient's obligations to not use the facility for religious instruction or worship: "The restrictive obligations of a recipient institution...cannot, compatibly with the Religion Clauses, expire while the building has substantial value". This provision was severed. (Note: Tilton, 403 U.S. at 684)

The Court said inTilton that the "minimal" inspections required to enforce compliance with secular use restrictions will not result in excessive entanglements between government and religious authorities. College students "are less impressionable and less susceptible to religious indoctrination". The program does not subsidize teachers like the statutes in Lemon. The entanglement that would result from government surveillance over teachers would be excessive. There is less entanglement with a one-time construction grant than continuing payments of teacher salaries that require audits of school expenditures. (Note: Tilton, 403 U.S. at 685-88)

The Court did not find there was any coercion directed to religious belief or activity that would infringe the Free Exercise rights of taxpayers. (Note: Tilton, 403 U.S. at 689)
