= Alton Lemon =

Civil rights activist (1928–2013)

- Born: October 19, 1928; McDonough, Georgia
- Died: May 4, 2013 (aged 84); Rydal Park, near Jenkintown, Pennsylvania

Alton Toussaint Lemon (19 October 1928 – 4 May 2013) was a social worker and civil rights activist best known as named lead plaintiff in a landmark U.S. Supreme Court case on the separation of church and state. He was a recipient of the "First Amendment Hero" award and was the first African American head of the Philadelphia Ethical Society.

== Early life and education ==
Lemon was born on October 19, 1928, in McDonough, Georgia. He was the second of three children. His father owned a tailor shop in McDonough. He grew up in Atlanta, Georgia, attending public schools there through the tenth grade. He later graduated from a private high school in Lawrenceville, Virginia. He received a bachelor's degree in mathematics in 1950 from Morehouse College. In 1951, he married Augusta Ramsey, a nurse, in Birmingham, Alabama. The couple then moved to Philadelphia, Pennsylvania, where she had obtained work. They had a son, Anthony George and two grandchildren, Ayanna and Athena. In 1965, he received a master's degree in social work from the University of Pennsylvania.

== Career and views ==
Lemon served for two years in the US Army and worked at the Aberdeen Proving Ground as a civilian for the Department of Defense. As a social worker Lemon had a long career in public service and community organizing. Lemon was a lifetime member of the ACLU and the National Association for the Advancement of Colored People (NAACP). He worked for local community organizations, the Department of Housing and Urban Development, and the Department of Energy (as an equal opportunity and training officer), retiring in 1987. He remained active in retirement serving as the first African American head of the Philadelphia Ethical Society and president of the Philadelphia chapter of the Morehouse College Alumni Association.

At this point in my life I seriously wonder why we have religion. I am not so sure it does more good than harm. I think that the battle for church-state separation has to be a continuing fight.

—Alton Lemon

Lemon described his philosophy as, "'ethical humanism'—reliance on reason in conducting human affairs." He received the "First Amendment Hero" award in 2003 from the Freedom From Religion Foundation, which also recognized him as an "honorary officer".

== Lemon v. Kurtzman ==
Lemon was the named lead plaintiff in Lemon v. Kurtzman a 1971 case in which the U.S. Supreme Court ruled that a Pennsylvania law allowing public tax funds to be paid to parochial schools violated the Establishment Clause of the First Amendment to the United States Constitution. It is one of the most highly cited Supreme Court decisions. The decision established the Lemon Test a three-pronged evaluation of legislation related to religion. The Lemon Test has been applied in Supreme Court cases involving prayer at graduations and other school functions, public displays of religious symbols and the notable case on teaching intelligent design in schools, Kitzmiller v. Dover Area School District.

Lemon was asked to join the case after criticizing the Pennsylvania law at a Philadelphia meeting of the American Civil Liberties Union (ACLU). Lemon had standing as a tax-paying citizen of Pennsylvania with a child attending public school there. Newspapers in Philadelphia called Lemon a "First Amendment hero" at the time of case for volunteering to be a named plaintiff. Lemon expressed surprise at having a leading piece of First Amendment jurisprudence bear his name. In 2003 he said, "I still don't know why my name came out first on this case." Law professor Douglas Laycock offers the explanation that choosing an African American was related to the background of a push back against school desegregation at the time. Thirty years after the decision Lemon was displeased at the erosion of the precedent stating, "separation of church and state is gradually losing ground, I regret to say." While he never sought public recognition for his involvement with the Supreme Court case, in 2004 he expressed satisfaction with the decision and pride in his participation.

== Death ==
Lemon died of Alzheimer's disease on May 4, 2013, in Rydal Park, near Jenkintown, Pennsylvania. He donated his body to science.

== See also ==
- Ethical movement
- Humanism
