= County of Allegheny v. American Civil Liberties Union =

- Supreme Court of the United States

Argued February 22, 1989 Decided July 3, 1989
- Full case name: County of Allegheny, et al. v. American Civil Liberties Union, Greater Pittsburgh Chapter, et al.
- Citations: 492 U.S. 573 (more) 109 S. Ct. 3086; 106 L. Ed. 2d 472; 1989 U.S. LEXIS 3468

Holding
- Display of the menorah in this setting was constitutional, while the Christian nativity scene in this particular setting was unconstitutional.

Court membership
- Chief Justice William Rehnquist Associate Justices William J. Brennan Jr. · Byron White; Thurgood Marshall · Harry Blackmun; John P. Stevens · Sandra Day O'Connor; Antonin Scalia · Anthony Kennedy

Case opinions
- Majority: Blackmun, joined by Brennan, Marshall, Stevens, O'Connor (Parts III-A, IV, V)
- Plurality: Blackmun, joined by Stevens, O'Connor (Parts I, II); Stevens (Part III-B); O'Connor (Part VII); none (Part VI)
- Concurrence: O'Connor, joined by Brennan, Stevens (Part II)
- Concur/dissent: Stevens, joined by Brennan, Marshall
- Concur/dissent: Brennan, joined by Marshall, Stevens
- Concur/dissent: Kennedy, joined by Rehnquist, White, Scalia

Laws applied
- U.S. Const. amend. I

County of Allegheny v. American Civil Liberties Union, 492 U.S. 573 (1989), was a United States Supreme Court case in which the Court considered the constitutionality of two recurring Christmas and Hanukkah holiday displays located on public property in downtown Pittsburgh. The first, a nativity scene (crèche), was placed on the grand staircase of the Allegheny County Courthouse. The second was an 18-foot (5.5 m) public Hanukkah menorah, placed just outside the City-County Building next to the city's 45-foot (14 m) decorated Christmas tree and a sign saluting liberty. The legality of the Christmas tree display was not considered in this case.

In a complex and fragmented decision, the majority held that the County of Allegheny violated the Establishment Clause by displaying a crèche in the county courthouse, because the "principal or primary effect" of the display was to advance religion within the meaning of Lemon v. Kurtzman (1971), when viewed in its overall context. Moreover, in contrast to Lynch v. Donnelly (1984), nothing in the crèche's setting detracted from that message.

A different majority held that the menorah display did not have the prohibited effect of endorsing religion, given its "particular physical setting". Its combined display with a Christmas tree and a sign saluting liberty did not impermissibly endorse both the Christian and Jewish faiths, but simply recognized that both Christmas and Hanukkah are part of the same winter-holiday season, which, the Court found, had attained a secular status in U.S. society.

== Background ==
Since 1981, the Holy Name Society of Pittsburgh had placed a crèche on the grand staircase of the Allegheny County Courthouse. In 1986, the county also placed poinsettia plants and two Christmas trees around the crèche. Attached to the manger was an angel carrying a banner, with the words "Gloria in excelsis Deo!"

The Pittsburgh City-County Building (serving as City Hall) is separate from the courthouse, and is jointly owned by the city and county. The city had placed a 45-foot Christmas tree in front of the building "for a number of years". In 1986, the city placed a plaque beneath the tree with the mayor's name, entitled "Salute to Liberty". Below the title, the sign stated: "During this holiday season, the city of Pittsburgh salutes liberty. Let these festive lights remind us that we are the keepers of the flame of liberty and our legacy of freedom." Since 1982, the city had also placed a menorah with the Christmas tree in front of the City-County Building. The city did not own the menorah, but placed, removed, and stored it each year. The menorah was owned by Chabad House, Pittsburgh's Lubavitch Center.

On December 10, 1986, the Greater Pittsburgh Chapter of the ACLU and seven local residents sued the city of Pittsburgh and the county of Allegheny. The lawsuit, argued by Roslyn Litman, sought to enjoin the county from displaying the crèche in the courthouse and the city from displaying the menorah in front of the city-county building. Chabad was allowed to intervene to defend the menorah. The plaintiffs argued that the displays violated the Establishment Clause, applicable via the Fourteenth Amendment. On May 8, 1987, the District Court denied the injunction to remove either the crèche or the menorah. The Court of Appeals for the Third Circuit reversed the district court's ruling, stating that the two displays each violated the Establishment Clause. The county, city, and Chabad all subsequently filed petitions for certiorari.

== Opinion of the Court ==
The majority holding of the Court found that the crèche display violated the Establishment Clause while the menorah did not. In her opinion, Justice O'Connor explained the slightly different reasons why she also supports Justice Blackmun's holding. Justice Brennan, joined by Justices Stevens and Marshall, joined parts III-A, IV, and V of Blackmun's opinion. However, Brennan disagreed with Blackmun and O'Connor's respective opinions by stating that the menorah and Christmas tree are also violations of the Establishment Clause. Justice Kennedy, joined by Chief Justice Rehnquist and Justices White and Scalia, disagreed with Blackmun's reasoning in part VI and agreed with the previous judgment of the district court. Justice Stevens, in his own opinion, stated that the appeals court was correct in its ruling. He believed that the menorah display, together with the Christmas tree, signified a double violation of the establishment clause. Since the menorah is a religious symbol, he felt that Judaism and Christianity were being endorsed by the government to the exclusion of all other religions.

The following table breaks down the Justices' opinions:

| Justice | Nativity scene | Menorah |
|---|---|---|
| Blackmun | violation | constitutional |
| O'Connor | violation | constitutional |
| Brennan | violation | violation |
| Stevens | violation | violation |
| Marshall | violation | violation |
| Kennedy | constitutional | constitutional |
| White | constitutional | constitutional |
| Scalia | constitutional | constitutional |
| Rehnquist | constitutional | constitutional |

=== Part I ===
Justices Blackmun and O'Connor both believed that the Christmas tree is a secular symbol in American society today. However, Justice O'Connor states that the "menorah standing alone may well send a message of endorsement of the Jewish faith". By placing the menorah with the Christmas tree, she believed that the city is representing the pluralism of the freedom of religion.

=== Part II ===
Justice Blackmun believed that the menorah has become a secular symbol, emblematic of the "winter-holiday season". Justice Brennan disagreed with this, stating that the menorah retains religious meaning. Justice O'Connor joined in Justice Blackmun's belief.

=== Part III ===
In part III-A, Justice Blackmun discussed the Establishment Clause. In III-B, Justice Blackmun sets the issue of the case as deciding if the crèche and menorah have "the total effect of endorsing or disapproving religious beliefs." Justice Brennan dissented from the opinions of Justices O'Connor and Blackmun, which had proposed that the presence of multiple religious displays, so long as one is not favored over the other. Justices Blackmun and Brennan also argue that Hanukkah's social prominence in America may be due to the proximity to Christmas. Justice Blackmun stated that December is not the "winter holiday season" for Judaism, and believes that the presentation of the menorah with the Christmas tree promotes a "Christianized version of Judaism". Justice Brennan questions why the city recognizes a "relatively minor Jewish holiday" while not the "far more significant Jewish holidays of Rosh Hashanah and Yom Kippur".

=== Part IV ===
Justice Blackmun found that the crèche endorsed a "patently Christian message," and permanently enjoined its display in the context presented. In his dissenting opinion, Justice Kennedy believed that the crèche does not fail the second prong of the Lemon test, and its display is therefore constitutional. He also concurred that the display of the menorah is constitutional.

=== Part V ===
Throughout Part V, Justice Blackmun attacked the reasoning of Justice Kennedy. Citing Marsh v. Chambers (1983), Justice Kennedy argued that the Constitution allows the display of the crèche. Justice Blackmun disagreed with Justice Kennedy's logic, arguing that Justice Kennedy advocates a lower level of scrutiny when evaluating the Establishment Clause.

=== Part VI ===
Justice Blackmun found that the menorah display did not endorse religion in violation of the Establishment Clause. However, the Court remanded the decision to the appeals court to decide whether the menorah failed the Lemon test on the "entanglement" and "purpose" prongs, which were not considered in this case.

=== Part VII ===
Justice Blackmun sums up the opinion, stating that the display of the crèche in the courthouse is unconstitutional. He also states that the display of the menorah in this "particular physical setting" is constitutional. The cases were remanded to the appeals court for further proceedings in light of this decision.

== See also ==
- List of United States Supreme Court cases, volume 492
- List of United States Supreme Court cases
- Lists of United States Supreme Court cases by volume
- List of United States Supreme Court cases by the Rehnquist Court
- Lemon v. Kurtzman (1971)
- Lynch v. Donnelly (1984)
- Pittsburgh Crèche
