= Walz v. Tax Commission of the City of New York =

Walz v. Tax Commission
- Supreme Court of the United States

Argued November 19, 1969 Decided May 4, 1970
- Full case name: Walz v. Tax Commission of the City of New York
- Citations: 397 U.S. 664 (more) 90 S. Ct. 1409; 25 L. Ed. 2d 697; 1970 U.S. LEXIS 43
- Argument: Oral argument

Case history
- Prior: Summary judgment affirmed by New York Court of Appeals, 24 N.Y.2d 30, 246 N.E.2d 517 (1969); probable jurisdiction noted, 395 U.S. 957 (1969).

Holding
- Grants of tax exemption to religious organizations do not violate the Establishment Clause of the First Amendment.

Court membership
- Chief Justice Warren E. Burger Associate Justices Hugo Black · William O. Douglas; John M. Harlan II · William J. Brennan Jr. Potter Stewart · Byron White; Thurgood Marshall

Case opinions
- Majority: Burger, joined by Black, Harlan, Brennan, Stewart, White, Marshall
- Concurrence: Brennan
- Concurrence: Harlan (in judgment)
- Dissent: Douglas

Laws applied
- U.S. Const., Amends. I and XIV

Walz v. Tax Commission of the City of New York, 397 U.S. 664 (1970), was a case before the United States Supreme Court. The Court held that grants of tax exemption to religious organizations do not violate the Establishment Clause of the First Amendment. It was the first case to articulate the "excessive entanglement doctrine" that one year later became the third prong of the Lemon test.

== Background ==
=== Legislation ===
New York law granted property tax exemptions to religious organizations for religious properties used solely for religious worship.

- This exemption is authorized by N.Y. Const. art. XVI, § 1.

- Under this provision, exemptions from taxation may be granted only by general laws. Exemptions may be altered or repealed except those exempting real or personal property used exclusively for religious, educational or charitable purposes as defined by law and owned by any corporation or association organized or conducted exclusively for one or more of such purposes and not operating for profit.

- This exemption is implemented by N.Y. Real Prop. Tax Law § 420(1).

- This provision states in part: Real property owned by a corporation or association organized exclusively for the moral or mental improvement of men and women, or for religious, Bible, tract, charitable, benevolent, missionary, hospital, infirmary, educational, public playground, scientific, literary, bar association, medical society, library, patriotic, historical or cemetery purposes and used exclusively for carrying out thereupon one or more of such purposes shall be exempt from taxation as provided in this section.

=== Dispute ===
The plaintiff, Frederick Walz, an owner of real estate in Staten Island, New York, brought suit in the New York Supreme Court, Special Term, seeking to enjoin the New York City Tax Commission from granting these exemptions. Walz contended that the exemptions indirectly required him to make a contribution to religious bodies and thereby violated the religion clauses of the First Amendment.

=== Procedural history ===
Rejecting this contention, the New York Supreme Court granted the defendant's motion for summary judgment and dismissed the complaint. The Appellate Division of the Supreme Court and the New York Court of Appeals affirmed.

== Opinion of the court ==
The United States Supreme Court affirmed, in an opinion by Chief Justice Warren Burger, expressing the views of five members of the court.

=== Reasoning ===
The Court held that there was no nexus between these tax exemptions and the establishment of religion, and that federal or state grants of tax exemption to churches did not violate the First Amendment:

(1) exemptions were granted to all houses of religious worship within a broad class of property owned by nonprofit, quasi-public corporations which included hospitals, libraries, playgrounds, and scientific, professional, historical, and patriotic groups, and the legislative purpose was thus not aimed at establishing, sponsoring, or supporting religion, and
(2) the exemptions for religious organizations created only a minimal and remote involvement between church and state, and far less of an involvement than would be created by taxation of churches, and the effect of the exemptions was thus not an excessive government entanglement with religion. A tax exemption was not sponsorship of the organizations because the government did not transfer part of its revenue to churches but simply abstained from demanding that the churches support the state. The exemption created a more minimal and remote involvement between church and state than did taxation because it restricted the fiscal relationship between church and state and reinforced the desired separation insulating one from the other.

== Concurrences ==
Justices Brennan and Harlan, in separate opinions, while concurring in the Court's conclusion that the tax exemptions did not violate the First Amendment, each said they would reach this conclusion by applying different criteria from those the Court applied.

== Dissent ==
Justice Douglas would have held that the tax exemptions for religious organizations violated the Establishment Clause of the First Amendment.

== See also ==
- List of United States Supreme Court cases, volume 397
