= Endorsement test =

The endorsement test proposed by United States Supreme Court Justice Sandra Day O'Connor in the 1984 case of Lynch v. Donnelly asks whether a particular government action amounts to an endorsement of religion, thus violating the Establishment Clause of the First Amendment. According to the test, a government action is invalid if it creates a perception in the mind of a reasonable observer that the government is either endorsing or disapproving of religion.

O'Connor wrote:

The Establishment Clause prohibits government from making adherence to a religion relevant in any way to a person's standing in the political community. Government can run afoul of that prohibition…[by] endorsement or disapproval of religion. Endorsement sends a message to nonadherents that they are outsiders, not full members of the political community, and an accompanying message to adherents that they are insiders, favored members of the political community. [...] The proper inquiry under the purpose prong of Lemon, I submit, is whether the government intends to convey a message of endorsement or disapproval of religion.

O’Connor’s endorsement test has, on occasion, been subsumed into the Lemon test. In the Seventh Circuit Court of Appeals case Doe v. Elmbrook School District (2012) for example the Seventh Circuit, sitting en banc, decided by a vote of 7-3, that a school’s practice of holding graduation ceremonies in an evangelical church violated the First Amendment’s Establishment Clause. In this context the Seventh Circuit stated that “[t]he three-pronged test set forth by the Supreme Court in Lemon v. Kurtzman, 403 U. S. 602 (1971), remains the prevailing analytical tool for the analysis of Establishment Clause claims.”. It then explained that the endorsement test has become “a legitimate part of Lemon’s second prong.”

The endorsement test is often invoked in situations where the government is engaged in expressive activities, such as graduation prayers, religious signs on government property, or religion in the curriculum.

Pennsylvania Judge John E. Jones III cited the endorsement test in his 2005 decision in Kitzmiller v. Dover Area School District. In a case where the school board required biology teachers to read a statement to the students about intelligent design as an alternative explanation to evolution, he wrote "The proper application of both the endorsement and Lemon tests to the facts of this case makes it abundantly clear that the Board’s ID Policy violates the Establishment Clause."

Some scholars understand the endorsement test as an addition to standards outlined in Lemon, while others view it as a minimal formulation of Lemon, i.e., that while endorsement may not be the only thing that violates the purpose and effects prongs of the Lemon test, it is the first and most important evidence that such a violation has occurred.

The endorsement test was rejected as an "abandoned... offshoot" of the Lemon test in Kennedy v. Bremerton School District and is no longer applicable.

== See also ==
- Lemon v. Kurtzman
- With God, all things are possible
