= Lynch v. Donnelly =

- Supreme Court of the United States

Argued October 4, 1983 Decided March 5, 1984
- Full case name: Dennis M. Lynch, Mayor of Pawtucket, et al. v. Daniel Donnelly, et al.
- Citations: 465 U.S. 668 (more) 104 S. Ct. 1355; 79 L. Ed. 2d 604; 1984 U.S. LEXIS 37; 52 U.S.L.W. 4317

Holding
- The city of Pawtucket's nativity scene does not violate the Establishment Clause.

Court membership
- Chief Justice Warren E. Burger Associate Justices William J. Brennan Jr. · Byron White; Thurgood Marshall · Harry Blackmun; Lewis F. Powell Jr. · William Rehnquist; John P. Stevens · Sandra Day O'Connor

Case opinions
- Majority: Burger, joined by White, Powell, Rehnquist, O'Connor
- Concurrence: O'Connor
- Dissent: Brennan, joined by Marshall, Blackmun, Stevens
- Dissent: Blackmun, joined by Stevens

Laws applied
- U.S. Const. amend. I

Lynch v. Donnelly, 465 U.S. 668 (1984), was a United States Supreme Court case challenging the legality of Christmas decorations on town property. All plaintiffs, including lead plaintiff Daniel Donnelly, were members of the Rhode Island chapter of the ACLU. The lead defendant was Dennis Lynch, then mayor of Pawtucket, Rhode Island.

== Background ==
The annual Christmas display in the shopping district of Pawtucket was challenged in court. It included, among other decorations, a Santa Claus house, reindeer pulling Santa's sleigh, a Christmas tree, a banner reading "Season's Greetings", and a crèche. The crèche had been a part of the display since at least 1943. The plaintiffs brought the suit to the District Court of Rhode Island, which permanently enjoined the city from displaying the Nativity scene as a violation of the Establishment Clause of the First Amendment to the United States Constitution. The Court of Appeals for the First Circuit affirmed the district court's ruling. The city then petitioned to the U.S. Supreme Court, which granted certiorari.

== Ruling ==
Chief Justice Burger delivered the opinion of the Court, in which Justices White, Powell, Rehnquist, and O'Connor joined. The Supreme Court reversed previous rulings in a vote of 5–4, ruling that the display was not an effort to advocate a particular religious message and had "legitimate secular purposes." It held that the crèche did not violate the Establishment Clause based on the test created in Lemon v. Kurtzman (1971). They ruled that the crèche is a passive representation of religion and that there was "insufficient evidence to establish that the inclusion of the crèche is a purposeful or surreptitious effort to express some kind of subtle governmental advocacy of a particular religious" view. They also stated that the Constitution "affirmatively mandates accommodation, not merely tolerance of all religions, and forbids hostility toward any."

The Court ruled that the crèche has a legitimate secular purpose within a larger holiday display to celebrate the season and the origins of Christmas which has long been a part of Western culture. The Federal "Government has long recognized—indeed it has subsidized—holidays with religious significance." For example, the first Congress that passed the First Amendment enacted legislation providing for paid Chaplains in the House and Senate, and "It has long been the practice that federal employees are released from duties on Thanksgiving and Christmas while being paid." The court compared the crèche to the display of religious paintings in government funded museums. In addition, the crèche requires only minimal expenses for assembly and dismantling. The Court also stated, "no inquiry into potential political divisiveness is even called for" because the situation does not involve direct aid to church-sponsored organizations and because the crèche been displayed for 40 years with no problems.

== Concurrence ==
Justice O’Connor, in her concurring opinion, offered a "clarification" of how the Establishment Clause should be read:

The Establishment Clause prohibits government from making adherence to a religion relevant in any way to a person's standing in the political community. Government can run afoul of that prohibition in two principal ways. One is excessive entanglement with religious institutions, which may interfere with the independence of the institutions, give the institutions access to government or governmental powers not fully shared by nonadherents of the religion, and foster the creation of political constituencies defined along religious lines. E.g., Larkin v. Grendel's Den, Inc., 459 U. S. 116 (1982). The second and more direct infringement is government endorsement or disapproval of religion. Endorsement sends a message to nonadherents that they are outsiders, not full members of the political community, and an accompanying message to adherents that they are insiders, favored members of the political community. [...] The proper inquiry under the purpose prong of Lemon, I submit, is whether the government intends to convey a message of endorsement or disapproval of religion.

This is sometimes referred to as the "Endorsement test." A law which fails this test is found to be unconstitutional because it "endorses" religion or religious beliefs in such a way that it tells those who agree that they are favored insiders and those who disagree that they are disfavored outsiders. The other side of the coin would be the "disapproval" of religion or religious beliefs in such a way that those who agree with the beliefs are told that they are disfavored outsiders while those who disagree with the beliefs are told that they are favored insiders.

== Dissent ==
Justices Brennan, Marshall, Blackmun, and Stevens dissented. The dissenting opinion argued that the case did not pass the Lemon test. The secular display surrounding their secular purpose of celebrating of a national holiday could have been done without a clearly religious symbol that supports only one religion to the exclusion of others giving one group public approval of their views. Even if other religious groups are allowed to include "'competing efforts [by religious groups] to gain or maintain the support of government' may 'occasio[n] considerable civil strife.'" The religious crèche is also placed in a central location within the display, which makes even less of the Court's idea that Pawtucket was just including all of the traditional images. The dissenting opinion also mentions that it cannot be compared to a religious display in a museum because it is not solely being considered as a piece of art but as a religious symbol as well. The government recognition of Christmas previously has only been to recognize the secular parts of Christmas, such as spending time with family. The minority also dissented, noting that "Those who believe in the message of the nativity receive the unique and exclusive benefit of public recognition and approval of their views" and that the creche provides "a significant symbolic benefit to religion..." The dissent argued "The effect on minority religious groups, as well as on those who may reject religion, is to convey the message that their views are not similarly worthy of public recognition nor entitled to public support. It was precisely this sort of chauvinism that the Establishment Clause was intended forever to prohibit."

== See also ==
- Christmas controversies
- County of Allegheny v. American Civil Liberties Union (1989)
- Endorsement test
