= Lemon v. Kurtzman =

- Supreme Court of the United States

Argued March 3, 1971 Decided June 28, 1971
- Full case name: Alton T. Lemon, et al. v. David H. Kurtzman, Superintendent of Public Instruction of Pennsylvania, et al.; John R. Earley, et al. v. John DiCenso, et al.; William P. Robinson, Jr. v. John DiCenso, et al.
- Citations: 403 U.S. 602 (more) 91 S. Ct. 2105; 29 L. Ed. 2d 745; 1971 U.S. LEXIS 19

Case history
- Prior: Lemon v. Kurtzman, 310 F. Supp. 35 (E.D. Pa. 1969); probable jurisdiction noted, 397 U.S. 1034 (1970); DiCenso v. Robinson, 316 F. Supp. 112 (D.R.I. 1970); probable jurisdiction noted, consolidated, 400 U.S. 901 (1970).
- Subsequent: On remand to 348 F. Supp. 300 (E.D. Pa. 1972), affirmed, 411 U.S. 192 (1973)

Holding
- For a law to be considered constitutional under the Establishment Clause of the First Amendment, the law must (1) have a legitimate secular purpose, (2) not have the primary effect of either advancing or inhibiting religion and (3) not result in an excessive entanglement of government and religion.

Court membership
- Chief Justice Warren E. Burger Associate Justices Hugo Black · William O. Douglas; John M. Harlan II · William J. Brennan Jr. Potter Stewart · Byron White; Thurgood Marshall · Harry Blackmun

Case opinions
- Majority: Burger, joined by Black, Douglas, Harlan, Stewart, Marshall, Blackmun
- Concurrence: Douglas, joined by Black, Marshall (who filed a separate statement)
- Concurrence: Brennan
- Concur/dissent: White

Laws applied
- U.S. Const. amend. I; R.I. Gen. Laws Ann. 16-51-1 et seq. (Supp. 1970); Pa. Stat. Ann. tit. 24, §§ 5601-5609 (Supp. 1971)
- Abrogated by
- Kennedy v. Bremerton School District (2022)

Lemon v. Kurtzman, 403 U.S. 602 (1971), was a case argued before the United States Supreme Court. The court ruled in an 8–0 decision that Pennsylvania's Nonpublic Elementary and Secondary Education Act (represented through David Kurtzman) from 1968 was unconstitutional and in an 8–1 decision that Rhode Island's 1969 Salary Supplement Act was unconstitutional, violating the Establishment Clause of the First Amendment. The act had allowed the Superintendent of Public Schools to reimburse private schools (mostly Catholic) for the salaries of teachers who taught in these private elementary schools from public textbooks and with public instructional materials.

== Lemon test ==
The Court applied a three-prong test, which became known as the Lemon test (named after the lead plaintiff Alton Lemon), to decide whether the state statutes violated the Establishment Clause.

The Court held that the Establishment Clause required that a statute satisfy all parts of a three-prong test:

- The "Purpose Prong": The statute must have a secular legislative purpose.
- The "Effect Prong": The principal or primary effect of the statute must neither advance nor inhibit religion.
- The "Entanglement Prong": The statute must not result in an "excessive government entanglement" with religion.

In the 1985 case Wallace v. Jaffree, the Supreme Court stated that the effect prong and the entanglement prong need not be examined if the law in question had no obvious secular purpose. In Corporation of Presiding Bishop of Church of Jesus Christ of Latter-day Saints v. Amos (1987) the Supreme Court wrote that the purpose prong's requirement of a secular legislative purpose did not mean that a law's purpose must be unrelated to religion, because this would amount to a requirement, in the words of Zorach v. Clauson, 343 U. S. 306 (1952), at 314, "that the government show a callous indifference to religious groups." Instead, "Lemon's 'purpose' requirement aims at preventing the relevant governmental decisionmaker—in this case, Congress—from abandoning neutrality and acting with the intent of promoting a particular point of view in religious matters." The Supreme Court further explained in McCreary County v. American Civil Liberties Union (2005) that "When the government acts with the ostensible and predominant purpose of advancing religion, it violates that central Establishment Clause value of official religious neutrality, there being no neutrality when the government’s ostensible object is to take sides."

The act at issue in Lemon stipulated that "eligible teachers must teach only courses offered in the public schools, using only materials used in the public schools, and must agree not to teach courses in religion." Still, a three-judge panel found 25% of the State's elementary students attended private schools, about 95% of those attended Roman Catholic schools, and the sole beneficiaries under the act were 250 teachers at Roman Catholic schools.

The Court found that the parochial school system was "an integral part of the religious mission of the Catholic Church", and held that the Act fostered "excessive entanglement" between government and religion, thus violating the Establishment Clause.

Held: Both statutes are unconstitutional under the Religion Clauses of the First Amendment, as the cumulative impact of the entire relationship arising under the statutes involves excessive entanglement between government and religion.

=== Agostini v. Felton modification ===
The Lemon test was modified, according to the First Amendment Center, in the 1997 case Agostini v. Felton in which the U.S. Supreme Court combined the effect prong and the entanglement prong. This resulted in an unchanged purpose prong and a modified effect prong. As the First Amendment Center notes, "The Court in Agostini identified three primary criteria for determining whether a government action has a primary effect of advancing religion: 1) government indoctrination, 2) defining the recipients of government benefits based on religion, and 3) excessive entanglement between government and religion."

== Later use ==
Conservative justices, such as Clarence Thomas and Antonin Scalia, have criticized the application of the Lemon test. Justice Scalia compared the test to a "ghoul in a late night horror movie" in Lamb's Chapel v. Center Moriches Union Free School District (1993).

The Supreme Court has applied the Lemon test in Santa Fe Independent School Dist. v. Doe (2000), while in McCreary County v. American Civil Liberties Union (2005) the court did not overturn the Lemon test, even though it was urged to do so by the petitioner.

The test was also central to Kitzmiller v. Dover, a 2005 intelligent design case before the United States District Court for the Middle District of Pennsylvania.

The Fourth Circuit Court of Appeals applied the test in Int'l Refugee Assistance Project v. Trump (2017) upholding a preliminary injunction against President Donald Trump's executive order banning immigration from certain majority-Muslim countries.

In concurring opinions in The American Legion v. American Humanist Association (2019), some of the Court's more conservative justices heavily criticized the Lemon test. Justice Samuel Alito stated that the Lemon test had "shortcomings" and that "as Establishment Clause cases involving a great array of laws and practices came to the Court, it became more and more apparent that the Lemon test could not resolve them." Justice Brett Kavanaugh noted that the Court "no longer applies the old test articulated in Lemon v. Kurtzman" and said that "the Court’s decisions over the span of several decades demonstrate that the Lemon test is not good law and does not apply to Establishment Clause cases." Although the Court did not overrule Lemon v. Kurtzman in American Legion v. American Humanist Association, Justice Thomas stated that he "would take the logical next step and overrule the Lemon test in all contexts" because "the Lemon test is not good law." Additionally, Justice Neil Gorsuch called Lemon v. Kurtzman a "misadventure" and claimed that it has now been "shelved" by the Court. Justice Elena Kagan, however, defended the Lemon test, stating that "although I agree that rigid application of the Lemon test does not solve every Establishment Clause problem, I think that test's focus on purposes and effects is crucial in evaluating government action in this sphere—as this very suit shows."

In Kennedy v. Bremerton School District (2022), Neil Gorsuch's majority opinion did not explicitly overturn Lemon, but instructed lower courts to disregard Lemon in favor of a new standard for evaluating religious actions in a public school. In Groff v. DeJoy, 600 U.S. 447 (2023), in an opinion for a unanimous Court, Justice Alito described Lemon v. Kurtzman, and thus the Lemon test, as "now abrogated".

== See also ==
- List of United States Supreme Court cases, volume 403
- Sherbert Test
- Endorsement test
- Lee v. Weisman (1992)
- Kitzmiller v. Dover Area School District (M.D. Pa. 2005)
- Summers v. Adams (D.S.C. 2009)
- Larson v. Valente (1982)
