= Establishment Clause =

Prohibits the U.S. Congress from establishing an official religion

In American law, the Establishment Clause of the First Amendment to the United States Constitution, together with that Amendment's Free Exercise Clause, form the constitutional right of freedom of religion. The Establishment Clause and the Free Exercise Clause together read:

Congress shall make no law respecting an establishment of religion, or prohibiting the free exercise thereof...

The Establishment Clause acts as a double security, prohibiting both control of the government by religion and political control of religion by the government. By it, the federal government of the United States and, by later extension, the governments of all U.S. states and U.S. territories, are prohibited from establishing or sponsoring religion.

The clause was based on a number of precedents, including the Constitutions of Clarendon, the Bill of Rights 1689, and the first constitutions of Pennsylvania and New Jersey. An initial draft by John Dickinson was prepared in conjunction with his drafting the Articles of Confederation. In 1789, then-congressman James Madison prepared another draft which, after discussion and debate in the First Congress, would become part of the text of the First Amendment of the Bill of Rights. The Establishment Clause is complemented by the Free Exercise Clause, which prohibits government interference with religious belief and, within limits, religious practice.

The Establishment Clause is a limitation placed upon the United States Congress preventing it from passing legislation establishing an official religion and, by interpretation, makes it illegal for the government to promote theocracy or promote a specific religion with taxes. The Free Exercise Clause prohibits the government from preventing the free exercise of religion. While the Establishment Clause prohibits Congress from preferring one religion over another, it does not prohibit the government's involvement with religion to make accommodations for religious observances and practices in order to achieve the purposes of the Free Exercise Clause.

== Historical background ==
=== Constitutions of Clarendon ===
The Constitutions of Clarendon, a 12th-century English law, had prohibited criminal defendants' using religious laws (at that time, in medieval England, canon law of the Catholic Church) to seek exemption from criminal prosecution.

=== 1689 Bill of Rights ===
The 1689 English Bill of Rights secured the rights of all "persons" to be free from establishment of Roman Catholic laws in the government of England.

=== Colonial New Jersey and Pennsylvania Constitutions ===
The original Mason–Dixon line was the demarcation line between the Catholic colony of Maryland and the New Jersey and Pennsylvania colonies, which followed the 1689 Bill of Rights and their own colonial constitutions which provided similar protections against the establishment of Catholic laws in government.

=== Virginia Statute for Religious Freedom ===
A possible additional precursor of the Free Exercise Clause was the Virginia Statute for Religious Freedom. The statute was drafted by Thomas Jefferson in 1777 and was introduced in the Virginia General Assembly in 1779. It did not pass the General Assembly until 1786. James Madison played an important role in its passage. The statute disestablished the Church of England in Virginia and guaranteed freedom of religion exercise to men of all religious faiths, including Catholics and Jews as well as members of all Protestant denominations.

=== United States Bill of Rights ===
The First Amendment is part of a group of 10 Amendments to the United States Constitution known as the Bill of Rights. The idea of adding a Bill of Rights to the Constitution was proposed by George Mason five days before the conclusion of the Constitutional Convention held in Philadelphia in 1787. His proposal was rejected by the other delegates. Alexander Hamilton later argued in The Federalist Papers that a Bill of Rights was unnecessary, claiming that since the Constitution granted limited powers to the federal government, it did not grant the new government the power to abuse the rights that would be secured by a Bill of Rights. Nevertheless, the supporters of the Constitution (known as Federalists) in order to secure its ratification in Massachusetts, agreed to add a group of amendments to the Constitution after its ratification that would serve as a Bill of Rights. Later, six more states likewise recommended the addition of a Bill of Rights, and the idea was also endorsed by Jefferson and Madison. When the First Federal Congress met in 1789, Madison implemented the idea by introducing 17 Amendments to the Constitution. By December 1791, ten of his Amendments were ratified by the necessary three quarters of the states, and they became part of the US Constitution, thereafter becoming known as "the Bill of Rights".

=== Concerns of Virginia Baptists ===
The Establishment Clause addressed the concerns of members of minority faiths who did not want the federal government to establish a state religion for the entire nation. The Baptists in Virginia, for example, had suffered discrimination prior to the state's disestablishment of the Anglican church in 1786. As Virginia prepared to hold its elections to the state ratifying convention in 1788, the Baptists were concerned that the Constitution had no safeguard against the creation of a new national church. In Orange County, Virginia, two federalist candidates, James Madison and James Gordon Jr., were running against two anti-federalists (opponents of the Constitution), Thomas Barbour and Charles Porter. Barbour requested to John Leland, an influential Baptist preacher and fervent lifelong proponent of religious liberty, that he write a letter to Barbour outlining his objections to the proposed Constitution. Leland stated in the letter that, among his other concerns, the Constitution had no Bill of Rights and no safeguards for religious liberty and freedom of the press. A number of historians have concluded on the basis of compelling circumstantial evidence that, just prior to the election in March 1788, Madison met with Leland and gained his support of ratification by addressing these concerns and providing him with the necessary reassurances. In any event, Leland cast his vote for Madison. Leland's support, according to Scarberry, was likely important to the overwhelming victory of Madison and Gordon.

== Incorporation ==
Prior to the enactment of the Fourteenth Amendment to the United States Constitution in 1868, the Supreme Court generally held that the substantive protections of the Bill of Rights did not apply to state governments. Subsequently, by the Incorporation doctrine, the Bill of Rights has been broadly applied to limit state and local government as well. The process of incorporating the two Religion Clauses in the First Amendment was twofold. The first step was the Supreme Court's conclusion in 1940 that the Free Exercise Clause was made applicable to the states through the Fourteenth Amendment. Conceptually, this raised few difficulties: the Due Process Clause protects those rights in the Bill of Rights "implicit in the concept of ordered liberty," and free exercise of religion is a quintessential individual right (and had been recognized as such at the state level from the beginning).

Incorporation of the Establishment Clause in 1947 proved to be problematic in several ways and subject to criticism. The controversy concerning its incorporation results primarily from the fact that one of the intentions of the Establishment Clause was to prevent Congress from interfering with state establishments of religion that existed at the time of the founding (at least six states had established religions at the founding) – a fact conceded by even those members of the Court who believe the Establishment Clause was made applicable to the states through incorporation. Critics, such as Clarence Thomas, have also argued that the Due Process Clause of the Fourteenth Amendment is understood to incorporate only individual rights found in the Bill of Rights; the Establishment Clause, unlike the Free Exercise Clause (which critics readily concede protects individual rights), does not purport to protect individual rights.

== Financial assistance ==
Prior to American independence, most of the original colonies supported religious activities with taxes, with several colonies choosing a single church as its official religion. These official churches enjoyed privileges not granted to other religious groups. Massachusetts and Connecticut supported the Congregational church by taxes. In colonial South Carolina, the Anglican Church benefited from church taxes. Other colonies would more generally assist religion by requiring taxes that would partially fund religious institutions - taxpayers could direct payments to the Protestant denomination of their choosing. Only the colonies of Delaware, New Jersey, Pennsylvania and Rhode Island did not require a tax to support religion. During and after the American Revolution, religious minorities, such as the Methodists and the Baptists, argued that taxes to support religion violated freedoms won from the British. Defenders of the practice argued that government needed to fund religious institutions because public virtue depended on these institutions which could not survive purely on private donations.

The Supreme Court first considered the question of financial assistance to religious organizations in Bradfield v. Roberts (1899). The federal government had funded a hospital operated by a Roman Catholic institution. In that case, the Court ruled that the funding was to a secular organization – the hospital – and was therefore permissible.

During the twentieth century, the Supreme Court more closely scrutinized government activity involving religious institutions. In Everson v. Board of Education (1947), the Supreme Court upheld a New Jersey statute funding student transportation to schools, whether parochial or not. Justice Hugo Black held,

The "establishment of religion" clause of the First Amendment means at least this: Neither a state nor the federal government can set up a church. Neither can pass laws which aid one religion, aid all religions, or prefer one religion over another. Neither can force nor influence a person to go to or to remain away from church against his will or force him to profess a belief or disbelief in any religion. No person can be punished for entertaining or professing religious beliefs or disbeliefs, for church attendance or non-attendance. No tax in any amount, large or small, can be levied to support any religious activities or institutions, whatever they may be called, or whatever form they may adopt to teach or practice religion. Neither a state nor the Federal Government can, openly or secretly, participate in the affairs of any religious organizations or groups and vice versa. In the words of Jefferson, the clause against establishment of religion by law was intended to erect "a wall of separation between church and State."

The New Jersey law was upheld, for it applied "to all its citizens without regard to their religious belief". After Everson, lawsuits in several states sought to disentangle public monies from religious teaching, the leading case being the 1951 Dixon School Case of New Mexico.

The Jefferson quotation cited in Black's opinion is from a letter Jefferson wrote in 1802 to the Baptists of Danbury, Connecticut, that there should be "a wall of separation between church and state." Critics of Black's reasoning (most notably, former Chief Justice William H. Rehnquist) have argued that the majority of states did have "official" churches at the time of the First Amendment's adoption and that James Madison, not Jefferson, was the principal drafter. However, Madison himself often wrote of "perfect separation between the ecclesiastical and civil matters" (1822 letter to Livingston), which means the authority of the church (that which comes from the church) is decided by church authority, and that which is decided in civil government is decided by civil authorities; neither may decree law or policy in each other's realm. Another description reads: "line of separation between the rights of religion and the civil authority... entire abstinence of the government" (1832 letter Rev. Adams), and "practical distinction between Religion and Civil Government as essential to the purity of both, and as guaranteed by the Constitution of the United States" (1811 letter to Baptist Churches).

In Lemon v. Kurtzman (1971), the Supreme Court ruled that government may not "excessively entangle" with religion. The case involved two Pennsylvania laws: one permitting the state to "purchase" services in secular fields from religious schools, and the other permitting the state to pay a percentage of the salaries of private school teachers, including teachers in religious institutions. The Supreme Court found that the government was "excessively entangled" with religion, and invalidated the statutes in question. The excessive entanglement test, together with the secular purpose and primary effect tests thereafter became known as the Lemon test, which judges have often used to test the constitutionality of a statute on establishment clause grounds.

The Supreme Court decided Committee for Public Education & Religious Liberty v. Nyquist and Sloan v. Lemon in 1973. In both cases, states—New York and Pennsylvania—had enacted laws whereby public tax revenues would be paid to low-income parents so as to permit them to send students to private schools. It was held that in both cases, the state unconstitutionally provided aid to religious organizations. The ruling was partially reversed in Mueller v. Allen (1983). There, the Court upheld a Minnesota statute permitting the use of tax revenues to reimburse parents of students. The Court noted that the Minnesota statute granted such aid to parents of all students, whether they attended public or private schools.

While the Court has prevented states from directly funding parochial schools, it has not stopped them from aiding religious colleges and universities. In Tilton v. Richardson (1971), the Court permitted the use of public funds for the construction of facilities in religious institutions of higher learning. It was found that there was no "excessive entanglement" since the buildings were themselves not religious, unlike teachers in parochial schools, and because the aid came in the form of a one-time grant, rather than continuous assistance. One of the largest recent controversies over the amendment centered on school vouchers—government aid for students to attend private and predominantly religious schools. The Supreme Court, in Zelman v. Simmons-Harris (2002), upheld the constitutionality of private school vouchers, turning away an Establishment Clause challenge.

== State-sanctioned prayer in public schools ==
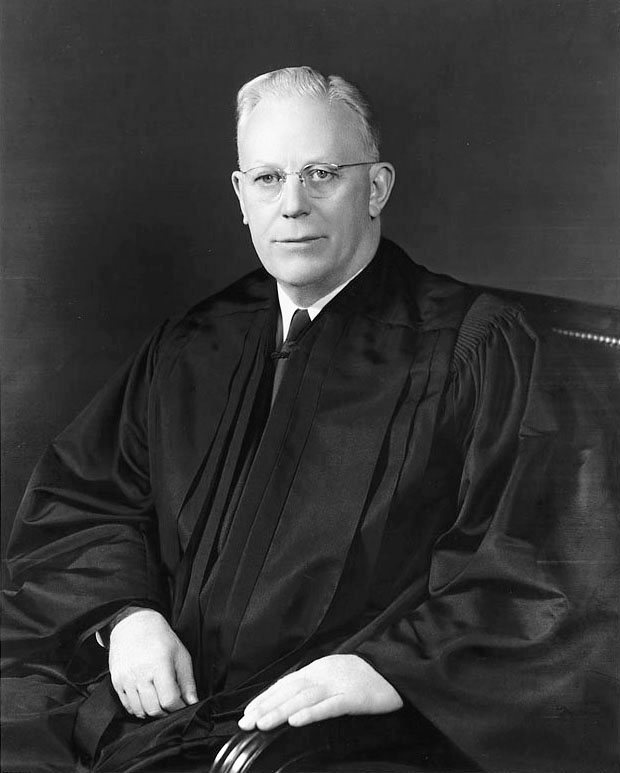
Earl Warren was Chief Justice when Engel v. Vitale was decided.

Further important decisions came in the 1960s, during the Warren Court era. One of the Court's most controversial decisions came in Engel v. Vitale in 1962. The case involved the mandatory daily recitation by public school officials of a prayer written by the New York Board of Regents, which read "Almighty God, we acknowledge our dependence upon Thee, and we beg Thy blessings upon us, our parents, our teachers and our Country". The Supreme Court deemed it unconstitutional and struck it down, with Justice Black writing "it is no part of the official business of government to compose official prayers for any group of American people to recite as part of a religious program carried out by the Government." The reading of the Lord's Prayer or of the Bible in the classroom of a public school by the teacher was ruled unconstitutional in 1963. The ruling did not apply to parochial or private schools in general. The decision has been met with both criticism and praise. Many social conservatives are critical of the court's reasoning, including the late Chief Justice William H. Rehnquist. Conversely, the ACLU and other civil libertarian groups hailed the court's decision.

In Abington Township v. Schempp (1963), the case involving the mandatory reading of the Lord's Prayer in class, the Supreme Court introduced the "secular purpose" and "primary effect" tests, which were to be used to determine compatibility with the establishment clause. Essentially, the law in question must have a valid secular purpose, and its primary effect must not be to promote or inhibit a particular religion. Since the law requiring the recital of the Lord's Prayer violated these tests, it was struck down. The "excessive entanglement" test was added in Lemon v. Kurtzman (vide supra).

In Wallace v. Jaffree (1985), the Supreme Court struck down an Alabama law whereby students in public schools would observe daily a period of silence for the purpose of private prayer. The Court did not, however, find that the moment of silence was itself unconstitutional. Rather, it ruled that Alabama lawmakers had passed the statute solely to advance religion, thereby violating the secular purpose test.

The 1990s were marked by controversies surrounding religion's role in public affairs. In Lee v. Weisman (1992), the Supreme Court ruled unconstitutional the offering of prayers by religious officials before voluntarily attending ceremonies such as graduation. Thus, the Court established that the state could not conduct religious exercises at public occasions even if attendance was not strictly compulsory. In Lee the Court developed the coercion test. Under this test the government does not violate the establishment clause unless it (1) provides direct aid to religion in a way that would tend to establish a state church, or (2) coerces people to support or participate in religion against their will. In Santa Fe Independent School Dist. v. Doe (2000), the Court ruled that a vote of the student body could not authorize student-led prayer prior to school events.

In 2002, controversy centered on a ruling by the Court of Appeals for the Ninth Circuit in Elk Grove Unified School District v. Newdow (2002), which struck down a California law providing for the recitation of the Pledge of Allegiance (which includes the phrase "under God") in classrooms. Each House of Congress passed resolutions reaffirming their support for the pledge; the Senate vote was 99–0 and the House vote was 416–3. The Supreme Court heard arguments on the case, but did not rule on the merits, instead reversing the Ninth Circuit's decision on standing grounds.

== Religious displays ==
The inclusion of religious symbols in public holiday displays came before the Supreme Court in Lynch v. Donnelly (1984), and again in Allegheny County v. Greater Pittsburgh ACLU (1989). In the former case, the Court upheld the public display of a crèche, ruling that any benefit to religion was "indirect, remote, and incidental." In Allegheny County, however, the Court struck down a crèche display, which occupied a prominent position in the county courthouse and bore the words Gloria in Excelsis Deo, the words sung by the angels at the Nativity (Luke 2:14 in the Latin Vulgate translation). At the same time, the Allegheny County Court upheld the display of a nearby menorah, which appeared along with a Christmas tree and a sign saluting liberty, reasoning that "the combined display of the tree, the sign, and the menorah ... simply recognizes that both Christmas and Hanukkah are part of the same winter-holiday season, which has attained a secular status in our society." In Lynch v. Donnelly the Supreme Court also developed with the endorsement test a further test to determine the constitutionality under the Establishment Clause of certain government actions.

In 2001, Roy Moore, then Chief Justice of Alabama, installed a monument to the Ten Commandments in the state judicial building. In 2003, he was ordered in the case of Glassroth v. Moore by a federal judge to remove the monument, but he refused to comply, ultimately leading to his removal from office. The Supreme Court refused to hear the case, allowing the lower court's decision to stand.

On March 2, 2005, the Supreme Court heard arguments for two cases involving religious displays, Van Orden v. Perry and McCreary County v. ACLU of Kentucky. These were the first cases directly dealing with display of the Ten Commandments the Court had heard since Stone v. Graham (1980). These cases were decided on June 27, 2005. In Van Orden, the Court upheld, by a 5–4 vote, the legality of a Ten Commandments display at the Texas State Capitol due to the monument's "secular purpose". In McCreary County, however, the Court ruled 5–4 that displays of the Ten Commandments in several Kentucky county courthouses were unconstitutional because they were not clearly integrated with a secular display, and thus were considered to have a religious purpose.

== Blue laws ==
In the 1964 case McGowan v. Maryland, the Supreme Court held that blue laws which restricted the sale of goods on Sundays (and were originally intended to increase Church attendance) did not violate the Establishment Clause because they served a present secular purpose of providing a uniform day of rest for everyone.

== Establishment Clause for the states dispute ==
A 2013 YouGov poll found that 34% of Americans would favor establishing Christianity as the official state religion in their own state, 47% would be opposed and 19% were undecided. Clarence Thomas, Justice of the Supreme Court of the United States, has opined that the Establishment Clause does not apply to the states. If held as a majority opinion, this would confirm the right of individual states to establish a state religion.

In 2013, North Carolina state legislators proposed a bill that could have seen North Carolina establish an official religion for the state. The proposed bill was not enacted into state law.

== See also ==
- Faith-based initiatives
- Lassonde v. Pleasanton Unified School District
- No Religious Test Clause
- Section 116 of the Constitution of Australia
- Separation of church and state in the United States
- Torcaso v. Watkins
- United States religious history

== Research resources ==
- First Amendment Library entry for Establishment Clause Cases (with links to all of the Supreme Court's Establishment Clause cases)
- Defending Jefferson's "wall of separation" metaphor
- Religious Expression in American Public Life: A Joint Statement of Current Law
