= Freethought Day =

Freethought Day is October 12, the annual observance by freethinkers and secularists of the anniversary of the effective end of the Salem Witch Trials.

== History ==
The seminal event connected to Freethought Day is a letter written by then Massachusetts Governor William Phips in which he wrote to the Privy Council of the British monarchs, William and Mary, on this day in 1692. In this correspondence he outlined the quagmire that the trials had degenerated into, in part by a reliance on "evidence" of a non-objective nature and especially "spectral evidence" in which the accusers claimed to see devils and other phantasms consorting with the accused. Note that, contrary to what has been claimed by some, there was no specific order or edict by Phips to ban "spectral evidence" from all legal proceedings. Rather, this was one concern that brought about Phips' stopping the proceedings. When the trials ultimately resumed, "spectral evidence" was allowed but was largely discounted and those convicted were swiftly pardoned by Phips. In the time leading up to the trials being stopped, it was actually clerics including the famous Cotton Mather, often portrayed as the chief villain in the hysteria, who took the lead in advising cautions against the use of "spectral evidence." The Rev. Increase Mather, Cotton's father, specifically condemned "spectral evidence" in his book Cases of Conscience Concerning Evil Spirits, in which he stated that, "It were better that ten suspected witches should escape, than that one Innocent Person should be Condemned." It was this shift in sentiment, no doubt aided by the escalating hysteria and the fact that accusations were beginning to reach higher into the Massachusetts Bay Colony hierarchy, that led to Phips' action.

== Observations ==
Freethought Week is often observed during the week in which October 12 falls or Freethought Month during October. Organizers of these events are hoping to show the public that atheists are just like everyone else, that they are involved in the community and family-friendly.

=== Sacramento Freethought Event ===
Since 2002, Freethought Day has been observed in Sacramento as a free event, open to the public and held outdoors. Dubbed a "festival of reason" the annual event often features live entertainment and speakers similar to a rally, and is funded through a dinner or reception. "(Freethought Day) is really all about the celebration of the separation of church and state. We also celebrate the First Amendment, and science, and reason and progress" according to the event's organizer, David Diskin.

California Freethought Day Pansy logo

The 2007 event held at Waterfront Park started with a reading of the Phipps letter. Bands, speakers, bounce house and more, “It’s just a chance for us to show people we don’t have horns and tails” Mayor Heather Fargo issued a proclamation for Freethought Day in Sacramento.

In 2016, the event was renamed "California Freethought Day" to reflect the growth of the event spanning the last 15 years. Several hundred attended in 2016, with the theme "#SecularPride". Diskin, quoted in the Sacramento Bee, said that this is a day for people to meet others and '"work together to move society forward with a firm reliance on reason and humanity.'"

==== California Freethought Days ====
Highlights of past events.

| Year | Program | Speakers and Entertainers | Venue | Inductees | Notes |
|---|---|---|---|---|---|
| 2002 | Delight in Freethinking! | Bobbie Kirkhart, Henda Lea, Mynga Futrell, Jerry Sloan, Hank Kocol, Paul Geisert, Cleo Kocol, Ron Fegley, Kevin Schultz | Waterfront Park | Thomas Paine, James Madison, Frances Wright, Elizabeth Cady Stanton, Matilda Joslyn Gage, Thomas Jefferson, Robert Green Ingersoll, Mark Twain, and Clarence Darrow. | 30 people attended |
| 2003 | Liberty of Conscience | (emcee) Mynga Futrell, poetry readings by Cleo Kocol and Anatole Lubavich, Jerry Sloah, Paul Geisert | | William Phips and Denis Diderot | Literature tables, live music, and raffle. Volunteers gave mini-speeches. |
| 2004 | Dare to Think for yourself! | The James Israel Band Michael Newdow, Roberta Chevrette | | Ernestine Rose and Emma Goldman | Banned Book display, various other tables |
| 2005 | Stand Up for Reason | (emcee) Mel Lipman, Karen Scott, Pearcys, Mynga Futrell, James Israel Band, Roberta Chevrette, Joel Pelletier | | Mary Wollstonecraft and Frederick Douglass | Camp Quest presented and A Freethinker's Bookshelf |
| 2006 | Embrace Reality | (emcee) Mel Lipman, Michael Newdow, James Israel, roberta Chevrette | | Butterfly McQueen | Jump house from Camp Quest, blood pressure health check added, follil display |
| 2007 | Reason & Act... Boldly | Stephen Meadows, Paul Geisert, Michael Newdow, Karen Scott, Mynga Futrell, James Israel | | Roger Williams | Segway display |
| 2008 | Celebrate Our Secular Heritage! | (emcee) Lori Lipman Brown, Constantine Lobos, Paul Geisert, Kristi Craven, Keith Lowell Jensen, Matt LaClair, Vince Wales, Michael Newdow, Paul Martin, Jammin' James & Friends | | George Orwell | Freethought and banned book displays |
| 2009 | Stay Curious! | John Ross, Cleo Kocol, Brian Jones, Midtown Jazz, James Israel Band, Michael Newdow | César Chavez Park | Luther Burbank | |
| 2010 | Equality for Everyone! | (emcee) Marie Bain, Bruce Maiman, Roberta Chevrette, James Israel Band | | Jane Addams | City of Sacramento and Governor issued proclamations for Freethought Day. |
| 2011 | Come Out and Celebrate Reason! | Fred Edwards, Elisabeth Cornwell, Keith Lowell Jensen, The Phenomenauts, Dan Barker | McGeorge School of Law | <none> | 350 attendees. First movie screening. Multiple tracks throughout the day, including a "Leadership" track. |
| 2012 | Vote for Reason! | Michael Werner, Mikey Weinstein, Jessica Ahlquist, Chris Lombardi, A.J. Johnson, Rebecca Hensler, Steve Newton, Brian Dalton, Baba Brinkman, Victor Harris. | Ben Ali Shrine Center | Bayard Rustin | Addition of "Authors' Panel". |
| 2013 | The Many Voices of Reason | Sean Faircloth, Annie Laurie Gaylor, Greta Christina, Jason Frye, Heina Dadabhoy, Keith Lowell Jensen, Shelly Segal, Neil Wehneman | William Land Park | Hypatia | "Authors' Panel" expanded to include Podcasters. First "Group Photo". |
| 2014 | The Wonders of Magic and Reason | Ryan Kane, Rebecca Watson, Phil Zuckerman, Dan Arel, Ross Blocher | California State Capitol Building | Frank Zappa | |
| 2015 | Spread the Reason | Mandisa Thomas, Greta Christina, Jason Torpy, Jason Heap, Chris Johnson, Richard Carrier | California State Capitol Building | Oliver Sacks | "Leadership Day" resumed. Event started with a service from Sunday Assembly Sacramento. "Community Panel" added. |
| 2016 | #SecularPride | Aron Ra, David Silverman, Cidney Fisk, Nas Ishmael, Shelly Segal, Dan Arel, Melissa Pugh, Tom Manger, David McAfee, Steve Hill, Victor Harris | Vacant office space near Reason Center | Cleo Kocol and Anne Gaylor. | Heavy rain forced the event to an alternate, indoor venue. Several hundred attended. |
| 2017 | Engage with Reason | Ryan Bell, Evan Davids, Larry Decker, David Diskin, David Fitzgerald, Candace Gorham, Victor Harris, Rebecca Hensler, Sikivu Hutchinson, Juan Mendez, Richard Pan, Athena Salman, David Smalley, Thomas Smith, Elbe Spurling, David Tamayo, Jessica Xiao | California State Capitol Building | Katharine Hepburn | |
| 2018 | Discover Reason | Eugenie Scott, Dr. Abby Hafer, Kavin Senapathy, Seráh Blain, Evan Clark, Steve Hill | California State Capitol Building | W.E.B. Du Bois and Stephen Hawking | |
| 2019 | Think Again | Hemant Mehta, Raul Martinez, Debbie Goddard, Sarah Gillooly, Monica Miller | California State Capitol Building | Marie Curie and James Baldwin | |
| 2020 | Reason in the Voting Booth | Kavin Senapathy, David Diskin, Zoe Lofgren, Shelley Segal, Sean Omar Rivera, Seth Andrews, Thomas Westbrook, Erin Louis, Juhem Navarro-Rivera, Evan Clark, Arlene Ríos | Livestreamed | Nella Larsen and Susan B. Anthony | |
| 2021 | A Brighter Future with Reason | Ian Harris, Yvette d'Entremont, Sarah Levin, and Debra Olson. Scarlett Rabe, Joey Fabian, Ron Swallow, and Abraham Mackey. Thomas Smith, Ross Blocher, Carrie Poppy, and Cheryl Abram. | Livestreamed | Paul Geisert and James Randi | |
| 2022 | Question? - Think - Vote! | Emery Emery, Kevon Cameron, Chalice Blythe, Nancy Brink, Nadya Dutchin, Thomas Smith, David McAfee, Elbe Spurling, Judy Saint, Alexis Record, Nancy Gonzalez, Brad Buchanan, Sean O'Brien, Eugenie Scott, Susan Gerbic, Voices of Reason, Abraham Mackey | California State Capitol Building and Livestreamed | Ruth Bader Ginsburg, Zora Neale Hurston, Vashti McCollum, and Avijit Roy | |
| 2023 | Science is Golden | Darrel Ray, Jen Young, Trace Dominguez, Ryan Bell, Abraham Mackey | California State Capitol Building and Livestreamed | Sally Ride and Octavia E. Butler | |
| 2024 | Democracy not Theocracy | Rob Boston, Fish Stark, Jason Torpy, Anthony Pinn | California State Capitol Building and Livestreamed | | |

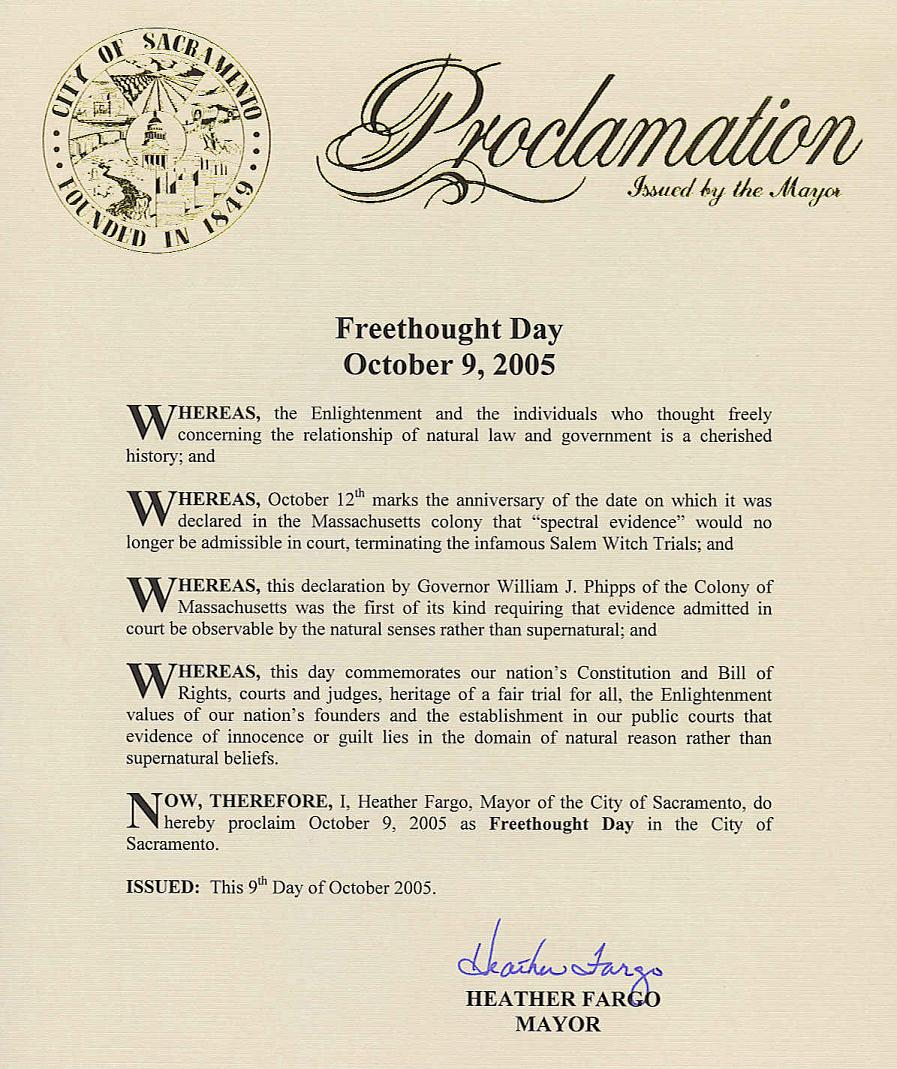
Freethought Day Proclamation

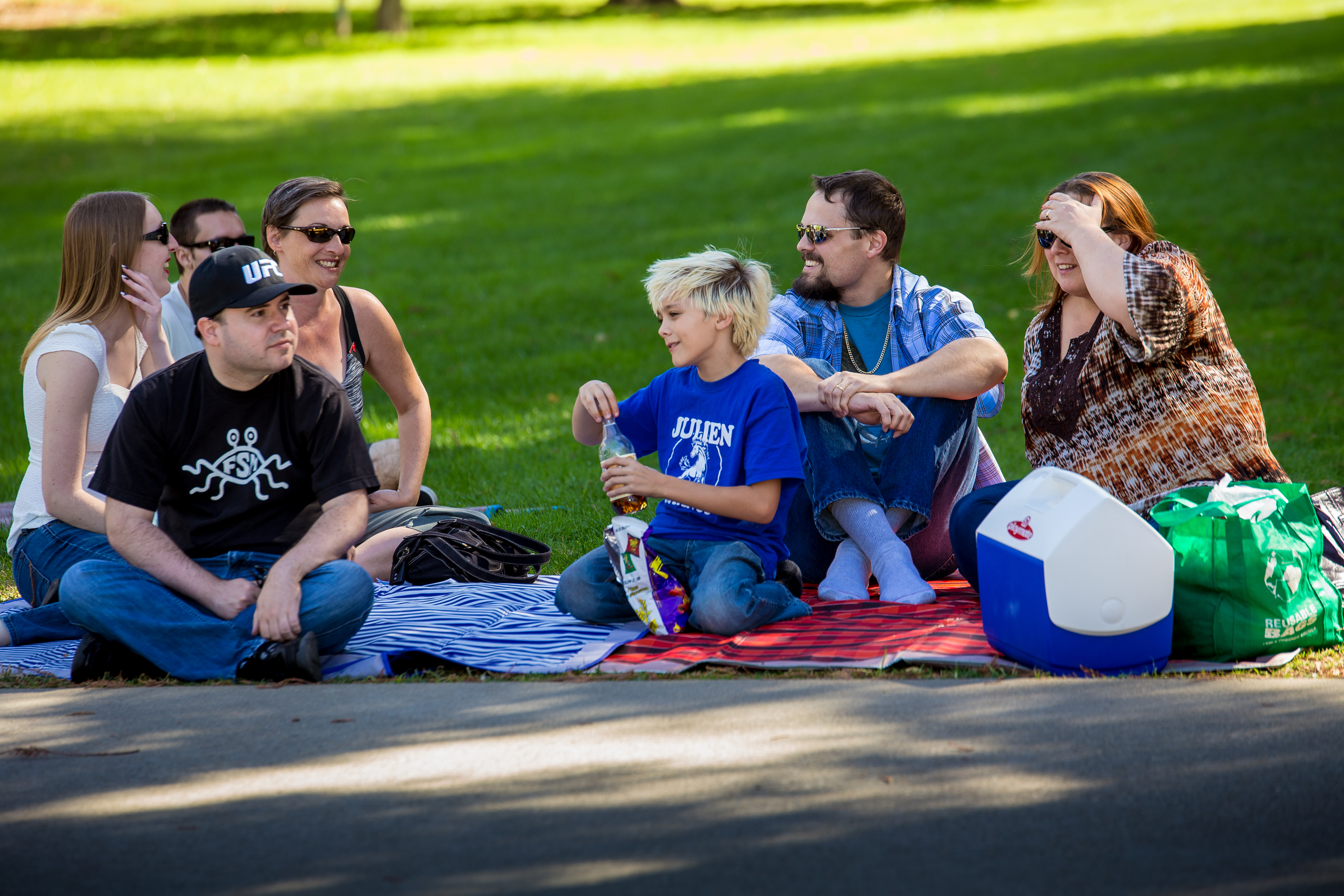
Freethought Day 2014

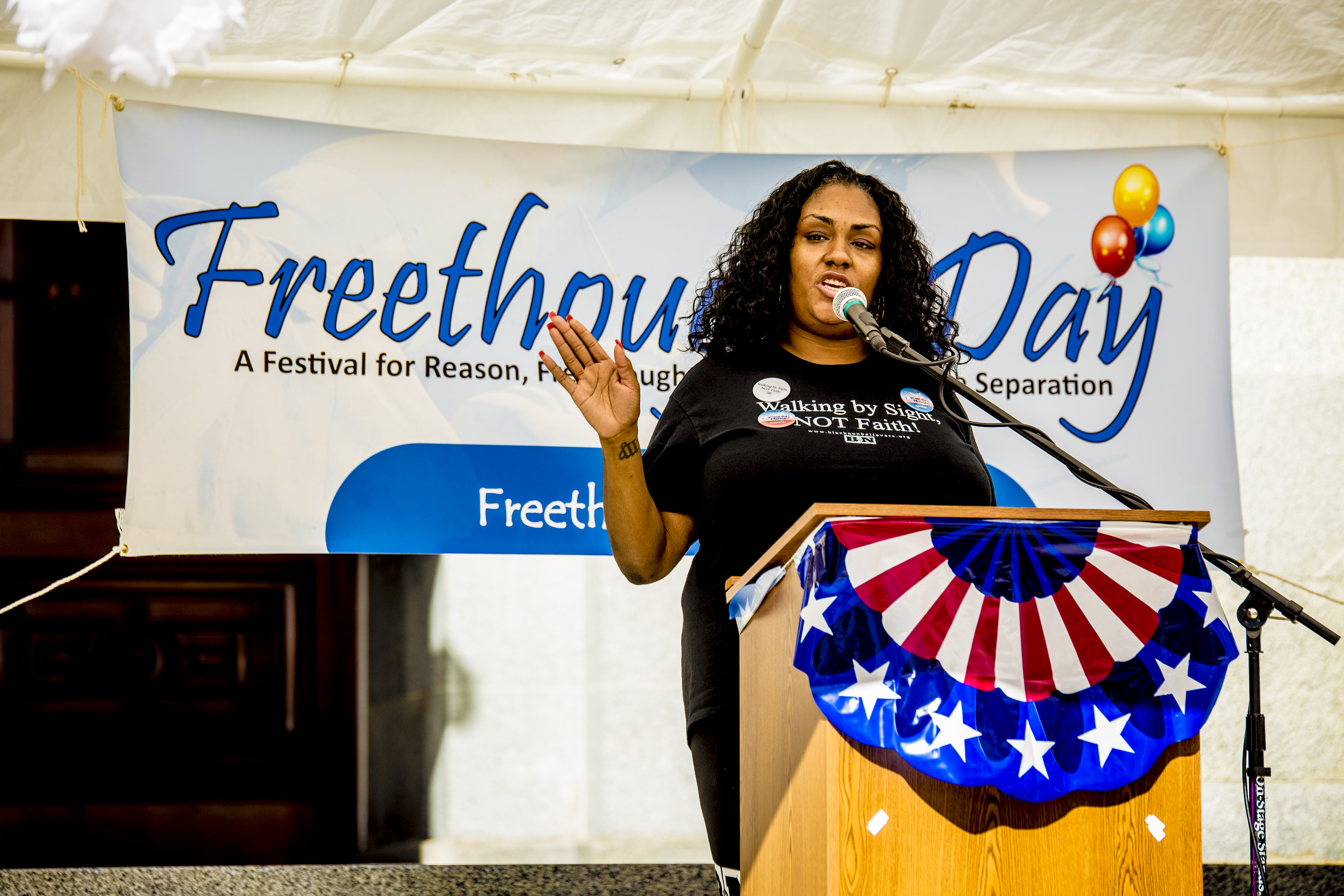
Mandisa Thomas 2015

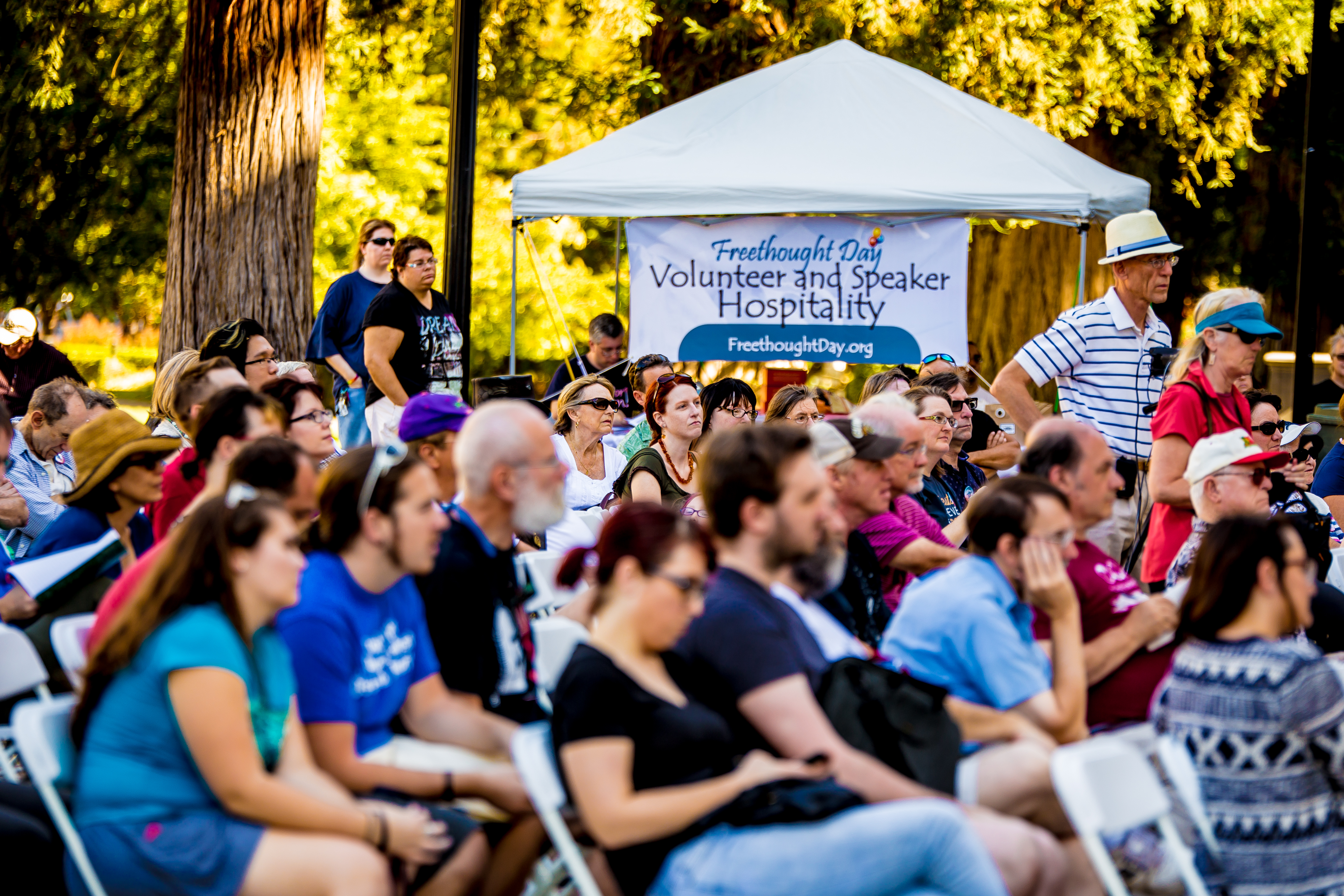
Freethought Day 2014

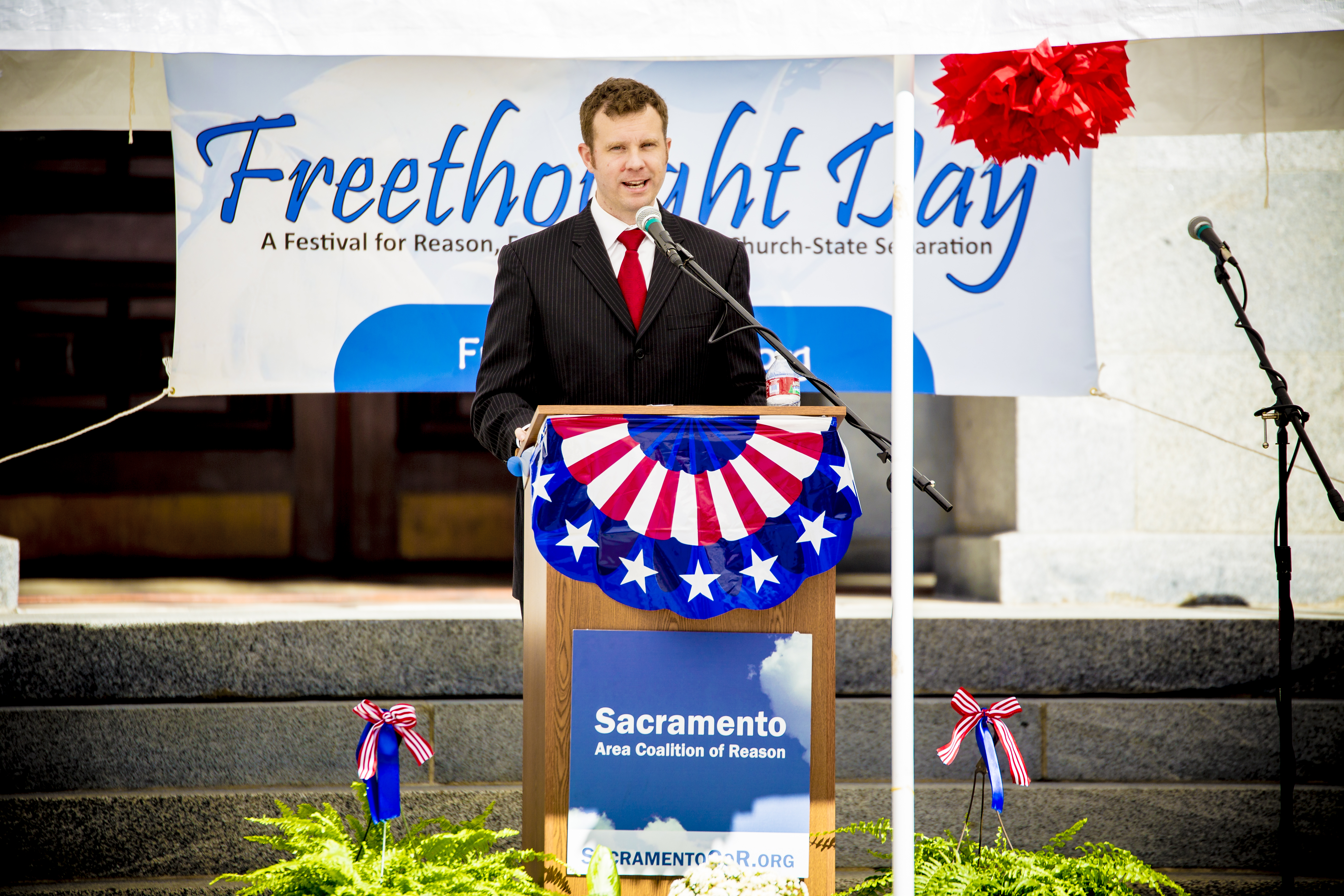
Jason Torpy 2015

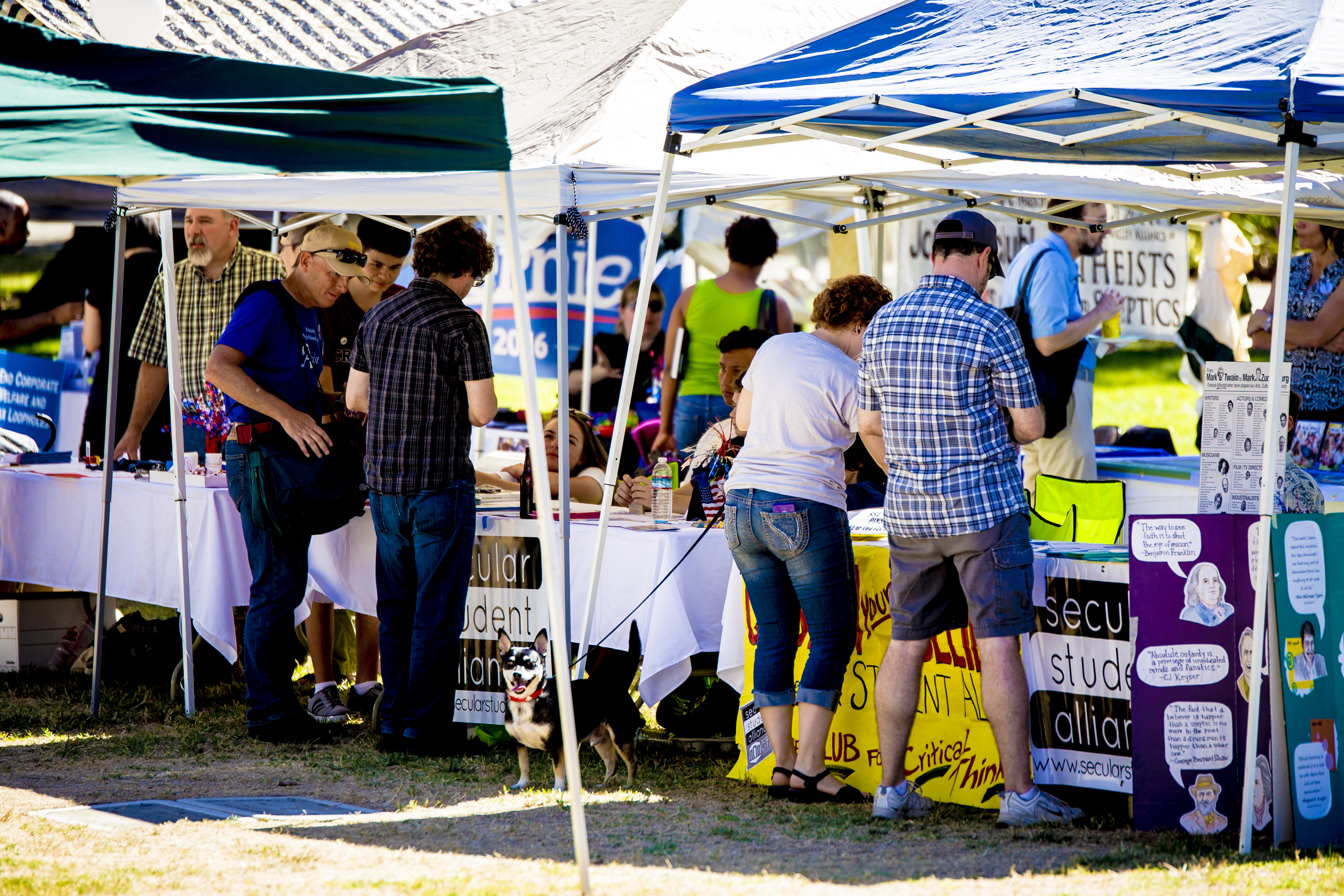
Exhibitors 2015

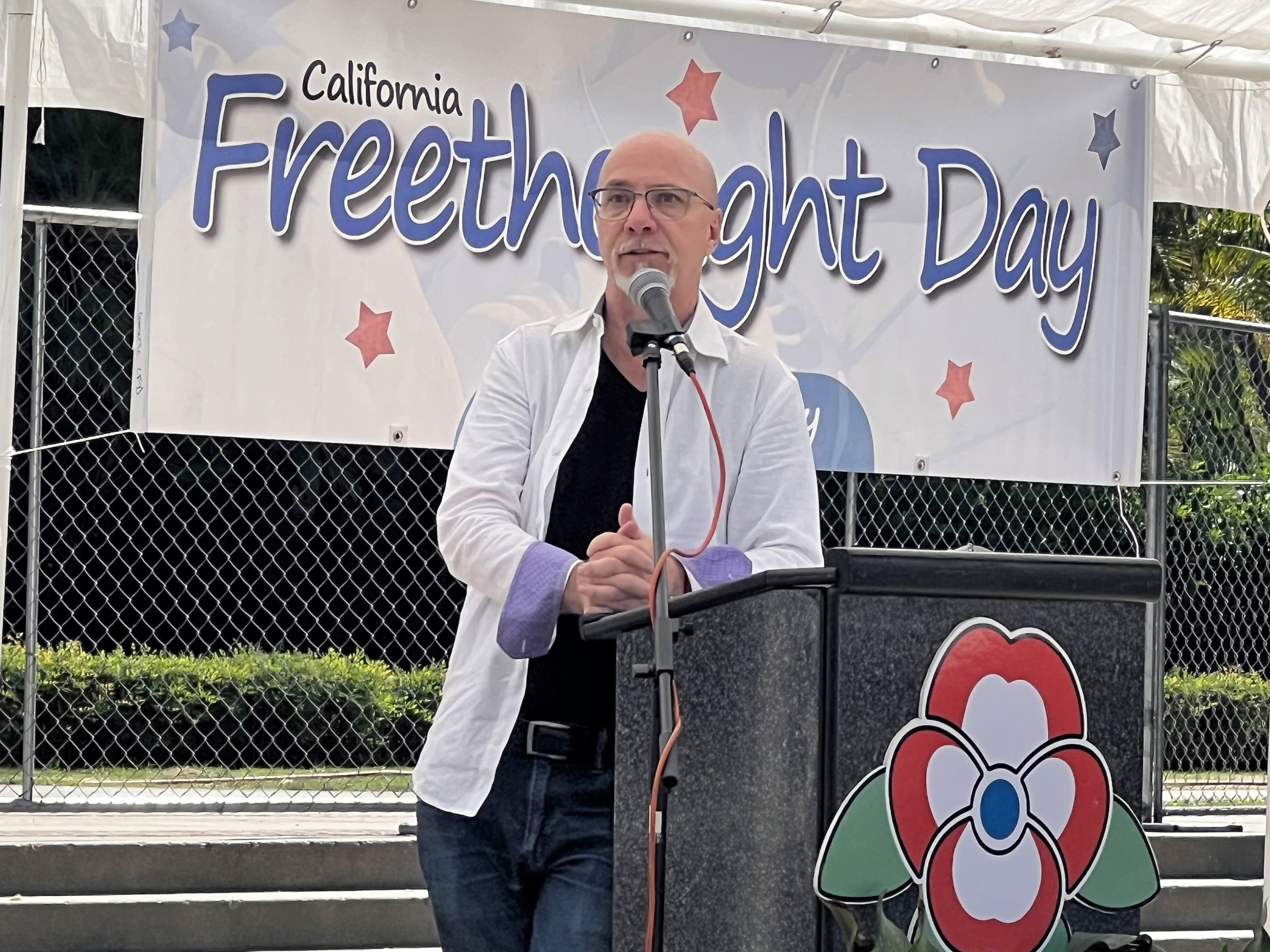
2022 emcee Emery Emery
