= The Atheist Experience =

American live, televised webcast

- Genre: Live call-in talk show
- Starring: Jmike; Forrest Valkai; Kenneth Leonard; Johnny P. Angel; ObjectivelyDan; Jim Barrows; Shannon Q; Dave Warnock
- Theme music composer: Shelley Segal
- Opening theme: "Saved"
- Country of origin: United States
- Original language: English
- No. of episodes: 1000

Production
- Producer: Katie Stewart
- Production locations: Austin, Texas
- Running time: 90 minutes

Original release
- Release: October 19, 1997 – present

Related
- Talk Heathen, Truth Wanted

The Atheist Experience (familiarly known as AXP) is an American live, weekly televised webcast based in Austin, Texas, United States. Listeners are encouraged to call in to discuss the existence of God and related topics. Calls from theists are usually given priority, as the aim of the webcast is to encourage theists to question their theistic beliefs and thus, theists are often asked to explain what they believe, and why.

== History ==
In April 1996, Kellen Von Houser took the initiative of forming a group for atheists in the Austin area by e-mailing local atheists. After several informal monthly gatherings, the Atheist Community of Austin (ACA) was formally founded on December 15, 1996, by which time it had attracted around sixty members. By June 1997, the ACA had its own website, a relatively new medium at the time, to reach out to fellow atheists on the internet. The first episode of The Atheist Experience, a pre-recorded pilot, aired on October 19, 1997.

From the second show onward, the episodes were broadcast live on cable access television on every other Sunday, giving the opportunity to viewers to call the show live. Initially the show's length was one half-hour. Ray Blevins was the show's first host, while Joe Zamecki served as the first co-host.

The show length was extended to an hour in September 1998. From December 1999 on, The Atheist Experience began streaming over the Internet, enabling anyone around the world with Internet access to watch. Since November 2005, The Atheist Experience (as well as The Non-Prophets Radio) has also been distributed as a podcast to a global audience.

A YouTube channel, which became the official channel in August 2012, has over 372,000 subscribers and over 182 million video views as of June 2022. On June 24, 2018, the show aired its 1000th episode.

The first episode (pilot) was recorded at Furr's Cafeteria in October 1997. Subsequent episodes were recorded at the public-access television studio at Austin Public (1143 Northwestern Ave). After 18 years, long-standing logistical and technical issues at the public access studio prompted the crew to move to the ACA's Freethought Library (1507 West Koenig Lane) in October 2015.

The Atheist Experience's success has spawned several spin-off shows also produced by the ACA; as of July 2018, these were The Non-Prophets Radio podcast, the Talk Heathen talk show, the Godless Bitches podcast and The Preaching Humanist television show. In December 2018, the new Secular Sexuality live show was launched. Later came SkepTalk, The Line and The Line Edge.

== Show details ==
=== Purposes ===
Live show at the 2018 American Atheists Convention featuring Russell Glasser and Tracie Harris

The primary purpose of The Atheist Experience is to have a discussion or debate on the existence of gods or related topics between theist callers and the atheist hosts and co-hosts. The Atheist Experience is therefore primarily geared towards a non-atheist audience, and tends to foster confrontational debates. Moreover, the conversations are intended for theists to hear from atheists themselves, rather than from other theists, what atheists actually believe. Another goal is to familiarize the show's audience with relevant arguments and effective debating tactics.

=== Theme song ===
The opening theme used for The Atheist Experience has changed over the years; in some cases due to copyright issues. From August 2009 to August 2015, the theme song was Bryan Steeksma's "Listen to Reason". Following that, Shelley Segal's "Saved" has been used.

=== Topics ===
Although debates about all theism- and atheism-related views are welcome, because of the large number of Christians in the United States and their influence in American politics and society, the emphasis is mostly on Christianity. Frequent topics include religious dogma, morality, ethics, and application of the scientific method.

=== Format ===
The host (on the right) and co-host (on the left) are filmed sitting behind a table. There may also be off-camera spectators in the studio. After the opening sequence featuring the theme song, the co-host often opens with a theme (for example, Don Baker's segment "The Failures of Christianity") or current event discussion, and then the host takes live calls. Callers are put in a waiting queue and screened by the crew before they are put into direct contact with the host and co-host. Although atheists are also allowed to call in, the crew attempts to have at least 50% theists callers. The host has a control panel, which allows them to put a caller temporarily "on hold" in order to clarify a point or address a technical issue, or disconnect a caller who in the host's judgment has been overly rude or has frustrated the discussion.

Some callers hold negative stereotypes about atheists, or misconceptions about atheism and science, and occasionally verbally abuse the hosts, or atheists in general. At times, the hosts reply in kind, or even initiate verbal abuse or mockery of the religious beliefs which a caller may hold. However, friendly and respectful conversations also frequently take place, and are preferred. Author Yuriy Nikshych wrote that The Atheist Experience is "worth watching to get a sense of how to talk to theists", and said it was an "invaluable resource" for people (including himself) in the process of losing their religious beliefs to become atheists.

== Presenters ==
=== Current ===
Graham Martin (AKA, "The Cross Examiner"): a lawyer who practiced FDA Regulatory Law. His paper, Judicial Deference to Administrative Agencies and Its Limits, is taught in Administrate Law classes. He is the owner and host of The Cross Examiner Podcast.

=== Former ===
Matt Dillahunty: "Raise your hands if The Atheist Experience and the debates I've done contributed to you being an atheist."

Host

- Matt Dillahunty: a professional magician, exotic animal breeder, and prior member of the U.S. Navy who was raised a fundamentalist Baptist and was a Christian for more than twenty years. He served in the Navy for eight years before moving to Austin to spend several years in the video game industry. Although he intended to attend seminary and pursue a career in the ministry, he came to reject his previous theistic beliefs. He co-founded Iron Chariots, a counter-apologetics wiki, co-presented The Atheist Experience for the first time in March 2005 and served as the president of the Atheist Community of Austin from 2006 to 2013. On October 2, 2022, Matt announced, at the beginning of the live episode, that it would be his final episode. In response to this surprise announcement, the ACA leadership locked him out of his ACA email account and posted an announcement portraying Dillahunty's departure as a retirement as host of The Atheist Experience, almost eighteen years after his first broadcast. Approximately one month later, they canceled his life membership.

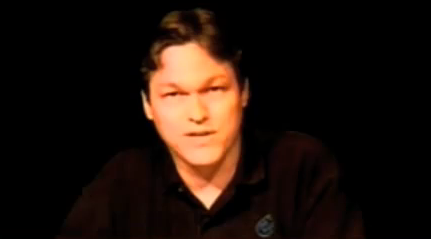
Jeff Dee on The Atheist Experience in 2009

- Don Baker: a computer scientist in the field of computer-supported cooperative work, who has a strong interest in the field of memetics and has spent several years exploring the implications of Christianity as a meme complex. He has served as secretary of the Atheist Community of Austin.
- Jeff Dee: an artist and game designer whose work shows comic book form and influence. He is the co-creator of Villains and Vigilantes, illustrator of the Dungeons & Dragons manual Deities & Demigods, artist for Master of Orion, art director for Ultima VII, and lead designer for The Sims: Castaway Stories. He co-created The Non Prophets, an Internet radio show.
- Keryn Glasser: a gerontological social worker who has worked in hospice and, having come from a Jewish atheist background, is "interested in exploring death and dying from a non-religious perspective." She identifies as a "pacifistic, animal loving, tree hugging, vegan."
- Russell Glasser: a software engineer who has been involved in The Atheist Experience since 2000 and produced the internet radio show The Non Prophets. He has served on the ACA board and was elected ACA president in 2016.
- Ashley Perrien: served as co-host and host from 2001 to 2008
- Ray Blevins: served as host from 1998 to 2000
- Martin Wagner: an artist, cartoonist, and filmmaker who self-published the comic book Hepcats.
- Tracie Harris: a former Christian fundamentalist who has worked as a graphic artist, cartoonist, and publishing professional and has drawn the Atheist Eve strip hosted on the Atheist Community of Austin website. She has served as secretary and vice president of the ACA board and has co-hosted the GB 2.0 podcast since February 2018.
- John Iacoletti: became a co-host on March 24, 2013 (episode 806), after operating the cameras and providing technical assistance. He brought a Unitarian perspective to the show. Iacoletti has served as a board member of the ACA several years, as of 2018–19 as treasurer.
- Jen Peeples: an aerospace engineer and self-described "foxhole atheist" who served in the U.S. Army for 26 years, retiring as a lieutenant colonel. She is openly gay and has co-hosted GB 2.0 podcast, the reboot of Godless Bitches, since February 2018. She has served as president of the ACA board.
- Phil Session: became a co-host on June 26, 2016, having previously worked on the television crew. In college, he tried to reconcile his Christian faith with his homosexuality; failing, he left Christianity and first identified as 'spiritual but not religious', then a 'nonbeliever' after accepting the argument from inconsistent revelations, and finally as an atheist when he heard that word on a YouTube podcast. He served as vice president of the ACA.
- Jenna Belk
- Apostate Prophet

In June 2019, Tracie Harris, Jen Peeples, John Iacoletti, and Phil Session left the show after a disagreement with the ACA's handling of a guest host who made a controversial video on trans women athletes.

=== Notable guest appearances ===
Occasionally, a notable scientist, scholar or activist is invited to take the role of co-host on the show; after an interview with the host, the guest participates in answering calls. These have included:

- Seth Andrews, host of The Thinking Atheist podcast and video producer, former Christian radio show host (episode #22.25), guest appearance
- Ray Comfort, Evangelical Christian apologist (episode #702), live call-in
- Kathleen Johnson, vice-president of American Atheists and founder of the Military Association of Atheists & Freethinkers (episode #647, 2010-03-07), guest appearance
- Alex Jones, conspiracy theorist (episodes #73 [3.10] 1999-03-07 & #142 [4.27] 2000-07-02), live call-ins
- Mark Loewe, theoretical physicist (episode #393, 2005-04-24), guest appearance
- Noah Lugeons, host and creator of The Scathing Atheist podcast (episode 23:02)
- Jonathan McLatchie, doctoral student in cell biology, Apologetics Academy (episode #22.31, 2018-08-05), live call-in
- Kyle Miller, pastor (episode #639, 2010-01-10), guest appearance
- Greg Paul, paleontologist (episode #708, 2011-05-08), guest appearance
- Aron Ra, vlogger and Texas state director of the American Atheists (episodes #648, #668, #703, #875), live guest appearances
- Darrel Ray, organizational psychologist (episode #645, 2010-02-21; #686, 2010-12-05), guest appearances
- David Silverman, president of American Atheists (episode #701, 2011-03-20), live call-in
- Matt Slick, Evangelical Christian apologist (episode #593 broadcast February 22, 2009), live call-in
- David Smalley of podcast Dogma Debate and the American Atheists (episode #753, 2012-03-18), guest appearance
- Victor J. Stenger, particle physicist (episode #499, 2007-05-06), guest appearance
- Mandisa Thomas, the founder and president of Black Nonbelievers Inc (episode #22.38, September 23, 2018), guest appearance
- Forrest Valkai, biologist and paleoanthropologist, creator of the ValkaiLabs website; his YouTube channel presence is @RenegadeScienceTeacher as a science popularizer and teacher (multiple episodes)

== Awards ==
- About.com Readers' Choice Awards 2012, Favorite Agnostic / Atheist Podcast of 2011
- The Austin Chronicle, Best of Austin 2012: Best Public Access TV Show
- The Austin Chronicle, Best of Austin 2011: Best Public Access TV Show
- About.com Readers' Choice Awards 2011, Best Atheist Podcast, 2010
- The Austin Chronicle, Best of Austin 2010: Best Public-Access TV Show

== See also ==
- American Atheists
- Freedom From Religion Foundation
- Humanist Canada
- List of secularist organizations
- Secular Student Alliance
- A Secular Humanist Declaration
- Discrimination against atheists in the United States
