= Camp Quest UK =

Children's humanist summer camp

- Fun, friends and freethought!
- Formation: 2008
- Director: Samantha Stein
- Website: www.camp-quest.org.uk

Camp Quest UK (CQUK) is a British secular humanist summer camp which aims to promote critical thinking in children while providing a residential camping holiday to children in the United Kingdom. The camps are designed to encourage children to 'Question, Understand, Explore, Search and Test' and often use a group of philosophical techniques called Philosophy for Children (P4C) to develop reasoning and creative thinking skills.

== History ==
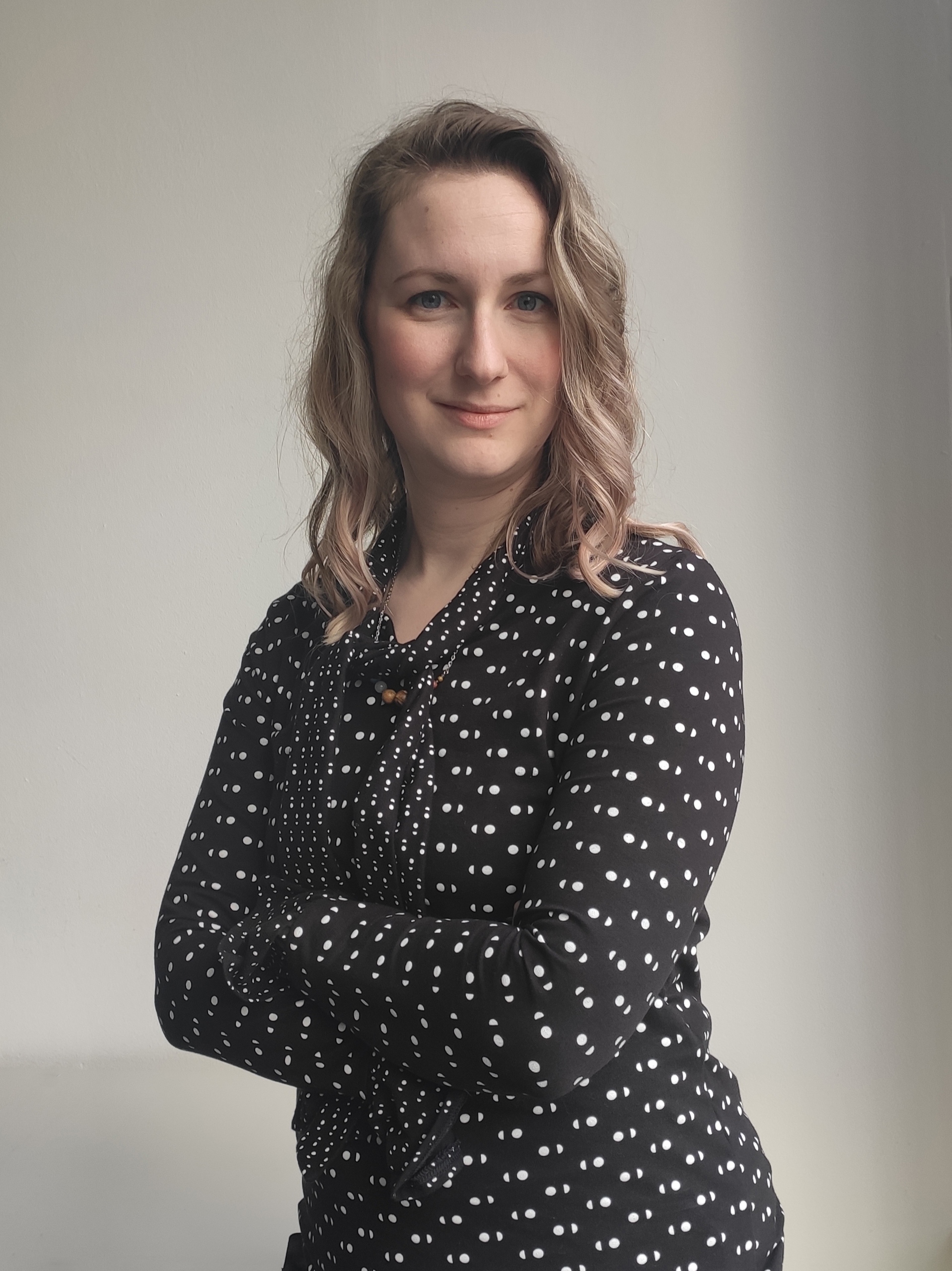
Samantha Stein, 2020

Camp Quest began in the United States as a non-religious humanist summer camp for children in 1996. It was conceived by a small committee of members of the Free Inquiry Group of Cincinnati and Northern Kentucky (FIG) with Helen and Edwin Kagin acting as directors for the first ten years. In 2000 Camp Quest expanded with independent camps operating throughout the United States with the same mission statement, eventually becoming Camp Quest Inc. in 2007 with Fred Edwords as its first president.

After reading about Camp Quest in Richard Dawkins' The God Delusion, Samantha Stein became a volunteer for the organisation at a camp in Michigan and was prompted to start a similar camp in the UK. Camp Quest UK was started by Stein and a group of volunteers in 2008, supported by a grant from the Richard Dawkins Foundation for Reason and Science, and hosted its first camp in 2009 in Somerset for children aged 8-17. Stein, who has a degree in Psychology and a Masters in Religion in Contemporary Society, initially fielded a considerable amount of press interest when the Sunday Times broadsheet newspaper ran a front page article on Camp Quest UK; the headline read 'Dawkins sets up kids’ camp to groom atheists'. The Times later went on to include it in their Best kids camps in Britain and 10 best kids' adventure holidays.

The name originates from the initials "Question, Understand, Explore, Search and Test", reflecting the ethos of Camp Quest UK. Stein was keen to promote a more reason-based, inclusive camp for children from a mix of religions including children with no religion. At the time she set up Camp Quest UK, Christian Camping International estimated that "more than one million Britons attend faith vacations through their affiliates every year."

Camp Quest UK has been supported by several secular organisations including Humanists UK, Good Thinking Society, National Secular Society and the Richard Dawkins Foundation for Reason and Science.

As of 2018 Camp Quest Inc. operates thirteen affiliated camps in the USA and in addition to Camp Quest UK also operates in Switzerland and Norway.

== Camp activities ==
At Camp Quest UK, participants discuss philosophical ideas, learn about subjects such as astronomy, and take part in traditional camp activities. The camp aims to promote co-operation, tolerance, and empathy, and teaches children how to think for themselves on matters such as religion and ethics.

Children are taught and encouraged to use creative thinking and reasoning skills using a set of philosophical techniques known as Philosophy for Children (P4C). Children can explore concepts such as morality, honesty and justice.

At Camp Quest UK children are also encourage to use scientific method and reasoning to problem solve, and activities can also involve investigating evolution, astronomy and paleontology. In recent years there are two camps running at different times and locations divided by the age of participants, junior camp for children aged 7-11, and senior camp for ages 11-17. A central theme is chosen for each year, past themes have included: Evolution (2009), The Mind (2010), What is Science (2011), Humanity and Language (2012), The Future (2013), Worlds within our World (2014), Artificial Intelligence (2015), Space (2017), Thought (2018) and Sustainable Futures (2019).

In addition to reasoning and science based activities Camp Quest UK also hosts traditional camping and Outward Bound style activities such as campfires, learning to canoe, swimming, trekking and cooking. The 2017 camp also included outdoor sports such as "archery, zip wire, climbing, high ropes, rafting, the Great Wall, air rifle shooting, mountain biking, night line, abseiling and the assault course."

=== Invisible unicorn challenge ===
During Camp Quest UK attendees are tasked with the invisible unicorn challenge, aimed at showing that a negative cannot be proven. The task is one of the ways used to encourage children to exercise critical thinking and explore ideas about the burden of proof and challenges the children to prove that invisible unicorns do not exist. The children are told that two invisible unicorns exist at Camp Quest UK and that there is a valuable book proving their existence which has been passed from generation to generation but no one is allowed to read. Any child who can prove they do not exist stands to win a £10 note signed by Dawkins. The prize has not yet been claimed.

== See also ==
- Invisible Pink Unicorn
- Kibbo Kift
- Order of Woodcraft Chivalry
- Scouting
- Wandervogel
- The Woodcraft Folk
