= Fewtrell =

Fewtrell is a surname. Notable people with the surname include:

- Albert Fewtrell (1885–1950), Australian railway engineer and army officer
- Malcolm Fewtrell (1909–2005), British police officer
- Max Fewtrell (born 1999), British racing driver
- Percy Fewtrell (died 1970), Australian cleric

== See also ==
- Futrell
