= Shelley Segal =

Secular singer and songwriter

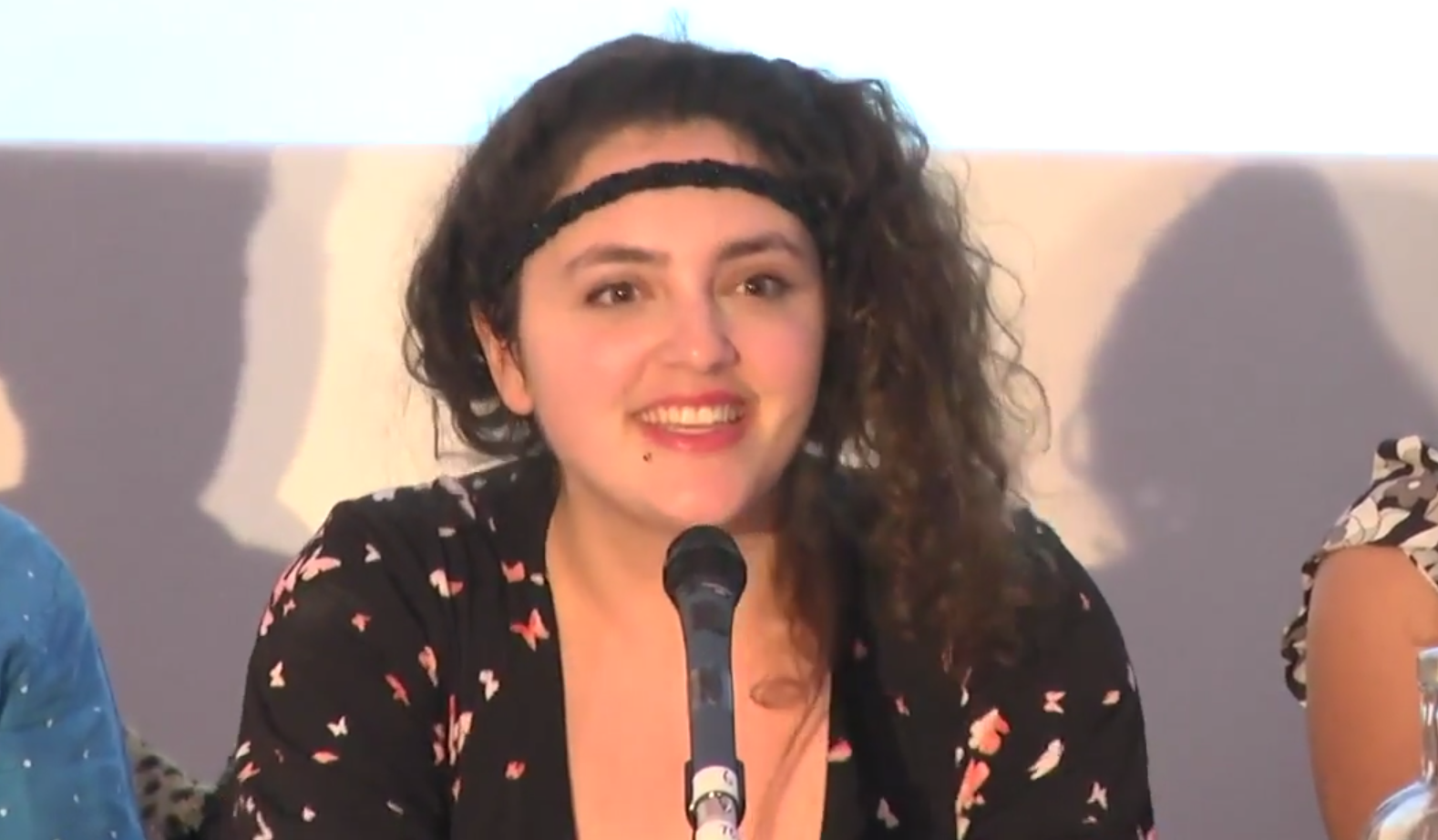
- Shelley Segal at the International Conference on Free Expression and Conscience 2017.
- Born: 4 April 1987 (age 39); Melbourne, Australia
- Occupation: Singer-songwriter
- Musical career
- Genres: Folk; folk rock; pop; jazz; dance
- Instruments: Singing; acoustic guitar
- Labels: True Music; 411 Music Group
- Website: www.shelleysegal.com
- Influences: Ani DiFranco; Alanis Morissette; Jewel; Katie Noonan; Dave Matthews Band; Ben Harper; Sarah McLachlan
- Shelley Segal's voice Recorded November 2018

Shelley Segal (born 4 April 1987) is an Australian singer and songwriter who is currently based in the United States. She is most known for music with secular themes, including her 2011 album, An Atheist Album and has played at many atheist/secular events including the Reason Rally, the American Humanist Association conference, California Free Thought Day, the Global Atheist Convention, ReAsonCon, Gateway to Reason, and Reasonfest. Her first single, "Saved", is currently used as the opening theme by the webcast and cable access television show The Atheist Experience.

== Biography ==
=== Early life ===
Segal was born in Melbourne, Australia. She was raised in a traditional Jewish household. Her father, Danny Segal, is the president of the East Melbourne Synagogue (as of August 2017) and plays violin in a klezmer wedding band. At the age of 11, Shelley Segal began singing in her father's band and writing her own songs. She came to call herself an atheist around the age of 18. With a different perspective, Segal began to see religion more negatively than when a theist, taking issue with things such as gender segregation in Orthodox Jewish synagogues. Segal also identifies as a humanist.

=== Career ===
Segal performs in London in 2017.

Segal speaks about music as a means to criticise ideas, and help society forward.

Segal released her first recording, Shelley Segal EP, in 2009. It is composed of songs Segal wrote at ages 15–21.

In 2011, Segal released her album An Atheist Album. She says she created it "firstly as an expression of my honest response to [the debate between religious and secular world-views]." It contains the following songs:

- "Apocalyptic Love Song" (on human insignificance and finding meaning in life, dedicated to Christopher Hitchens)
- "Afterlife" (on the impacts of believing in an afterlife)
- "House With No Walls" (on people creating unique, personal beliefs when they don't fully agree with religious doctrine and on avoiding questioning one's beliefs)
- "Gratitude" (on appreciating and being grateful for life without religious belief)
- "Saved" (on the concept of eternal torment and those who use it as an evangelical tool) This was Segal's first single; it is currently used as the opening theme for the webcast and cable access television show, The Atheist Experience.
- "I Don't Believe In Fairies" (on the lack of evidence for the supernatural)
- "Eve" (on misogyny in the Bible)

Segal co-wrote and provided vocals for the Carl Cox dance song Chemistry.

In 2013, Segal toured with guitarist Adam Levy and released the album Little March in collaboration with him. The songs of the album deal with love and relationships.

Segal released her album An Easy Escape in 2014. The reggae-inspired song Morocco from this album became controversial in Morocco. A song based on her experiences travelling in Morocco, many in Morocco criticized references to drug use in Morocco. The Moroccan news site Afriquinfos claimed she "denounced the kingdom [of Morocco]." About the song, Segal said to Fairfax Media: "It's just to contrast that situation as a tourist and having fun and getting to escape my troubles, contrasted with some troubles local people are facing and questioning what is my place here ... and what troubles do I actually have."

In 2015, Segal released her EP Strange Feeling. The body-positive song Sidelined from this album was a finalist in the 2016 Unsigned Only competition.

In 2016, Segal signed with Los Angeles publishing house 411 Music Group and moved to Los Angeles.

== Discography ==
=== Albums ===
- An Atheist Album (2011), True Music
- Little March (2013) with Adam Levy, True Music
- An Easy Escape (2014), True Music

=== EPs ===
- Shelley Segal EP (2009)
- Strange Feeling (2015)
- Forms (2018)
- Holy (2019)
- After We Leave (2025)

=== Singles ===
- Saved (2011)
- Chemistry (2011) with Carl Cox
- Begin Again (2017)
- Our Resistance (2019)
- Waiting For Water (2020)
- Ghostly Afterimage (2021)
- Pull You Down (2021)
- Sing (2021)
- Sparks Are Flying (2021) with Prince Chapelle and Dominic Vos
- Unloved (2022)
- Chlorophyll (2023) with Moe Dizz
- Mother (2023)
- Lonely Christmas (2023) with Zion Anthony
- Prince's Song (2024)
- The Way You Make Me Feel (2024)
- The Way You Make Me Feel – stripped back version (2024)
- Pretty Side (2024)
- Free (2024)
- Beautiful (2024)
- After We Leave (2024)
- I Believe In You (2025)
