= Mythicist Milwaukee =

- Formation: 2013
- Type: 501(c)(3)
- Purpose: Promote atheism and Christ myth theory; oppose religion in the public sphere
- Location: Milwaukee, Wisconsin, U.S.
- Key people: Sean Fracek (President); Antonio Blandon (Vice-President)
- Website: mythinformed.org (dead link)

Mythicist Milwaukee is the former name of a nonprofit atheist secular organization founded in Milwaukee, Wisconsin, by Sean Fracek and Antonio (Fritz) Blandon in January 2013, after viewing the film Zeitgeist: The Movie, directed by Peter Joseph, which claimed that today's Western religions are derived from ancient Sun and Nature worshipers. Fracek and Blandon made contact with the late author D. M. Murdock, also known as Acharya S, who encouraged them to do their own independent research into the Christ myth theory. Several years after its founding, it changed its name to "Mythinformed Milwaukee" and changed its goal to "promoting viewpoint diversity in the social and political landscape." The organization continues to pursue projects "including filmmaking, conference organizing, comedy tours, talent management, podcasting, and vlogging."

== Mythinformation Conference ==
The Mythinformation Conference, or Mythcon, is a day-long conference organized by Mythicist Milwaukee. The first Mythinformation Conference was held on April 25, 2015. Brian Edwards, James Kirk Wall, and Hemant Mehta presented talks on secular subjects. The event was headlined by Richard Carrier.

The Mythinformation Conference II was held on September 27, 2015. Mandisa Thomas, Arthur George, David Fitzgerald and the Wu-Tang Clan's Killah Priest spoke at the event. This was Killah Priest's first lecture and an atheist/secular conference. Afterwards, Mario Quadracci the Mythicist Milwaukee, funded an atheist debate series entitled Buzzed Belief.

The Mythinformation Conference III was held on October 21, 2016. This conference featured Allie Jackson (CEO of Atheist Republic), Thomas Smith (podcast host of Atheistically Speaking), Rob Moore, and Dan Barker (Co-President of the Freedom From Religion Foundation). This event was closed out with the Buzzed Belief debate between Robert M. Price and Bart D. Ehrman that focused on whether or not historical Jesus existed.
