= William Thomas Cummings =

American chaplain

Father William Thomas Cummings
- Born: October 30, 1903; San Francisco, California
- Disappeared: January 18, 1945 (aged 41) aboard SS Brazil Maru, Tsushima Strait, Empire of Japan (MIA)
- Military career
- Allegiance: United States
- Branch: US Army
- Enlisted: 1940-1945
- Rank: First Lieutenant
- Unit: U.S. Army Chaplain Corps
- Commands: Sternberg General Hospital
- Conflicts: World War II; Battle of the Philippines (POW)
- Memorials: Name listed on the Walls of the Missing at the Manila American Cemetery

Personal life
- Education: St. Patrick’s Seminary (1917-1927)

Religious life
- Institute: Maryknoll Mission
- Church: Catholic Church
- Profession: Priest, missionary
- Ordination: June 16, 1928

William Thomas Cummings (October 30, 1903 – January 18, 1945) was a Maryknoll mission priest and U.S. military chaplain, recognized by Maryknoll as a martyr of the Philippines, is one of the people to whom the quotation "There are no atheists in foxholes" has been attributed. Some of the others possibly responsible for the aphorism's currency were also present at the Battle of Bataan in 1942, when Cummings might have said it.

Ordained on June 16, 1928, Father Cummings was sent to Manila to teach in 1940, after working in San Francisco for ten years. On December 10, 1941, he was serving at Sternberg General Hospital in Manila when that city came under attack, and is reported to have worked tirelessly. This was the first of many such episodes that made Cummings a legend in his own time.

Known for his openness to helping soldiers of all faiths, Father Cummings was taken prisoner with the men he was serving, continued to minister to them, and is said to have died a prisoner aboard the SS Brazil Maru.
