= Brights movement =

International intellectual movement

Bright movement
- Formation: 2003; 23 years ago
- Type: Non-profit
- Purpose: Promotion of naturalism and the bright label
- Region served: Worldwide
- Official language: English
- Co-directors: Paul Geisert and Mynga Futrell
- Website: the-brights.net

The Brights movement is a social movement whose members, since 2003, refer to themselves as Brights and have a worldview of philosophical naturalism.

Most Brights believe that public policies should be based on science (a body of knowledge obtained and tested by use of the scientific method). Brights are likely to oppose the practice of basing public policies on supernatural doctrines. Brights may therefore be described as secularists.

== Terminology ==
The Bright movement has proposed the following terminology:

- super (noun): someone whose worldview includes supernatural and/or mystical elements
- bright (noun): someone whose worldview is naturalistic (no supernatural and mystical elements)
- Bright: a bright who has registered on the Bright website as a member of the movement

== History ==
Paul Geisert and his wife Mynga Futrell, freelance writers living in Sacramento, coined the term bright in March 2003 and launched The-Brights.net.

In deciding to attend the Godless Americans March on Washington in 2002, Geisert disliked the label "godless". He sought a new, positive word that might be well accepted and improve the image of those who did not believe in the supernatural. Geisert later came up with the noun "bright" after brainstorming many ideas. He then ran into another room and told his wife: "I've got the word, and this is going to be big!" Paul Geisert died November 17, 2020.

After coming up with the term they pitched their idea to friends and decided to unveil their idea at an Atheist Alliance International conference in Tampa, Florida in Spring 2003. They called the organizers and got permission to present the idea. They made their proposal at the conference, which was attended by Richard Dawkins. They launched the Brights' Net website on June 4, 2003. The movement gained early publicity through articles by Richard Dawkins in The Guardian and Wired; and by Daniel Dennett in The New York Times.

The movement continued to grow and experienced accelerated registrations following media debate around New Atheism prompted by a series of book releases in late 2006 including The God Delusion, Breaking the Spell, God Is Not Great, The End of Faith and Letter to a Christian Nation. The movement has grown to be a constituency of over 78,000 Brights in 204 nations and territories.

== Brights ==
Many, but not all, Brights also identify as atheist, antitheist, humanist (specifically secular humanist), freethinker, irreligionist, naturalist, materialist or physicalist, agnostic, skeptic, or even naturalistic pantheist. Even so, the "movement is not associated with any defined beliefs". The website Brights' Net says its goal is to include the umbrella term "bright" in the vocabulary of this existing "community of reason".

However, "the broader intent is inclusive of the many-varied persons whose worldview is naturalistic", but are in the "general population" as opposed to associating solely with the "community of reason". Thus, persons who can declare their naturalistic worldview using the term bright extend beyond the familiar secularist categories as long as they do not hold theistic worldviews. Registrations even include some members of the clergy, such as Presbyterian ministers and a Church History Professor and ordained priest.

Dawkins compares the coining of bright to the "triumph of consciousness-raising" from the term gay:

Gay is succinct, uplifting, positive: an "up" word, where homosexual is a down word, and queer, faggot and pooftah are insults. Those of us who subscribe to no religion; those of us whose view of the universe is natural rather than supernatural; those of us who rejoice in the real and scorn the false comfort of the unreal, we need a word of our own, a word like "gay"[,] [...] a noun hijacked from an adjective, with its original meaning changed but not too much. Like gay, it should be catchy: a potentially prolific meme. Like gay, it should be positive, warm, cheerful, bright.

Despite the explicit difference between the noun and adjective, there have been comments on the comparison. In his Wired article, Dawkins stated: "Whether there is a statistical tendency for brights (noun) to be bright (adjective) is a matter for research".

Notable people who have self-identified as brights at one time or another include: biologists Richard Dawkins and Richard J. Roberts; cognitive scientist Steven Pinker; philosophers Daniel Dennett and Massimo Pigliucci; stage magicians and debunkers James Randi and Penn & Teller; Amy Alkon; Sheldon Glashow; Babu Gogineni; Edwin Kagin; Mel Lipman; Piergiorgio Odifreddi; and Air America Radio talk show host Lionel.

=== Contrasted with supers ===
Daniel Dennett suggests in his book Breaking the Spell: Religion as a Natural Phenomenon that if non-naturalists are concerned with connotations of the word "Bright", then they should invent an equally positive sounding word for themselves, like "Supers" (i.e., one whose world view contains supernaturalism). He also suggested this during his presentation at the Atheist Alliance International convention in 2007. Geisert and Futrell maintain that the neologism has always had a kinship with the Enlightenment, an era which celebrated the possibilities of science and a certain amount of free inquiry. They have endorsed the use of super as the antonym to bright.

== Symbol ==
The Brights' avatar represents a celestial body viewed from space. As there is no up or down or right or left in outer space, the arrangement of planet and darkness and starlight is changeable. Although the symbol is open to the viewer's interpretation, it is generally meant to invoke transition and a sense of gradual illumination. The intentional ambiguity of the avatar is meant to symbolically reflect an important question: Is the future of humankind becoming luminous or more dim? The Brights aspire "to take the promising route, whereby the imagery brings to mind a gradually increasing illumination for this earth of ours, an escalation of enlightenment". This optimistic interpretation of the Brights' symbol is summarized by the motto "Embrightenment Now!".

== Name controversy ==
The movement has been criticised by some (both religious and non-religious) who have objected to the adoption of the title "bright" because they believe it suggests that the individuals with a naturalistic worldview are more intelligent ("brighter") than non-naturalists, such as philosophical skeptics or idealists, believers in the paranormal, philosophical theists, or the religious. For example, the Committee for Skeptical Inquiry published an article by Chris Mooney titled "Not Too 'Bright'" in which he stated that although he agreed with the movement, Richard Dawkins's and Daniel Dennett's "campaign to rename religious unbelievers 'brights' could use some rethinking" because of the possibility that the term would be misinterpreted. The journalist and noted atheist Christopher Hitchens likewise found it a "cringe-making proposal that atheists should conceitedly nominate themselves to be called 'brights'".

In response to this, Daniel Dennett has stated:

There was also a negative response, largely objecting to the term that had been chosen [not by me]: bright, which seemed to imply that others were dim or stupid. But the term, modeled on the highly successful hijacking of the ordinary word "gay" by homosexuals, does not have to have that implication. Those who are not gays are not necessarily glum; they're straight. Those who are not brights are not necessarily dim.
