= Prometheus camps =

Finnish secular coming-of-age camps

Prometheus camps are politically and religiously unaffiliated coming-of-age camps originally arranged in Finland. They were conceived as an alternative to religious confirmation camps. The camps are named after the Greek myth of the titan Prometheus who stole fire from the gods and gave it to the people. The objective of the camps is to encourage young people to reflect on and develop their own philosophy of life, to respect oneself and others, as well as taking responsibility for oneself and the world. The concept of Prometheus camps was acknowledged as a social innovation in Finland in 2006.

== Background ==
The first Prometheus camp was held in 1989 when the students of a secondary school ethics class developed the idea for an alternative to the Christian confirmation camps usually attended by 15-year-olds in Finland. The first camp was arranged by Feto ry (Teachers of Philosophy and Ethics) and a year later the Prometheus Camp Association (Protu) was founded. In 2009 the Prometheus camp movement spread to Sweden where a sister organization to Protu, Protus Sverige, was formed. In 2012 The Prometheus Camp Association was one of the largest youth organisations in Finland along with Finnish Scouts and the youth organisation of the National Coalition Party.

Participation in Prometheus camps and other Prometheus activities does not require a commitment to any values, politics, or religion. In summer 2006, a questionnaire given to Prometheus campers revealed that approximately 20% of campers had also attended another coming-of-age camp, usually the confirmation camps arranged by the Evangelical Lutheran church. Roughly the same percentage of people attending Prometheus camps were also members of a church. In 2009 about a third of the campers also participated in the confirmation camp.

Approximately 9740 young people attended Prometheus camps in Finland between 1989 and 2008. In 2008, 67 camps were organized in different parts of Finland, and about 1000 young people (1.5% of that age-group) attended those camps. The attendance was fairly steady for a number of years. In 2012 there were 69 camps with about 900 participants. In 2010 the Prometheus Camp Association organised a total of 67 Prometheus camps and had a budget of EUR 464,553. State grants accounted for EUR 82,000 of the budget. Direct expenses from the camps totalled EUR 178,599, and counsellor training cost EUR 76,013. A distinct feature of the camps is that the staff do their work as volunteers.

The Prometheus Camp Association is a collaborative partner of the International Humanist and Ethical Youth Organisation (IHEYO).

== Camp structure ==
Camps are attended after the 8th or 9th grade or between the ages of 14 and 16. For young people who have passed this age Prometheus organizes so called senior camps. Typically, the camps are attended by 18 campers. Prometheus camps are led by a team consisting of two adult leaders and five co-leaders. Co-leaders are between the ages of 15 and 19 and participants of earlier summers camps, whereas adult leaders are older. At Prometheus camps, both the leaders and the co-leaders participate in the processing, developing, preparation, planning and implementation of the themes throughout the camp. Adult leaders hold juridical responsibility of the camp.

Prometheus camps last eight days, typically from Sunday to Sunday. All camps deal with the following themes: differences and discrimination, intoxicants and addiction, the environment, society and participation, human relationships and sexuality, the future, worldviews and beliefs.

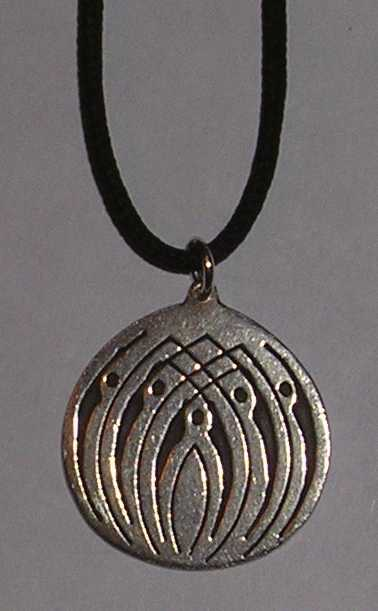
Prometheus medallion

Campers are encouraged to share their own views and perceptions and discuss them, as well as take into account the often-different opinions of others. There are no lessons, only topics that are processed mostly through group discussions. Other methods of processing include debates, games, drama, group work, and other interactive methods. Prometheus camps may also invite guest speakers.

A Prometheus celebration is arranged on the last day of the Prometheus camp, with the families of the campers invited to participate. At the celebration the campers receive a wreath made out of fresh branches or flowers, and a silver Prometheus medallion. The camper’s name, camp location and date of the end of camp are engraved on the back of the medallion.

The Prometheus Camp Association also arranges special camps where the program emphasis or location differs from typical Prometheus camps. In 2009, two theater camps, two visual arts camps and a hiking camp were organized. Adult campers are also accommodated, and adult camps (for campers past the age of 20) are organized every year.

== Prometheus camps in literature ==
In popular literature, the events of the novel Kipinä (2006), or Spark by Salla Simukka, take place at a Prometheus camp.

== See also ==
- Camp Quest
