= Futrell =

Futrell is a surname. Notable people with the surname include:

- Mike Futrell (born 1960), American attorney and former Louisiana state representative
- Junius Marion Futrell (1870–1955), Arkansas politician
- Bobby Futrell (1962–1992), American football player
- Mynga Futrell (born 1944), American activist
