= Jason Torpy =

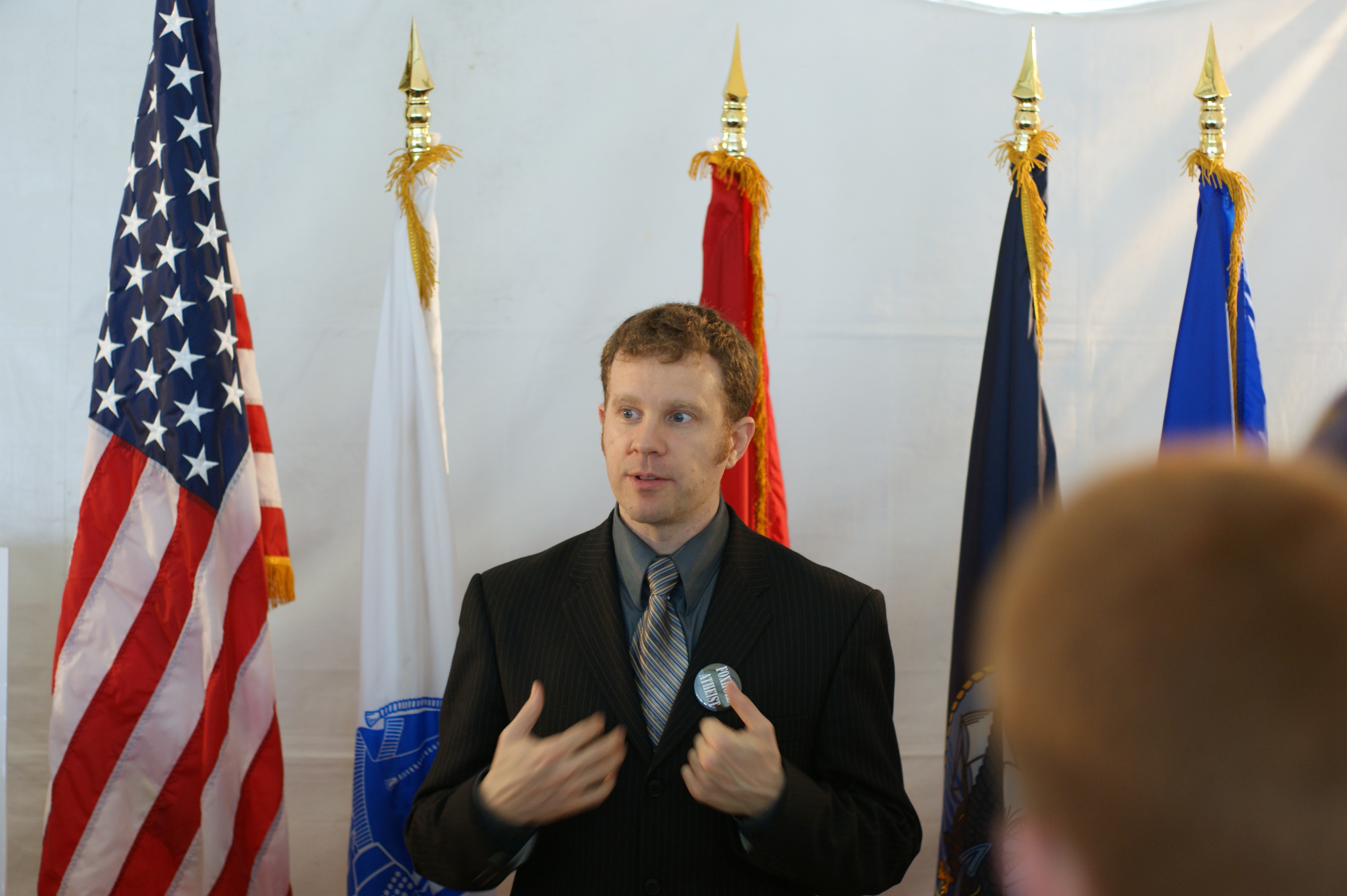
- MAAF President Jason Torpy at Reason Rally 2012
- Born: Jason Daniel Torpy
- Known for: President of the Military Association of Atheists and Freethinkers

Jason Daniel Torpy is president of the Military Association of Atheists and Freethinkers (MAAF), an advocacy group focused on non-religious service members and veterans. He is a veteran of the U.S. Army and a Humanist Celebrant who works to increase the visibility of "atheists in foxholes".

== Background ==
Torpy enlisted in the U.S. Army in 1994 and left the service in 2005 at the rank of captain. He earned his commission through the United States Military Academy at West Point in 2000, and he served with the Army's 1st Armored Division in Germany, Kuwait, and Iraq.

Critics consider Torpy and his advocacy group to be outsiders, frequently describing Torpy as a "perpetually offended" atheist, and framing his advocacy for under-represented non-religious groups as an attack on the free exercise of religion. Torpy cites his experiences in the Army and at West Point, when superiors "responded with indifference or hostility" to individuals or groups who did not profess religious beliefs.

Torpy argues that while the numbers of Christian evangelical service members and of non-religious members are about the same (roughly 20% of the military population) there is a clear preference for funding and providing services for the former while attempts to provide the same services for the latter are refused.

== Activities ==
Through his own organization and partnered with others, Torpy has seen some progress toward his stated goals of gaining acceptance and support for non-religious service members and veterans. The Army invited him to address its 12th-annual Diversity Leadership Conference at West Point in 2012, and the U.S. Army approved a major's request to list humanism as his religious preference for the first time in April 2014. Meanwhile, the Navy denied the application of humanist chaplain candidate Jason Heap, who was sponsored by the Humanist Society and by MAAF.
