= Camp Quest =

Children's humanist summer camp

- Formation: 1996
- Founders: Edwin Kagin, Helen Kagin, Ed McAndrews, Elizabeth Oldiges, Nikki Orlemann, David Scheidt and Vern Uchtman
- Founded at: Boone County, Kentucky
- Type: Non Governmental Organization
- Legal status: Incorporated company
- Headquarters: Staunton, Virginia
- Website: www.campquest.org

Camp Quest is an organisation providing humanist residential summer camps for children in the United States, the United Kingdom, Switzerland and Norway. It was first held in 1996 in Kentucky to provide an alternative to the traditional religiously affiliated summer camps, for the children of nontheistic, humanist or freethinking families as well as children from a religious upbringing. Camp Quest currently consists of 13 affiliated camp groups and its current executive director is Kim Newton.

== Formation ==
In 1995, at a meeting of the Council for Secular Humanism (CSH) in Amherst, New York, in response to the exclusion of non-religious children from the Boy Scouts of America and their camps, the idea for a secular summer camp for children of non-theistic and atheist families was proposed. Edwin Kagin, attending the meeting as a representative of the Free Inquiry Group of Greater Cincinnati and Northern Kentucky (FIG), brought the idea back to FIG and the group determined to actually do it, the planning committee chaired by Vern Uchtman. Kagin was selected to become the camp's first director due to his having been an Eagle Scout when younger. Kagin's wife Helen Kagin and other members of FIG also took various roles at the camp. The name Camp Quest was chosen, the letters representing "Question, Understand, Explore, Search, Test". The Morse Code for CQ (wireless call for "Seek You') also became a symbol on caps and shirts for the camp. Financial support was provided by CSH. On August 11, 1996, the first camp took place in premises owned by Bullittsburg Baptist Church in Boone County, Kentucky, with 20 children attending from five states.

In 1999 Camp Quest moved to a nearby YMCA camp in Ohio, Camp Kern, at which the Northern Kentucky Baptist Association then sought the legal right to restrict the use of their campgrounds based on religious beliefs. At their request, then-Kentucky Representative Tom Kerr sponsored legislation (House Bill 70) exempting religious organizations from anti-discrimination requirements of public accommodation laws. His legislation was not successful and the bill was passed over in 2000.

== Camp Quest Inc. ==
In 2000 Camp Quest expanded with independent camps operating across the United States with the same mission statement, becoming Camp Quest Inc., an independent educational non-profit organization, in 2007 with Fred Edwords as its first president. Camp Quest Inc. now serves as an umbrella group for all Camp Quest affiliates in North America. Edwin and Helen Kagin continued as co-directors of the original Camp Quest based in Ohio until their retirement in 2005. The original Camp Quest moved to 4-H Camp Graham in Clarksville, Ohio, its current location.

The first affiliated group to begin operating a second Camp Quest summer camp session was the Rationalists of East Tennessee, which hosted its first camp session in Tennessee under the name Camp Quest of the Smoky Mountains in 2002.

in 2009 Camp Quest expanded outside North America with Camp Quest UK launching in the United Kingdom. The current Camp Quest UK director, Samantha Stein, became a volunteer for the organisation at a camp in Michigan and was prompted to start a camp in the UK with a group of volunteers. The first UK camp was supported by a grant from the Richard Dawkins Foundation for Reason and Science, and was held in Somerset. Stein fielded a considerable amount of press interest when the Sunday Times broadsheet newspaper ran a front-page article on Camp Quest UK with the headline 'Dawkins sets up kids’ camp to groom atheists'. The Times later went on to include it in their Best kids camps in Britain and 10 best kids' adventure holidays. CQUK also received support from the Humanists UK.

Camp Quest Norway launched in 2011 followed by Camp Quest Switzerland in 2013. Camp Quest Ireland was held as a two-day gathering in Dublin in 2010.

== Programs and activities ==
Most camps' activities include traditional summer camp events: campfires, singing, crafts, games, swimming, canoeing and archery. Other activities explore science and nature and might include meteorology, astronomy, evolution or building rockets. Campers are also encouraged to explore mythology and philosophy, including discussing ethics in a camp version of Socrates Cafe. Campers might also learn American Sign Language, do drama or learn to build a radio. All the programs aim to introduce campers between the age of 8 and 17 to critical thinking, logic and freethought.

As of 2017 Camp Quest has expressed that it will not segregate activities by gender and has introduced policies to accommodate non binary gender and transgender campers and staff.

=== Invisible unicorn challenge ===
During Camp Quest attendees are tasked with the invisible unicorn challenge, aimed at showing that a negative cannot be proven. The task is one of the ways used to encourage children to exercise logic and explore ideas about the burden of proof and challenges the children to prove that invisible unicorns do not exist. The children are told that two invisible unicorns exist at Camp Quest and that there is a valuable book proving their existence which has been passed from generation to generation but no one is allowed to read. Any camper who can prove that the unicorns do not exist will win a godless one-hundred dollar bill (issued before 1957, the year the U.S. Congress mandated that "In God We Trust" be printed on American fiat currency). In the UK the prize is a £10 note signed by Richard Dawkins. Since first offering this challenge in August 1996, the prize remains unclaimed.

International branches:

- Camp Quest UK (July 2009)
- Camp Quest Ireland (Held in 2010)
- Camp Quest Norway (July 2011)
- Camp Quest Schweiz (August 2013) in Switzerland.

== See also ==
- Invisible Pink Unicorn
- Kibbo Kift
- Order of Woodcraft Chivalry
- Prometheus camps
- Scouting
- Wandervogel
- The Woodcraft Folk
