= Rebecca Hensler =

Rebecca

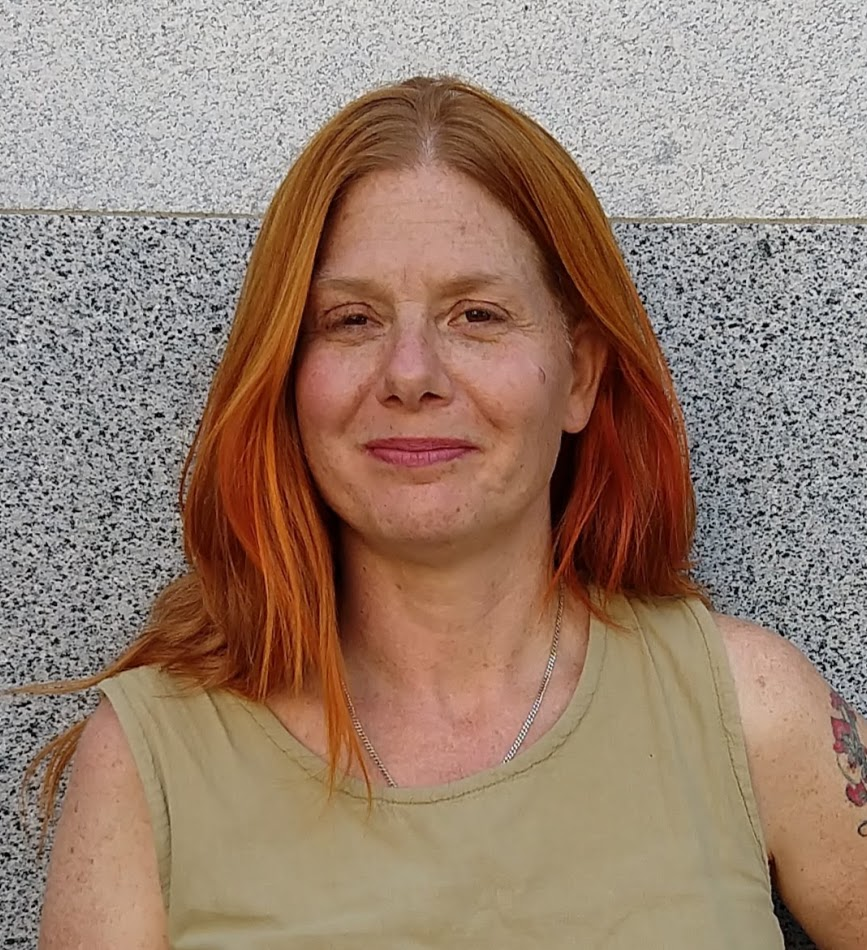
- Born: Los Angeles, California, U.S.

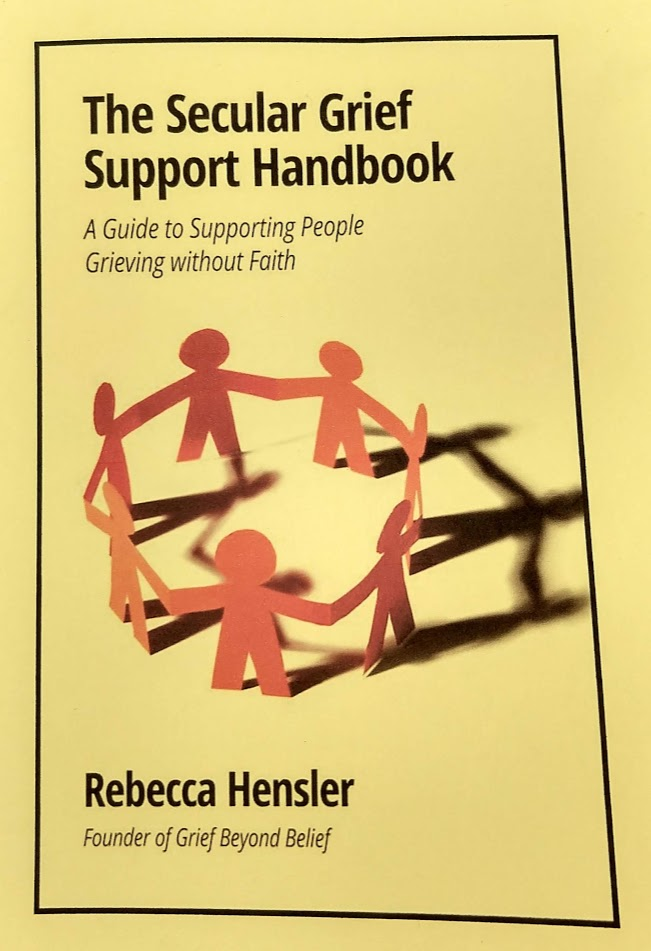

Rebecca Hensler (born 1969) is an American educator, LGBTQ+ activist and founder of secular grief-support community Grief Beyond Belief.

== Early life and education ==
Hensler was born in the city of Los Angeles, and spent her childhood and teenage years there. Her mother Deborah Hensler, currently the Judge John W. Ford Professor of Dispute Resolution at Stanford Law School, worked at the RAND Corporation during Hensler's childhood. She and her brother attended private school following the passing of Proposition 13 in 1978. She has characterized her education up until 7th grade as "progressive" and "experimental"; in 7th grade Hensler began attending "Los Angeles' oldest and most conservative girls' prep school". She realized she was bisexual in her junior year of high school.

Hensler attended Brown University beginning in 1986, where she became involved in LGBT groups and activism on campus. She graduated in 1991.

== Activism ==
Hensler's first forays into activism were in the 1980s, when she attended a march in support of the Equal Rights Amendment. She later also attended a protest following Ronald Reagan's reelection in 1984. She attended the 1987 Second National March on Washington for Lesbian and Gay Rights with a group of Brown University students. She was arrested for the first time during a protest in front of the Supreme Court several days after the march.

In 2015, Hensler expressed support for ongoing black civil rights protests in California, comparing them to the activism she had participated in the 1990s.

=== HIV/AIDS activism ===
Hensler joined ACT UP Los Angeles, and moved to San Francisco in August 1988, where she joined early meetings of ACT UP San Francisco. In October 1993, she participated in a protest at the state capitol in an attempt to "deliver the ashes of AIDS victims to the governor's desk". She left the organization when new leaders that discouraged HIV testing and medications took over.

By 1998, Hensler was involved with Mobilization Against AIDS.

=== Grief activism ===
She founded the social media and internet support group "Grief Beyond Belief" for grieving people who do not believe in God or an afterlife in 2011. She was encouraged to found it by atheist activist Greta Christina. Hensler's infant son, Nathaniel Judah Hensler, also called Jude, died in 2009 at 90 days due to a congenital diaphragmatic hernia. Hensler also published a book called The Secular Grief Support Handbook.

== Personal life ==
Hensler has a BA in political activism and a MS in counseling. She works as a school counselor at a public middle school in San Francisco, and lives in the Bay Area with her wife, whom she married in 2013. In 2014, she was appointed dean of James Denman Middle School.

Hensler has multiple sclerosis and is openly bisexual.
