= Edwin Kagin =

American lawyer (1940–2014)

- Edwin and Helen Kagin their last year as Camp Directors at Camp Quest.
- Born: November 26, 1940; Greenville, South Carolina, United States
- Died: March 28, 2014 (aged 73); Union, Kentucky, United States
- Education: J.D. (University of Louisville)
- Spouse: Helen McGregor Kagin

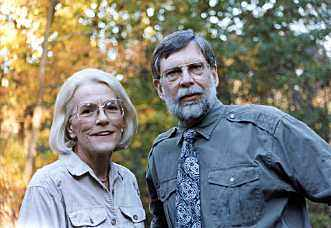
Helen and Edwin Kagin in the 1990s

Edwin Frederick Kagin (November 26, 1940 – March 28, 2014) was an attorney at law in Union, Kentucky, and a founder of Camp Quest, the first secular summer camp in the United States for the children of secularists, atheists, agnostics, brights, skeptics, naturalists and freethinkers. He served as the National Legal Director of American Atheists from 2006 until his death in 2014.

== Personal life ==
Edwin Kagin was born in Greenville, South Carolina, to a Presbyterian minister father who had been born in Kentucky and a Daughters of the American Revolution mother who had been born in South Carolina. His ancestry was German Calvinist on his father's side and Scottish Calvinist Presbyterian on his mother's—both sides boasting numerous clerics.

In youth Kagin became an Eagle Scout. In early adulthood he served in the United States Air Force as a medic in London, England, and received an Honorable Discharge in 1962. He then attended The College of Wooster in Wooster, Ohio; Park College in Parkville, Missouri; and the University of Missouri–Kansas City. At the University of Louisville School of Law in Louisville, Kentucky, he earned his Juris Doctor.

He was married to Helen McGregor Kagin, a Canadian of Scottish descent from Regina, Saskatchewan, who was a retired anesthesiologist. Helen died on February 17, 2010, following complications from cancer surgery.

He died in 2014 at the age of 73 at his home in Union, Kentucky.

== Career and activism ==
Kagin worked for a time as a college English instructor and served as editor of the American Association of Mental Deficiency and National Institute for Mental Health project that created the Adaptive Behavior Scale, an instrument for the assessment of intellectual disability. But the larger part of his career was as an attorney, sometimes focusing on civil liberties and constitutional issues.

After abandoning belief in Christianity, Kagin became a freethought activist. He was a founding member in 1991 of the Free Inquiry Group, Inc., (FIG) of Greater Cincinnati and Northern Kentucky and served as its vice president.

Through his writings in Fig Leaves, the FIG newsletter, as well as those he published and circulated via the Internet, Kagin gradually became known in wider humanist and freethought circles. This led in 2003 to his authorship of a chapter in Kimberly Blaker's Fundamentals of Extremism: The Christian Right in America and in 2005 to his own book, Baubles of Blasphemy, a collection of some of his often irreverent essays and poetry. In 2003 he was one of the signers of the Humanist Manifesto.

Kagin is the originator and was, for its first decade, Director of Camp Quest, the nation's first residential secular summer camp for children of Atheists and other freethinkers, started in 1996 by FIG. First incorporated in 1996 by Kagin and others as Camp Quest Company, Inc., restructuring was required by 2002. He was then an incorporator, and a founding board member, of Camp Quest, Inc., a national non-profit corporation established in 2002 to operate Camp Quest. In 2005, following ten successful years, he and his wife Helen retired from this venture, after transferring control and management of Camp Quest to other hands. That same year they were named "Atheists of the Year" by American Atheists.

Kagin was also a founder and board member of Recover Resources Center, which provides an alternative addiction recovery program to the religiously oriented Alcoholics Anonymous. He served on the national advisory board of the Secular Student Alliance and on January 13, 2006, was named national legal director for American Atheists, replacing the retiring Duane Buchholtz. In 2008, he was elected to the Board of Directors of American Atheists, a position he held until 2013. He was named as "Atheist of the Year" twice, first in 2005 with his wife and again in 2008.

As an outspoken public critic of religious intrusions into government, Kagin was a frequent speaker and debater at local and national events and has appeared on hundreds of radio and television programs, sparring on more than one occasion with Michael Medved. Kagin also ran prominently, albeit unsuccessfully, as "the candidate without a prayer" for the Kentucky Supreme Court (1998) and the Kentucky State Senate (2000). Moreover, some of his legal work involved him in religious issues and church-state separation controversies in addition to other civil liberties and constitutional issues. He was a member of the bar of the U.S. Supreme Court from 1975 until his death.

Kagin was a National Rifle Association of America Certified Handgun Instructor, an honorary Black belt in Kenpo karate, and an honorary Kentucky Colonel. He had four children, Stephen, Eric, Heather, and Kathryn, a stepdaughter, Caroline, and five grandchildren at the time of his death.

== Electoral history ==
1998 general election: Justice of the Kentucky Supreme Court, 6th district
Candidate	Votes	%
Donald C. Wintersheimer	62,336	61.8
Edwin Kagin	38,538	38.2

== Bibliography ==
- Baubles of Blasphemy
- The Fundamentals of Extremism (as contributor)
