= Mynga Futrell =

American Brights activist and science educator

Mynga Futrell (born 1944) is an American activist who cofounded the international constituency of Brights. Her varied pursuits center around civic pluralism (boosting social acceptance, civic engagement and equity for citizens who have supernatural-free worldviews).

== Early life and education ==
Although born in Harlan, Kentucky, Futrell grew up in Kentucky's bluegrass region where her father chaired (1928–1966) the geography-geology department at the local college (now Eastern Kentucky University). For elementary and secondary levels, she attended the campus laboratory school and, after graduating (1962), she pursued undergraduate studies, graduating with a double major in chemistry and earth science (B.S., 1966). Futrell carried out graduate studies (1970–74) at the University of Wyoming. She holds an M.S. (1972) in natural science and a PhD (1974) in curriculum and instruction with a specialization in science education.

== Career and activism ==
Futrell is co-founder (with husband, Paul Geisert) of the Brights movement. She authored the definition of “a bright” and established an international online registry and organizational hub. The nonprofit Brights’ Net encourages persons who have a naturalistic (free-of-supernatural) worldview to be visible and to engage constructively in civic endeavors.

Futrell's freethought activism is marked by her co-founding of several additional nonprofit organizations:

- 1993: Atheists and Other Freethinkers
- 2002: “Freethought Day” (now California Freethought Day)
- 2014: Reason Center

She has served on the boards of directors of the American Humanist Association and the Atheist Alliance and on the advisory board of Americans United for the Separation of Church and State.

An educator at levels of instruction from elementary classroom through university professor, Futrell was a tenured associate professor at Gallaudet University in Washington, DC. She has also co-authored several books including, The Well-Trained Computer: Designing Systematic Instructional Materials for the Classroom Microcomputer (1984), Teachers, Computers, and Curriculum: Microcomputers in the Classroom, and Different Drummers: Nonconforming Thinkers in History (1999).

Activism in the education field includes serving on the advisory council of the California 3Rs (rights, respect, responsibility) religious liberty project for teachers initiated by the First Amendment Center. Futrell developed Worldview Education: Teaching about Religion in Support of Civic Pluralism, a religion-neutral professional web resource for educators.
