= Military Association of Atheists and Freethinkers =

- Formation: 1998
- Purpose: Community, Education, Advocacy
- Location: Washington, D.C.
- President: Jason Torpy
- Website: www.militaryatheists.org

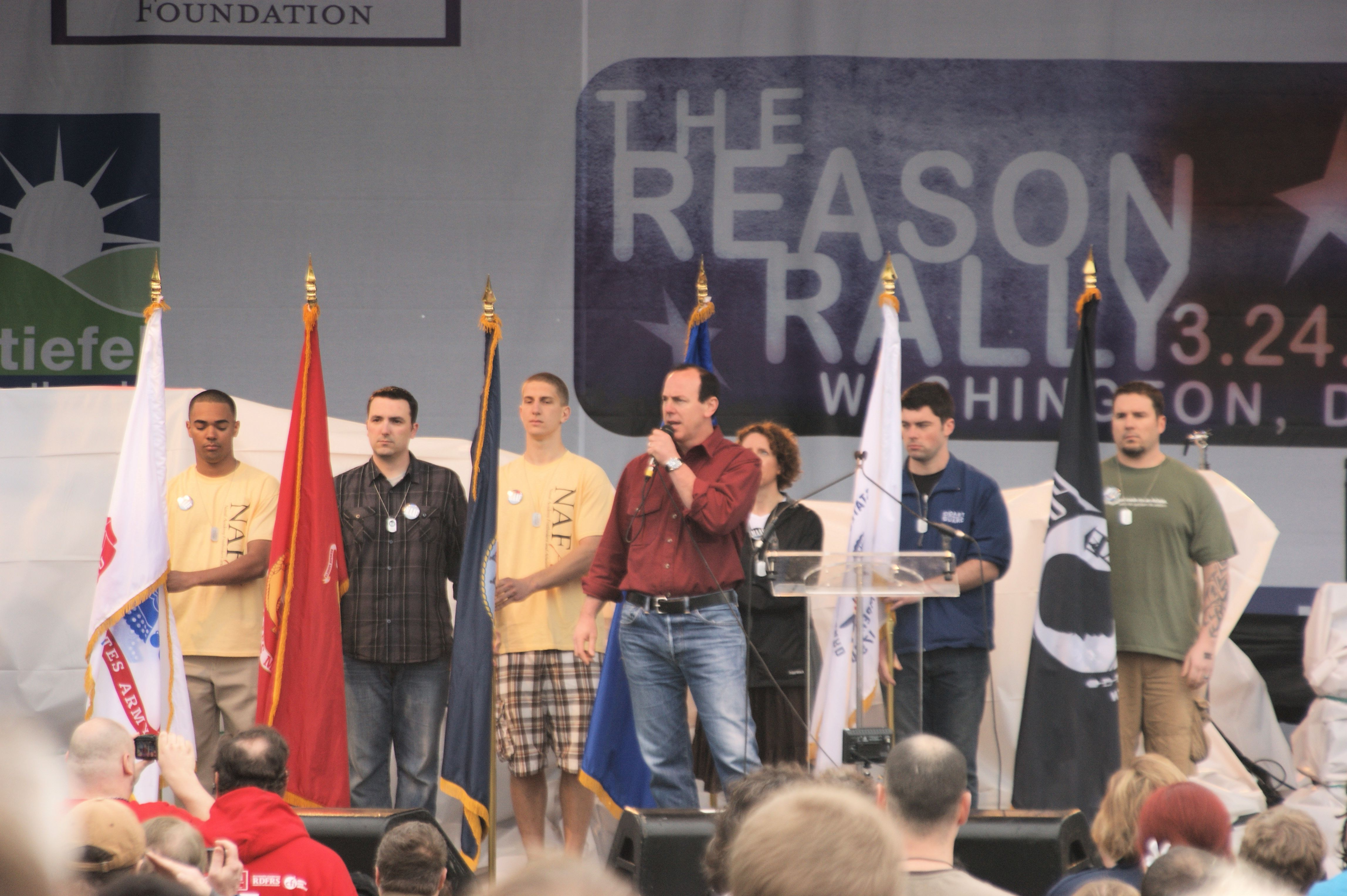
MAAF Color Guard posts the colors as Greg Graffin of Bad Religion sings the National Anthem at the Reason Rally, 24 March 2012, Washington, D.C.

The Military Association of Atheists and Freethinkers (MAAF) is a community for atheists and freethinkers in the military, both within the United States and around the world. The MAAF can help assist U.S. military members to respond to illegal and insensitive religious proselytizing on military bases. It is an independent 501(c)(3) organization building community for freethinkers and other non-theists in the military. The MAAF supports constitutional separation of church and state and First Amendment rights for all service members. It also educates and trains both the military and civilian community about atheism and free thought in the military.

Programs of the MAAF include its local network, with over 70 worldwide points of contact, lay leaders, and local groups from Kyrgyzstan to Japan and throughout the U.S. and its Chaplain Outreach program to educate military chaplains on how to support atheists and freethinkers in the military. Supporting those programs are care package delivery, lay leader and chaplain endorsement, and an advocacy program to identify and resolve issues, to make the military safer for non-theists.

== History ==
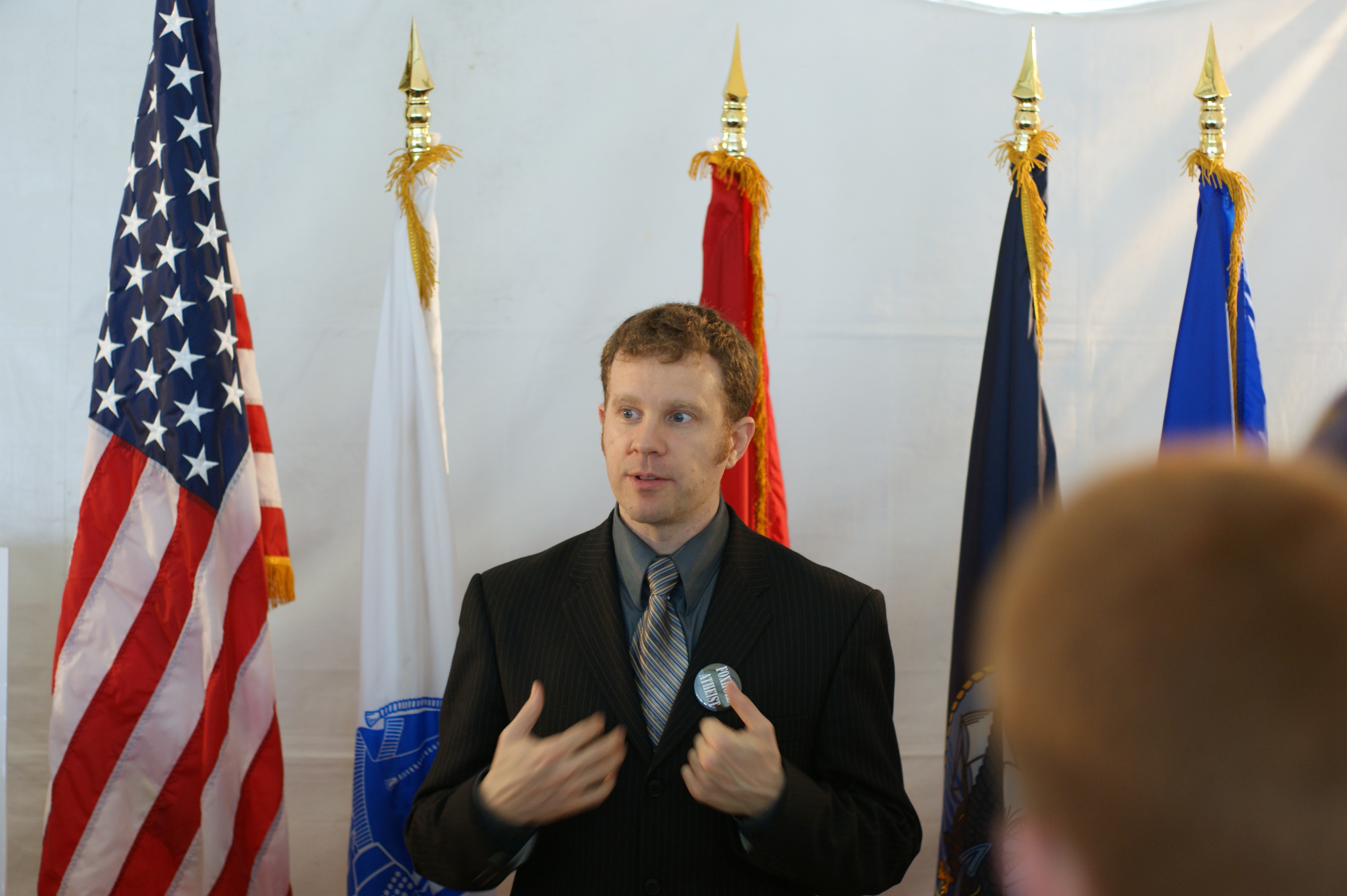
Jason Torpy, President of the Military Association of Atheists and Freethinkers (MAAF) at the Reason Rally held in Washington, D.C., on March 24, 2012

The MAAF was founded with a simple email discussion group in February 1998 by Kathleen Johnson when she was an active-duty sergeant first class with the Army's Criminal Investigative Division (CID). It soon expanded from an online presence and affiliated with other organizations, including American Atheists and the Campus Freethought Alliance (now CFI On Campus). Early membership, totalling just over 100, included several cadets and midshipmen in ROTC programs and military service academies. Jason Torpy, current president, took over in 2001 while still an active-duty officer, established 501(c)(3) status in 2006, and began working full-time for the organization at the end of 2010.

The group's early efforts included letter writing campaigns reminding public figures such as Tom Brokaw not to use the phrase, "There are no atheists in foxholes." One recipient of these letters, broadcaster Bob Schieffer, issued a public apology in response. Other efforts supported active-duty military personnel seeking to include "Atheist" or "Agnostic" on their dog tags instead of the more common "No Rel Pref", which meant the individual had no religious preference. Jason Torpy, who joined MAAF while a cadet at West Point and who is now a former Army captain, now leads a board of five current and retired military officers. As of 2007, he was overseeing an organization of more vocal atheist members, "in 15 countries, 45 states, and over 100 military installations and ships." Other recent efforts of the MAAF include public condemnation of the continued refusal by the Boy Scouts of America to accept nonbelievers. While the BSA claims to be a private organization with a legal right to discriminate, the MAAF calls for an end to federal support in the form of funding and free access to military bases. The MAAF logo includes the three colors Air Force Blue, Army Green, and Navy Blue. It represents the land, sea, and air missions of the group's membership and the three-part mission of providing "atheists in foxholes" with advocacy, community, and education.

In 2011, the MAAF, including its local Fort Bragg Military Association of Secular Humanists (MASH) affiliate, took on the Army's Comprehensive Soldier Fitness program for its take on spiritual fitness as a major factor in soldier readiness. Both Jason Torpy and Justin Griffith, now military director with American Atheists, argued that the Army's approach, and especially the Army's Spiritual Fitness website, were unfairly and illegally sectarian, supporting Christianity over all other religious beliefs. When the overall fitness of Justin Griffith was questioned because of his score on the Spiritual Fitness portion, he took his complaint to the Military Religious Freedom Foundation (MRFF) and threatened legal action against this unconstitutional religious test. Although no major changes were made as a result of the complaints, the Army did remove a section from the Spiritual Fitness website which equated the military flag folding tradition with Christian religious tenets. The MAAF maintains a running review of violations and plans to turn its attention to new Spiritual Triage and Moral Injury applications of "spirituality".

Confirmed to be several thousand, the current membership of MAAF is not publicly specified, but the group's list of "Atheists in Foxholes" has topped 200 who wish to be publicly identified. More certain are the numbers of nonbelievers in the United States military in comparison to the number of chaplains of similar belief. In July 2012, the MAAF published demographics from the United States Department of Defense that confirmed that atheists and agnostics in military ranks far outnumber several other groups, such as Hindus, Jews, Muslims, and Buddhists, yet have no representation in the chaplain corps. This same study also showed that evangelical Christians make up an inordinately large proportion of the chaplain corps when compared to the relatively small percentage of military members who hold such beliefs.

== Reception ==
In July 2007, Major Freddy Welborn attended a meeting of atheist service members in Iraq under the umbrella of the MAAF and organized by Army Specialist Jeremy Hall. The Major reportedly forced attendees to stand at attention while he yelled at, berated and humiliated them. The Major accused them of plotting against Christians and threatened them with punishment before shutting down the meeting. Specialist Hall contacted the MAAF for assistance and was referred to the Military Religious Freedom Foundation. In October 2008, Specialist Hall voluntarily withdrew the lawsuit and there is no indication that any action was taken against Major Welborn.

In 2011, an affiliated group, the Fort Bragg MASH, sought reciprocity after an evangelical Christian ministry received military command funding to hold a concert at Fort Bragg, North Carolina. Active-duty Army Sergeant Justin Griffith sought to hold a similar event called Rock Beyond Belief but was initially refused the same level of support. The same group sought the appointment of atheist lay leaders to provide support for the atheist population at the very large Army base. At the same time, Jason Torpy and the MAAF continued efforts to implement humanist chaplains to support the many atheist, agnostics, and humanists on active duty. Senior chaplain officials responded with the argument that atheists were not a religious group and thus did not qualify for such duty. MAAF responded that humanist chaplains would do everything religious chaplains do, including counsel troops and help them follow their faiths. "Humanism fills the same role for atheists that Christianity does for Christians and Judaism does for Jews," Torpy said in an interview. "It answers questions of ultimate concern; it directs our values."

In October 2012, the United States Army invited Torpy to speak at its twelfth annual Diversity Leadership conference at West Point. At this meeting, he made his pitch for the addition of atheist or humanist chaplains. Included in the argument was that the current chaplain corps is overly representative of the evangelical Christian faith along with a claim that atheist and others were being ignored.

== Criticism ==
The MAAF created some controversy in 2012 when Jason Torpy sought to remove a group of memorial crosses from a hilltop at Camp Pendleton, California. A set of three 13-foot (4 meter) wooden crosses erected by a small group of Marines in 2003 had stood without controversy until a news story caught the attention of the MAAF. After threatening a lawsuit claiming violations of church-state separation, the Marine Corps Commandant was forced to decide whether it would stay or go. "This wasn't intended to be a religious memorial, it was just intended to be able to provide a fitting and a dignified memorial to their fallen comrades and frankly controversy was the very last thing on their minds." said retired Marine Colonel Nick Marano. "Marines and others who continue to come here to reflect will be sorry to see them go." MAAF addressed a long list of common concerns to distinguish its position from some of the attacks levied by opposition groups.

== See also ==
- American Atheists
- American Humanist Association
- Center for Inquiry
- Military Religious Freedom Foundation
