= Mandisa Thomas =

Founder and president of Black Nonbelievers Inc.

- Thomas at Dragon Con in 2026
- Born: Jamaica, Queens, New York
- Citizenship: American
- Education: Queens College, City University of New York
- Occupation: activist
- Years active: 2011–present

Notes
- Voice of Mandisa Thomas

Mandisa Lateefah Thomas is the founder and president of Black Nonbelievers Inc. She has spoken at secular conferences and events, and has promoted the group's agenda in media outlets.

== Early life and background ==
Thomas's upbringing was in a nonreligious, single-parent household, but she describes her grandmother as "staunchly religious". At the age of twenty-one, Thomas moved with her husband to Atlanta, where cultural factors made it difficult to lead a secular life. This experience led her to found Black Nonbelievers.

She considers religion, and Christianity in particular, to have been ingrained into the African-American identity by force.

== Activism ==
Thomas spoke at the 2013 National Convention of American Atheists. That same year she organized the Blackout Secular Rally in New York, the United States' first outdoor event headlined by nontheists of color, and the first secular rally celebrating racial diversity. She credits Ayanna Watson with helping develop the idea after the success of the 2012 Reason Rally.

In 2017, Thomas was recognized by name in a bill (SCR-79) introduced by state Senator Richard Pan, and adopted by the California State Senate, proclaiming October 15, 2017 as the 16th annual celebration of California Freethought Day.

Thomas has made interview appearances in media outlets including CBS News, WABE FM 90.1's Closer Look,, NPR's Code Switch podcast, and the Freedom From Religion Foundation's Freethought Radio program. She has been profiled in publications including Jet magazine and Playboy, and has written opinion pieces for outlets including CNN. Her acting credits include The Mythicist Milwaukee Show, as well as the documentaries Contradiction (2013), Racial Taboo (2013), and My Week in Atheism (2014).

=== Black Nonbelievers ===
Thomas founded Black Nonbelievers, Inc. in 2011, as a non-profit, secular fellowship. Its goals include eliminating stigma, increasing visibility, and providing support and networking opportunities around non-belief in the African-American community. The organization's leadership is mostly female, and includes LGBTQ representation, and it has chapters in ten U.S. cities. It partners with other secular organizations including African Americans for Humanism, Openly Secular and the Freedom From Religion Foundation.

In March 2018, in order to devote herself full-time to activism within Black Nonbelievers and the broader secular community, Thomas resigned from her full-time position as event services manager at the Centers for Disease Control and Prevention's conference center.

== Alleged misconduct and aftermath ==
On December 5, 2022, leaders from five chapters of Black Nonbelievers (chapters in Detroit, Louisville in Kentucky, Portland in Oregon, New York, and Washington, D.C.) put out a statement saying they were ending their involvement with Thomas and with Black Nonbelievers. The statement mentioned “events that culminated horribly” during a cruise and conference attended shortly before by members of Black Nonbelievers. Thomas stated that during the conference she had mishandled a “personal situation” and that she had “acknowledged my responsibility for how it had been handled,” adding “I apologized to some individuals and took corrective action for the rest of the cruise.”

On December 16, 2022, the board of the American Humanist Association released the following statement: “The Board of Directors of the American Humanist Association received a communication on behalf of an AHA chapter with concerns regarding Mandisa Thomas, a member of the AHA Board. The AHA Board has discussed the information provided and has resolved to look into the matter completely and thoroughly in line with the values of our organization. As the Board considers the matter, Mandisa has taken a leave of absence and withdrawn from all responsibilities at the AHA, including participation in the AHA Board, with immediate effect.”

On December 19, 2022, the American Atheists Board Chairperson Jennifer Scott announced that the board had “been made aware of concerns raised in a public letter by former members and affiliates of Black Nonbelievers regarding the conduct of” Thomas, and that “In keeping with our internal policies, our board ethics committee and members of leadership have begun the process of reaching out to those individuals and to Ms. Thomas.” On January 11, 2023, Thomas released the following statement: “After careful thought and consideration, I have informed my colleagues on the American Atheists Board of Directors that I would be taking time to focus on my work at Black Nonbelievers and resigning from my position on the board. It has been an honor to serve as a member of this organization’s board and to collaborate so closely with these amazing activists — and friends — who work so tirelessly to advance the cause of atheism in America.”

== Awards and honors ==
In 2018, the Unitarian Universalist Humanist Association named Thomas its Person of the Year. In 2019 the Secular Student Alliance presented her with its Backbone Award. Thomas received the Harvard Humanist of the Year Award from the American Humanist Association in 2020, alongside Sikivu Hutchinson and Ijeoma Oluo.

== Personal life ==
Thomas and her husband, also an atheist, have three children and reside in suburban Atlanta, Georgia.
