= Fred Edwords =

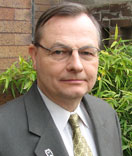
- Fred Edwords
- Born: July 19, 1948 (age 77); San Diego, California, U.S.
- Occupations: Humanist leader, activist, nonprofit executive, writer
- Years active: 1970s–present
- Known for: Leadership in American Humanist Association, United Coalition of Reason, Camp Quest
- Spouse: Mary Carroll Murchison-Edwords (m. 1980)
- Children: 2

Fred Edwords, born July 19, 1948, in San Diego, California, is an agnostic or ignostic humanist leader in Washington DC.

== Biography ==
Edwords has worked with the American Humanist Association in several capacities. From 1980 to 1984 he was national administrator, then executive director from 1984 to 1999 and editor of the American Humanist Association's magazine, the Humanist, from 1995 to 2006. Edwords was also editor of the association's membership newsletter Free Mind from 2002 to 2006 and the Creation/Evolution journal from 1980 to 1991. He later worked as director of planned giving for their endowment fund, the Humanist Foundation.

Edwords was national director of the United Coalition of Reason from 2009 to 2015, president of Camp Quest, Inc., from 2002 to 2005, and on the staff of the Ohio camp from 1998 to 2008. He was also vice president of the North American Committee for Humanism from 1990 to 1992 and president of the Humanist Association of San Diego in 1978. He has served on the boards of the International Humanist and Ethical Union (1986–1999), the New York Council for Evolution Education (1982–1994), and the National Center for Science Education (1982–1992). He was chair of the American Humanist Association's Humanist Manifesto III Drafting Committee from 2002 to 2003. On August 7, 1985, he became a co-plaintiff in the successful U.S. District Court lawsuit, Asimov v. United States, against the U.S. Department of Education, brought by the National Emergency Civil Liberties Committee. As of 2019, Edwords was one of the plaintiffs in a case that started in 2014 as American Humanist Association et al v. Maryland-National Capital Park and Planning Commission, a federal lawsuit on appeal to the U.S. Supreme Court that is aimed at removing a 40 foot tall Latin cross on public property in Bladensburg, Maryland.

Edwords was named Rationalist of the Year by the American Rationalist Federation in 1984, received the Humanist Pioneer Award of the American Humanist Association in 1986, was named a HumCon Pioneer by the Alliance of Humanist, Atheist, and Ethical Culture Organizations of Los Angeles County in 1992., received the Humanist Heritage Award of the Humanist Foundation in 2014, and received the Lifetime Achievement Award from the American Humanist Association.

Edwords has also served on the adjunct faculty of the Humanist Institute, is a Humanist Celebrant Emeritus with the Humanist Society, and served from 2010 through 2018 on the Human Origins Initiative's Broader Social Impacts Committee at the Smithsonian National Museum of Natural History.

He has been married to Mary Carroll Murchison-Edwords since June 1980. The couple has two children, both now adults.

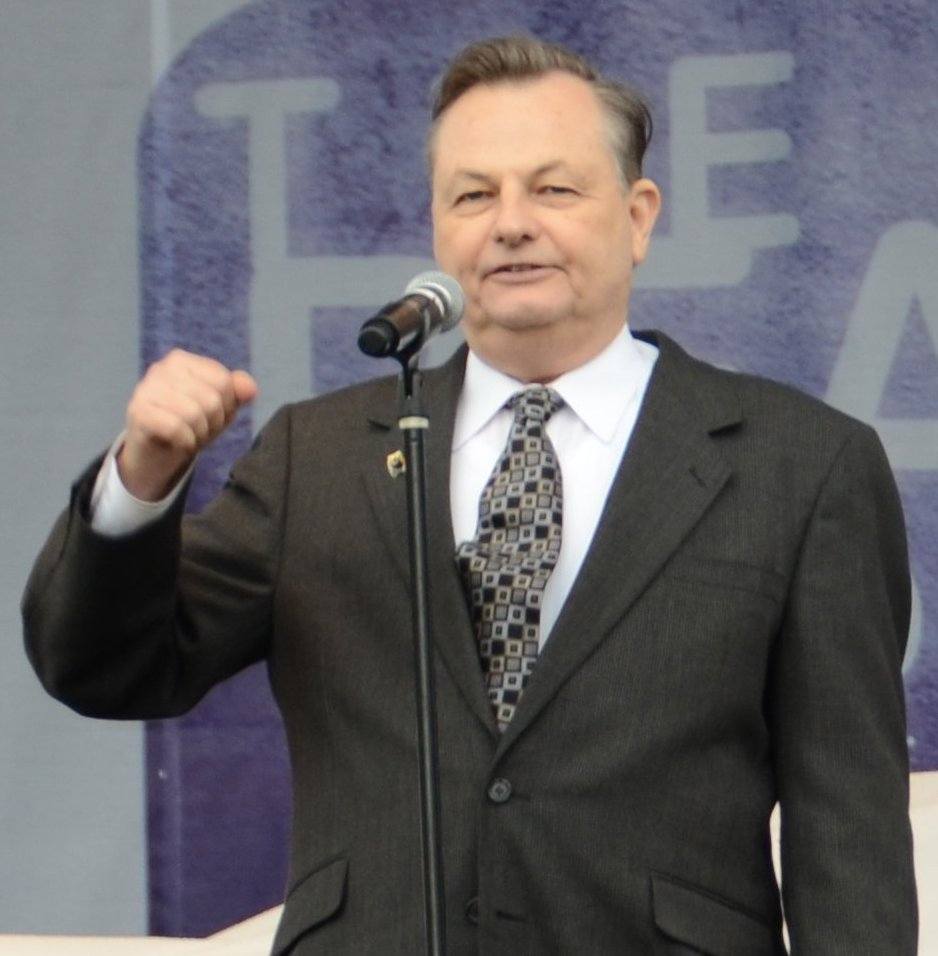
At Reason Rally Washington D.C. March 23, 2012
