= There are no atheists in foxholes =

Expression that high-stress situations prompt everyone to believe in god

"There are no atheists in foxholes" is an aphorism used to suggest that times of extreme stress or fear can prompt belief in a higher power. In the context of actual warfare, such a sudden change in belief has been called a foxhole conversion. The logic of the argument is also used to argue for the opposite, that stress and fear can cause an individual to question their belief.

== Origin ==
The statement is an aphorism used to argue that people will believe in, or hope for, a higher power in times of fear or stress, such as during war ("in foxholes"). The origin of the quotation is uncertain. The U.S. military chaplain William Thomas Cummings may have said it in a field sermon during the Battle of Bataan in 1942, though scholars have been unable to find a firsthand witness to the sermon. Other sources credit Lieutenant Colonel Warren J. Clear (or the anonymous sergeant he spoke with there), who was also at Bataan and published the usage in 1942; or Lieutenant Colonel William Casey. The phrase is often attributed to war correspondent Ernie Pyle; however, no such source published prior to Pyle's death is known. It was also quoted by President Dwight D. Eisenhower in remarks broadcast from the White House as part of a February 7, 1954, American Legion Program. With slightly different wording, the statement appears much earlier in press reports dating from the end of the First World War, while a similar concept has been sought in Plato's Laws, and in Karl Marx's often-misrepresented (Note: Karl Marx's quote is only quoted in part as the interpretation of the metaphor in its context has received much less attention.) partial quote that "Religion is the sigh of the oppressed creature, the heart of a heartless world, and the soul of soulless conditions. It is the opium of the people".

== Usage ==
Although the adage occasionally means that all soldiers in combat are "converted" under fire, it is most often used to express the belief of the speaker that all people seek a divine power when they are facing an extreme threat. The quote is also referenced when discussing the opposite effect—that warfare causes some soldiers to question their existing belief in God due to the death and violence around them.

The quote has also been used in non-military contexts. In September 2008, during the 2008 financial crisis, both Ben Bernanke and Paul Krugman popularized a version of the quote in reference to financial crises. They paraphrased Harvard professor Jeffrey Frankel, who originally wrote in the Cato Journal a year earlier, "They say 'there are no atheists in foxholes.' Perhaps, then, there are also no libertarians in crises." The sentence is also quoted in the Gustav Hasford's novel The Short-Timers. The quote has been used by but commonly misattributed to economist Paul Krugman.

== Criticism ==
The broad subject of the various contradictions that have been historically formulated around the concept of divinity (within which one might argue that it is the gods who put soldiers in the foxholes in the first place) is examined specifically within the field of theodicy. Several atheist organizations object to the phrase. The Military Association of Atheists & Freethinkers has adopted the catchphrase "Atheists in Foxholes" to criticize the aphorism. Author James K. Morrow said: "That maxim, 'There are no atheists in foxholes,' it's not an argument against atheism — it's an argument against foxholes." In 2015, describing the phrase as a "tired, old, untrue cliché", the Freedom from Religion Foundation erected a monument to "Atheists in Foxholes", commemorating American atheist, agnostic, freethinking and skeptical U.S. armed services veterans.
