= Mel Lipman =

American lawyer (1936–2019)

Melvin S. Lipman, a.k.a. Mel Lipman (1936-2019 Brooklyn, New York) was an attorney, civil libertarian and humanist (nontheist/atheist) activist.

He was a retired bank auditor, arbitrator, mediator and college instructor, having taught Constitutional Law and US History at several Las Vegas colleges.

He frequently lectured on Church/State separation issues and his participation in interfaith forums provided him with the opportunity to clarify the Humanist perspective. In a Las Vegas Review-Journal article, Lipman stated: "My biggest concern is to counter the propaganda from people who think that people who don't believe in a supernatural deity cannot live moral, ethical lives." Lipman said his top priority "is to change people's attitudes about Humanists". "It is not OK", said Lipman, in the Review-Journal article, "to discriminate against somebody simply because they do not believe in God".

Lipman was the immediate past president of the American Humanist Association and remained active in many of its activities. He was a trustee and treasurer of The Humanist Foundation (the American Humanist Association's endowment fund) and was a co-mentor of the 2012 class of the Humanist Institute.

He was a former vice-president of the International Humanist and Ethical Union and was one of the founders, a past president, and a board member of the Humanist Association of Las Vegas and Southern Nevada.

He was a life member of Freedom From Religion Foundation and the American Humanist Association.

Lipman was a past president and former member of the Unitarian Universalist Congregation of Las Vegas and he was a "fellow" at the Unitarian Universalist Humanist Symposium.

Though raised in the Jewish faith, he became a humanist minister, licensed in Nevada to officiate at marriage ceremonies and he was a board member of the Interfaith Council of Southern Nevada.

He was a former board member of the Nevada Civil Liberties Union and served as an advisory board member of Scouting for All.

Mr. Lipman lived in Las Vegas, Nevada, was married to Anita Lipman, and had two children and three grandchildren.

His daughter, Lori Lipman Brown is a former member of the Nevada State Senate, former director of the Secular Coalition for America, and was co-mentor (with Mel Lipman) of the Humanist Institute class of 2012.

== References and external links ==
- Biography at the American Humanist Association
