= Creation and evolution in public education in the United States =

Debate in American schools

In American schools, the Genesis creation narrative was generally taught as the origin of the universe and of life until Darwin's scientific theories became widely accepted. While there was some immediate backlash, organized opposition did not get underway until the Fundamentalist–Modernist controversy broke out following World War I; several states passed laws banning the teaching of evolution while others debated them but did not pass them. The Scopes trial was the result of a challenge to the law in Tennessee. John T. Scopes lost his case, and further U.S. states passed laws banning the teaching of evolution.

In 1968, the U.S. Supreme Court ruled on Epperson v. Arkansas, another challenge to these laws, and the court ruled that allowing the teaching of creation, while disallowing the teaching of evolution, advanced a religion, and therefore violated the Establishment Clause of the U.S. Constitution. Creationists then starting lobbying to have laws passed that required teachers to Teach the Controversy, but this was also struck down by the Supreme Court in 1987 in Edwards v. Aguillard. Creationists then moved to frame the issue as one of intelligent design but this too was ruled against in a District Court in Kitzmiller v. Dover Area School District in 2005.

The issue has remained contentious, with various U.S. states debating, passing, or voting down alternative approaches to creationism in science classrooms. There is no bar in U.S. law to creationism being taught in civics, current affairs, philosophy, or comparative religion classes.

== Early law ==
Until the late 19th century, the Genesis creation narrative was taught in nearly all schools in the United States, often from the position that the literal interpretation of the Bible is inerrant. With the widespread acceptance of the scientific theory of biological evolution in the 1860s after being first introduced in 1859, and developments in other fields such as geology and astronomy, public schools began to teach science that was reconciled with Christianity by most people, but considered by a number of early fundamentalists to be directly at odds with the Bible.

In the aftermath of World War I, the Fundamentalist–Modernist Controversy brought a surge of opposition to the idea of biological evolution, and following the campaigning of William Jennings Bryan several states introduced legislation prohibiting the teaching of biological evolution in public schools. Such legislation was considered and defeated in 1922 in Kentucky, and South Carolina, in 1923 passed in Oklahoma, Florida, and notably in 1925 in Tennessee, as the Butler Act. The American Civil Liberties Union (ACLU) offered to defend anyone who wanted to bring a test case against one of these laws. John T. Scopes accepted, and he started teaching his class evolution, in defiance of the Tennessee law. The resulting trial was widely publicized by H. L. Mencken among others, and is commonly referred to as the Scopes Trial. Scopes was convicted; however, the widespread publicity galvanized proponents of evolution.

When the case was appealed to the Tennessee Supreme Court, the Court overturned the decision on a technicality (the judge had assessed the fine when the jury had been required to). Although it overturned the conviction, the Court decided that the law was not in violation of the First Amendment to the United States Constitution. The Court held:

We are not able to see how the prohibition of teaching the theory that man has descended from a lower order of animals gives preference to any religious establishment or mode of worship. So far as we know there is no religious establishment or organized body that has its creed or confession of faith any article denying or affirming such a theory. — John Thomas Scopes v. The State 154 Tenn. 105, 289 S.W. 363 (1927)

The interpretation of the Establishment Clause of the First Amendment up to that time was that Congress could not establish a particular religion as the State religion. Consequently, the Court held that the ban on the teaching of evolution did not violate the Establishment Clause, because it did not establish one religion as the "State religion." As a result of the holding, the teaching of evolution remained illegal in Tennessee, and continued campaigning succeeded in removing evolution from school textbooks throughout the United States.

== Modern legal cases ==
In 1967, the Tennessee public schools were threatened with another lawsuit over the Butler Act's constitutionality, and, fearing public reprisal, Tennessee's legislature repealed the Butler Act. In the following year, the Supreme Court of the United States ruled in Epperson v. Arkansas (1968) that Arkansas's law prohibiting the teaching of evolution was in violation of the First Amendment. The Supreme Court held that the Establishment Clause prohibits the state from advancing any religion, and determined that the Arkansas law which allowed the teaching of creation while disallowing the teaching of evolution advanced a religion, and was therefore in violation of the Establishment Clause. This holding reflected a broader understanding of the Establishment Clause: instead of just prohibiting laws that established a state religion, the clause was interpreted to prohibit laws that furthered any particular religion over others. Opponents, pointing to the previous decision, argued that this amounted to judicial activism.

The Supreme Court of the United States has made several rulings regarding evolution in public education

In reaction to the Epperson case, creationists in Louisiana passed a law requiring that public schools should give "equal time" to "alternative theories" of origin. The Supreme Court ruled in 1987 in Edwards v. Aguillard that the Louisiana statute, which required creation to be taught alongside evolution every time evolution was taught, was unconstitutional.

The Court laid out its rule in Edwards as follows:

The Establishment Clause forbids the enactment of any law 'respecting an establishment of religion.' The Court has applied a three-pronged test to determine whether legislation comports with the Establishment Clause. First, the legislature must have adopted the law with a secular purpose. Second, the statute's principal or primary effect must be one that neither advances nor inhibits religion. Third, the statute must not result in an excessive entanglement of government with religion. Lemon v. Kurtzman, 403 U.S. 602, 612–613, 91 S.Ct. 2105, 2111, 29 L.Ed.2d 745 (1971). State action violates the Establishment Clause if it fails to satisfy any of these prongs. — Edwards v. Aguillard

The Court held that the law was not adopted with a secular purpose, because its purported purpose of "protecting academic freedom" was not furthered by limiting the freedom of teachers to teach what they thought appropriate; ruled that the act was discriminatory because it provided certain resources and guarantees to "creation scientists" which were not provided to those who taught evolution; and ruled that the law was intended to advance a particular religion because several state senators that had supported the bill stated that their support for the bill stemmed from their religious beliefs.

While the Court held that creationism is an inherently religious belief, it did not hold that every mention of creationism in a public school is unconstitutional:

We do not imply that a legislature could never require that scientific critiques of prevailing scientific theories be taught. Indeed, the Court acknowledged in Stone that its decision forbidding the posting of the Ten Commandments did not mean that no use could ever be made of the Ten Commandments, or that the Ten Commandments played an exclusively religious role in the history of Western Civilization. 449 U.S., at 42, 101 S.Ct., at 194. In a similar way, teaching a variety of scientific theories about the origins of humankind to schoolchildren might be validly done with the clear secular intent of enhancing the effectiveness of science instruction. But because the primary purpose of the Creationism Act is to endorse a particular religious doctrine, the Act furthers religion in violation of the Establishment Clause. — Edwards v. Aguillard

== Intelligent Design and Kitzmiller v. Dover Area School District ==
The ruling was one in a series of developments addressing issues related to the American creationist movement and the separation of church and state. The scope of the ruling affected state schools and did not include independent schools, home schools, Sunday schools and Christian schools, all of whom remained free to teach creationism.

Within two years of the Edwards ruling a creationist textbook was produced: Of Pandas and People (1989), which attacked evolutionary biology without mentioning the identity of the supposed "intelligent designer." Drafts of the text used "creation" or "creator" before being changed to "intelligent design" or "designer" after the Edwards v. Aguillard ruling. This form of creationism, known as intelligent design creationism, was developed in the early 1990s.

This would eventually lead to another court case, Kitzmiller v. Dover Area School District, which went to trial on September 26, 2005, and was decided in U.S. District Court on December 20, 2005, in favor of the plaintiffs, who charged that a mandate that intelligent design (ID) be taught was an unconstitutional establishment of religion. The opinion of Kitzmiller v. Dover was hailed as a landmark decision, firmly establishing that creationism and intelligent design were religious teachings and not areas of legitimate scientific research. Because the Dover Area School Board chose not to appeal, the case never reached a circuit court or the U.S. Supreme Court.

Just as it is permissible to discuss the crucial role of religion in medieval European history, creationism may be discussed in a civics, current affairs, philosophy, or comparative religions class where the intent is to factually educate students about the diverse range of human political and religious beliefs. The line is crossed only when creationism is taught as science.

== Movements to teach creationism in schools ==
There continue to be numerous efforts to introduce creationism in U.S. classrooms. One strategy is to declare that evolution is a religion, and therefore it should not be taught in the classroom either, or that if evolution is a religion, then surely creationism as well can be taught in the classroom.

In the 1980s, UC Berkeley law professor Phillip E. Johnson began reading the scientific literature on evolution. This led him to author Darwin on Trial (1991), which examined the evidence for evolution from a religious point of view and challenged the assumption that the only reasonable explanation for the origin of species must be a naturalistic one. This book, and his subsequent efforts to encourage and coordinate creationists with more scientific credentials, was the start of the intelligent design movement. Intelligent design asserts that there is evidence that life was created by an "intelligent designer" (mainly that the physical properties of living organisms are so complex that they must have been "designed"). Proponents claim that intelligent design takes "all available facts" into account rather than just those available through naturalism. Opponents assert that intelligent design is a pseudoscience because its claims cannot be tested by experiment (see falsifiability) and do not propose any new hypotheses.

Many proponents of the intelligent design movement support requiring that it be taught in the public schools. For example, the Discovery Institute (DI), a conservative think tank, and Phillip E. Johnson support the policy of "Teach the Controversy," which entails presenting to students evidence for and against evolution, and then encouraging students to evaluate that evidence themselves.

While many proponents of intelligent design believe that it should be taught in schools, others believe that legislation is not appropriate. Answers in Genesis (AiG) has said:

"AiG is not a lobby group, and we oppose legislation for compulsion of creation teaching. ...why would we want an atheist forced to teach creation and give a distorted view? But we would like legal protection for teachers who present scientific arguments against the sacred cow of evolution such as staged pictures of peppered moths and forged embryo diagrams."

== Position of Teaching and Scientific Societies ==
The National Science Teachers Association is opposed to teaching creationism as a science, as is the Association for Science Teacher Education, the National Association of Biology Teachers, the American Anthropological Association, the American Geosciences Institute, the Geological Society of America, the American Geophysical Union, and numerous other professional teaching and scientific societies.

== Recent developments in state education programs ==
=== Developments by state ===
==== Alabama ====
In 1996, the Alabama State Board of Education adopted a textbook sticker that was a disclaimer about evolution. It has since been revised and moderated. In September 2015, the Alabama State Board of Education unanimously approved that evolution and climate change should be required material for the state educational curriculum, these changes to be implemented by 2016. At the same time, a referendum was set for potentially removing the textbook disclaimers.

==== Arizona ====
In January 2013, it was approved the Arizona's Senate Bill 1213 which enabled teachers of public state schools to discuss "the scientific strengths and scientific weaknesses" of the "teaching of some scientific subjects, including biological evolution, the chemical origins of life, global warming, and human cloning can cause controversy."

==== Arkansas ====
In March 2021, the Arkansas House passed House Bill 1701 by a vote of 72–21, which would have allowed public schools to teach intelligent design. The next month, however, the Arkansas Senate Education Committee rejected it by a vote of 3–3.

==== California ====
In August 2008 Judge S. James Otero ruled in favor of University of California in Association of Christian Schools International v. Roman Stearns agreeing with the university's position that various religious books on U.S. history and science, from A Beka Books and Bob Jones University Press, should not be used for college-preparatory classes. The case was filed in spring 2006 by Association of Christian Schools International (ACSI) against the University of California claiming religious discrimination over the rejection of five courses as college preparatory instruction. On August 8, 2008, Judge Otero entered summary judgment against plaintiff ACSI, upholding the University of California's standards. The university found the books "didn't encourage critical thinking skills and failed to cover 'major topics, themes and components' of U.S. history" and were thus ill-suited to prepare students for college.

==== Florida ====
On February 19, 2008, the Florida State Board of Education adopted new science standards in a 4–3 vote. The new science curriculum standards explicitly require the teaching of the "scientific theory of evolution," whereas the previous standards only referenced evolution using the words "change over time."

==== Georgia ====
In 2002, six parents in Cobb County, Georgia, in the case Selman v. Cobb County School District (2006) sued to have the following sticker removed from public school textbooks:

This textbook contains material on evolution. Evolution is a theory, not a fact, regarding the origin of living things. This material should be approached with an open mind, studied carefully, and critically considered.

Approved by
Cobb County Board of Education

Thursday, March 28, 2002

Defense attorney E. Linwood Gunn IV said, "The only thing the school board did is acknowledge there is a potential conflict [between the science of evolution and creationism] and there is a potential infringement on people's beliefs if you present it in a dogmatic way. We're going to do it in a respectful way." Gerald R. Weber, legal director of the ACLU of Georgia, said, "The progress of church-state cases has been that the [U.S.] Supreme Court sets a line, then government entities do what they can to skirt that line. ... Here the Supreme Court has said you can't teach creationism in the public schools. You can't have an equal-time provision for evolution and creationism. These disclaimers are a new effort to skirt the line." Jefferey Selman, who brought the lawsuit, claims, "It singles out evolution from all the scientific theories out there. Why single out evolution? It has to be coming from a religious basis, and that violates the separation of church and state." The Cobb County Board of Education said it adopted the sticker "to foster critical thinking among students, to allow academic freedom consistent with legal requirements, to promote tolerance and acceptance of diversity of opinion, and to ensure a posture of neutrality toward religion."

On January 13, 2005, a federal judge in Atlanta ruled that the stickers should be removed as they violated the Establishment Clause of the First Amendment. The Board subsequently decided to appeal the decision. In comments on December 15, 2005, in advance of releasing its decision, the appeal court panel appeared critical of the lower court ruling and a judge indicated that he did not understand the difference between evolution and abiogenesis.

On December 19, 2006, the Board abandoned all of its legal activities and will no longer mandate that biology texts contain a sticker stating "evolution is a theory, not a fact." Their decision was a result of compromise negotiated with a group of parents, represented by the ACLU, that were opposed to the sticker. The parents agreed, as their part of the compromise, to withdraw their legal actions against the Board.

==== Kansas ====
On August 11, 1999, by a 6–4 vote the Kansas State Board of Education changed their science education standards to remove any mention of "biological macroevolution, the age of the Earth, or the origin and early development of the universe," so that evolutionary theory no longer appeared in statewide standardized tests and "it was left to the 305 local school districts in Kansas whether or not to teach it." This decision was hailed by creationists, and sparked a statewide and nationwide controversy with scientists condemning the change. Challengers in the state's Republican primary who made opposition to the anti-evolution standards their focus were voted in on August 1, 2000, so on February 14, 2001, the Board voted 7–3 to reinstate the teaching of biological evolution and the origin of the earth into the state's science education standards.

In 2004, the Board elections gave religious conservatives a majority and, influenced by the Discovery Institute, they arranged the Kansas evolution hearings. On August 9, 2005, the Board drafted new "science standards that require critical analysis of evolution – including scientific evidence refuting the theory," which opponents analyzed as effectively stating that intelligent design should be taught. The new standards also provide a definition of science that does not preclude supernatural explanations, and were approved by a 6–4 vote on November 8, 2005—incidentally the day of the Dover Area School Board election which failed to re-elect incumbent creationists (see #Pennsylvania).

In Kansas' state Republican primary elections on August 1, 2006, moderate Republicans took control away from the anti-evolution conservatives, leading to an expectation that science standards which effectively embraced intelligent design and cast doubt on Darwinian evolution would now be changed.

On February 13, 2007, the Board approved a new curriculum which removed any reference to intelligent design as part of science. In the words of Bill Wagnon, the board chairman, "Today the Kansas Board of Education returned its curriculum standards to mainstream science." The new curriculum, as well as a document outlining the differences with the previous curriculum, has been posted on the Kansas State Department of Education's website.

In June 2013, Kansas adopted the national Next Generation Science Standards, which teaches evolution as a fundamental principle of life sciences.

==== Kentucky ====
In October 1999, the Kentucky Department of Education replaced the word "evolution" with "change over time" in state school standards.

==== Louisiana ====
On June 12, 2008, a bill (SB561) named the "Louisiana Academic Freedom Act" passed into law.

==== Ohio ====
In 2002, proponents of intelligent design asked the Ohio State Board of Education to adopt intelligent design as part of its standard biology curriculum, in line with the guidelines of the Edwards v. Aguillard holding. In December 2002, the Board adopted a proposal that required critical analysis of evolution, but did not specifically mention intelligent design. This decision was reversed in February 2006 following both the conclusion of the Dover lawsuit and repeated threats of lawsuit against the Board.

==== Pennsylvania ====
In 2004, the Dover Area School Board voted that a statement must be read to students of 9th grade biology mentioning intelligent design. This resulted in a firestorm of criticism from scientists and science teachers and caused a group of parents to begin legal proceedings (sometimes referred to as the Dover Panda Trial) to challenge the decision, based on their interpretation of the Aguillard precedent. Supporters of the school board's position noted that the Aguillard holding explicitly allowed for a variety of what they consider "scientific theories" of origins for the secular purpose of improving scientific education. Others have argued that intelligent design should not be allowed to use this "loophole." On November 8, 2005, the members of the Board in Dover were voted out and replaced by evolutionary theory supporters. This had no bearing on the case. On December 20, 2005, federal judge John E. Jones III ruled that the Dover Area School Board had violated the Constitution when they set their policy on teaching intelligent design, and stated that "In making this determination, we have addressed the seminal question of whether ID is science. We have concluded that it is not, and moreover that ID cannot uncouple itself from its creationist, and thus religious, antecedents."

==== Tennessee ====
On April 10, 2012, a bill (HB 368/SB 893) passed in protecting "teachers who explore the 'scientific strengths and scientific weaknesses' of evolution and climate change." Science education advocates said the law could make it easier for creationism and global warming denial to enter U.S. classrooms. Brenda Ekwurzel of the Union of Concerned Scientists saw it as a risk to education, quoting "We need to keep kids' curiosity about science alive and not limit their ability to understand the world around them by exposing them to misinformation." The passing of the law was praised by proponents of intelligent design.

==== Texas ====
On November 7, 2007, the Texas Education Agency (TEA) director of science curriculum Christine Comer was forced to resign over an e-mail she had sent announcing a talk given by an anti-intelligent design author. In a memo obtained under the Texas Public Information Act, TEA officials wrote "Ms. Comer's e-mail implies endorsement of the speaker and implies that TEA endorses the speaker's position on a subject on which the agency must remain neutral." In response over 100 biology professors from Texas universities signed a letter to the state education commissioner denouncing the requirement to be neutral on the subject of intelligent design. The 2017 science curriculum eliminated language that openly questioned evolution, but still leaves room for teaching creationism.

In July 2011, the Texas State Board of Education (SBOE), which oversees the Texas Education Agency, did not approve anti-evolution instructional materials submitted by International Databases, LLC, while continuing to approve materials from mainstream publishers.

==== Virginia ====
Despite proponents' urging that intelligent design be included in the school system's science curriculum, the school board of Chesterfield County Public Schools in Virginia decided on May 23, 2007, to approve science textbooks for middle and high schools which do not include the idea of intelligent design. However, during the board meeting a statement was made that their aim was self-directed learning which "occurs only when alternative views are explored and discussed," and directed that professionals supporting curriculum development and implementation are to be required "to investigate and develop processes that encompass a comprehensive approach to the teaching and learning" of the theory of evolution, "along with all other topics that raise differences of thought and opinion." During the week before the meeting, one of the intelligent design proponents claimed that "Students are being excluded from scientific debate. It's time to bring this debate into the classroom," and presented A Scientific Dissent from Darwinism.

In 2017, Bertha Vazquez, a middle school science teacher and director of the Teacher Institute for Evolutionary Science at the Richard Dawkins Foundation for Reason and Science, published a comparison of the nation's middle school science standards.

== Polls ==
On July 2, 2026, Research Co. published a poll conducted on June 4–6, 2026, with 1,012 U.S. adults. It asked the question, “Which of these statements comes closest to your own point of view regarding the origin and development of human beings on earth?” It found that 27% of adults said human beings had definitely evolved over millions of years, 20% said they had probably evolved over millions of years, 10% said they had probably been created by God within the last 10,000 years, 29% said they had definitely been created by God within the last 10,000 years, and 14% were not sure.

Teachers have also been polled. In 2019, following up on a 2007 survey, teachers reported increasing numbers of hours spent teaching evolution, and more teachers were likely to emphasize broad scientific consensus on evolution and not give credence to creationism. The results also suggested that personally creationist teachers were less likely to be represented among public high school biology teachers. Part, but not all, of the explanation involves adoption in at least twenty states of the Next Generation Science Standards.

A 2019 Gallup creationism survey found that 40% of adults in the United States inclined to the belief that "God created humans in their present form at one time within the last 10,000 years" when asked for their beliefs regarding the origin and development of human beings. 22% believed that "human beings have developed over millions of years from less advanced forms of life, but God had no part in this process".

In 2006, a poll conducted by Zogby International commissioned by the Discovery Institute found that more than three to one of voters surveyed chose the option that biology teachers should teach Darwin's theory of evolution, but also "the scientific evidence against it." Approximately seven in ten (69%) sided with this view. In contrast, one in five (21%) chose the other option given, that biology teachers should teach only Darwin's theory of evolution and the scientific evidence that supports it. One in ten was not sure.

In 2000, a poll commissioned by People for the American Way found that among Americans:

- 29% believe public schools should teach evolution in science class but can discuss creationism there as a belief;
- 20% believe public schools should teach evolution only;
- 17% believe public schools should teach evolution in science class and religious theories elsewhere;
- 16% believe public schools should teach creation only;
- 13% believe public schools should teach both evolution and creationism in science class;
- 4% believe public schools should teach both but are not sure how.

== U.S. legal quotations ==
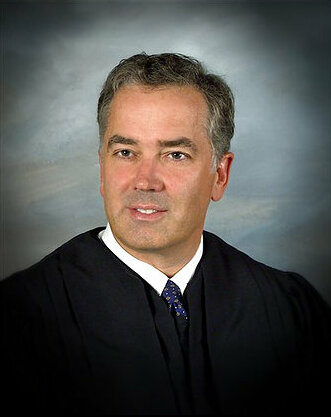
Judge John E. Jones III made a landmark ruling in Kitzmiller v. Dover Area School District

Epperson v. Arkansas (1968):

...the First Amendment does not permit the state to require that teaching and learning must be tailored to the principles or prohibitions of any religious sect or dogma...the state has no legitimate interest in protecting any or all religions from views distasteful to them.

McLean v. Arkansas (1982), the judge wrote that creation scientists:

...cannot properly describe the methodology used as scientific, if they start with a conclusion and refuse to change it regardless of the evidence developed during the course of the investigation.

Edwards v. Aguillard (1987):

...Because the primary purpose of the Creationism Act is to advance a particular religious belief, the Act endorses religion in violation of the First Amendment.

Webster v. New Lenox School District (1990), the United States Court of Appeals for the Seventh Circuit stated:

If a teacher in a public school uses religion and teaches religious beliefs or espouses theories clearly based on religious underpinnings, the principles of the separation of church and state are violated as clearly as if a statute ordered the teacher to teach religious theories such as the statutes in Edwards did.

Peloza v. Capistrano School District (1994), the United States Court of Appeals for the Ninth Circuit wrote:

The Supreme Court has held unequivocally that while belief in a Divine Creator of the universe is a religious belief, the scientific theory that higher forms of life evolved from lower ones is not.

Kitzmiller v. Dover Area School District (2005):

The proper application of both the endorsement and Lemon tests to the facts of this case makes it abundantly clear that the Board's ID Policy violates the Establishment Clause. In making this determination, we have addressed the seminal question of whether ID is science. We have concluded that it is not, and moreover that ID cannot uncouple itself from its creationist, and thus religious, antecedents.

== See also ==
- A Scientific Support for Darwinism
- Clergy Letter Project
- Creation and evolution in public education
- National Center for Science Education
- Project Steve
- Rejection of evolution by religious groups
- Science, Evolution, and Creationism
- "A Scientific Dissent from Darwinism"
