= Teacher Institute for Evolutionary Science =

- Abbreviation: TIES
- Formation: 2015
- Purpose: Science education
- Director: Bertha Vazquez
- Parent organization: Center for Inquiry; Richard Dawkins Foundation for Reason and Science
- Website: https://tieseducation.org/

The Teacher Institute for Evolutionary Science (TIES) is a project of the Richard Dawkins Foundation for Reason and Science and a program of the Center for Inquiry which provides free workshops and materials to elementary, middle school, and, more recently, high school science teachers to enable them to effectively teach evolution based on the Next Generation Science Standards.

== History ==
In 2013, Bertha Vazquez, TIES director and middle school science teacher in Miami, met Richard Dawkins at the University of Miami and discussed evolution education with him and a number of science professors. The discussion surrounded the issue of teachers feeling unprepared to teach evolution. This encounter and the understanding that teachers learn the most from each other inspired her to conduct workshops on evolution for her fellow teachers. After hearing about Vazquez's work, Dawkins followed up with a visit to Vazquez's school in 2014 to speak to teachers from the Miami-Dade County school district. Dawkins eventually asked Vazquez if she would be willing to take her workshop project nationwide. With the encouragement of Dawkins and funding from his foundation, and also with encouragement from Robyn Blumner of the Center for Inquiry, the Teacher Institute for Evolutionary Science began offering workshops in 2015.

== Activity ==
The first TIES workshop was in April 2015 in collaboration with the Miami Science Museum. A total of ten workshops took place in 2015. Since then, the program has expanded, as of 2020, to over 200 workshops in all 50 states. While Bertha Vazquez presented many of the workshops earlier on, over 80 presenters are now active in the nationwide program. Presenters are usually high school or college biology educators in the states in which their workshops take place, and workshops take into account the given state's evolution education standards. Workshops vary in length, and in cases of longer workshops or webinars, scientists and other relevant guests are also invited to present. Some of these have included Nathan Lents and Jonathan Tweet.

In response to the COVID-19 pandemic, TIES moved its workshops online and produced guided lessons in English and Spanish that students can work through on their own.

Vazquez sees TIES as not only about evolution education, but also about empowering teachers to be leaders in their educational communities.

TIES Workshops
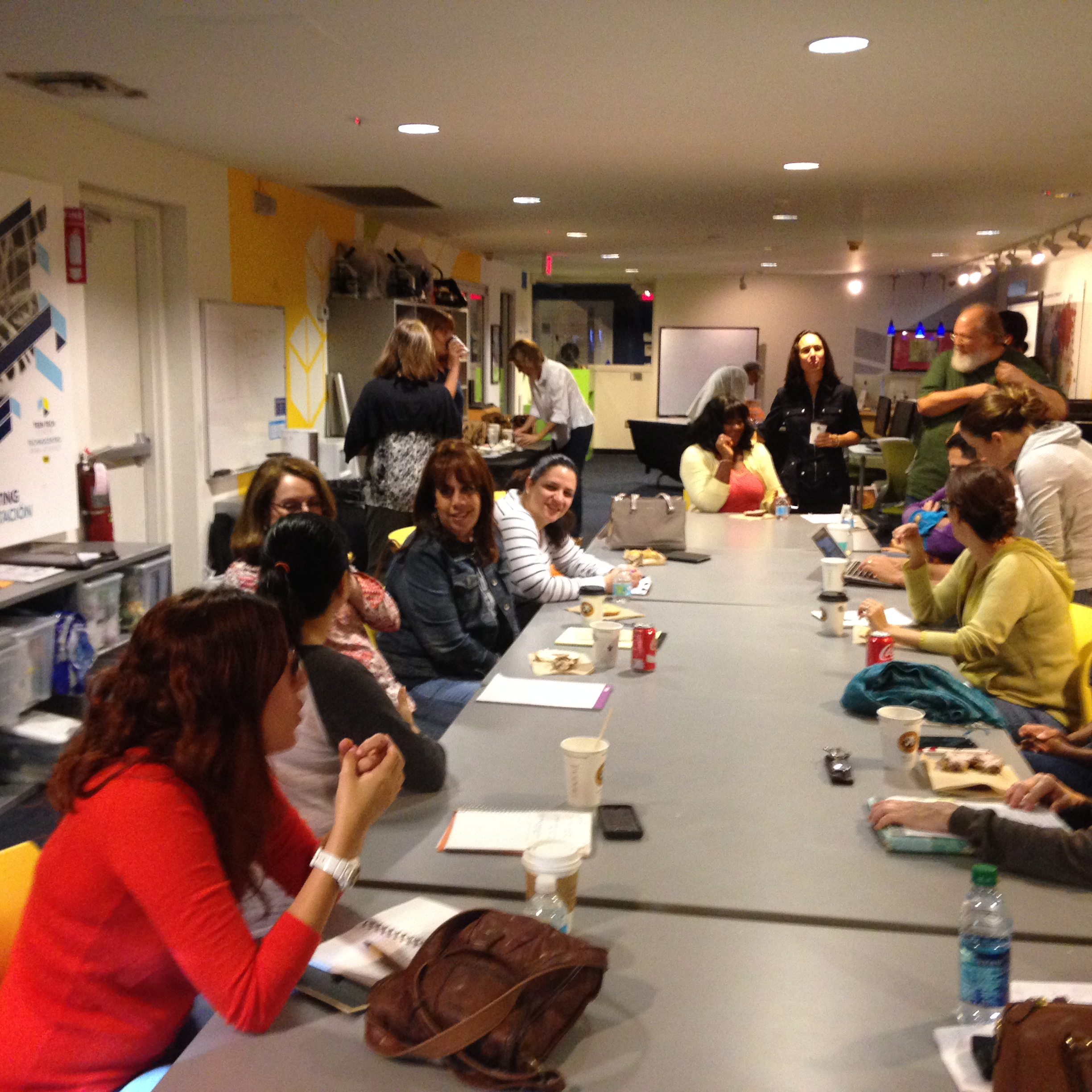
First TIES workshop

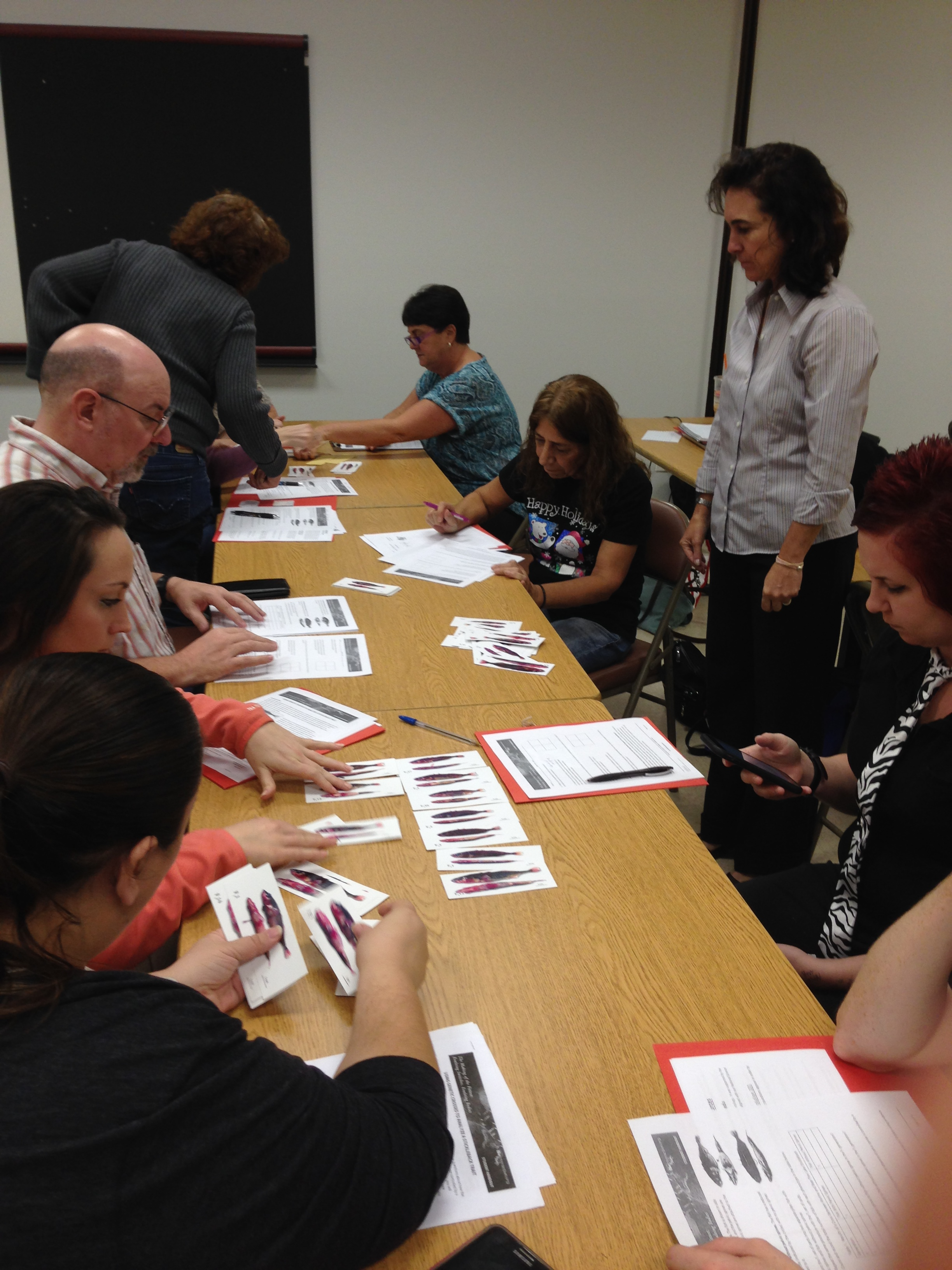
Trying classroom activities

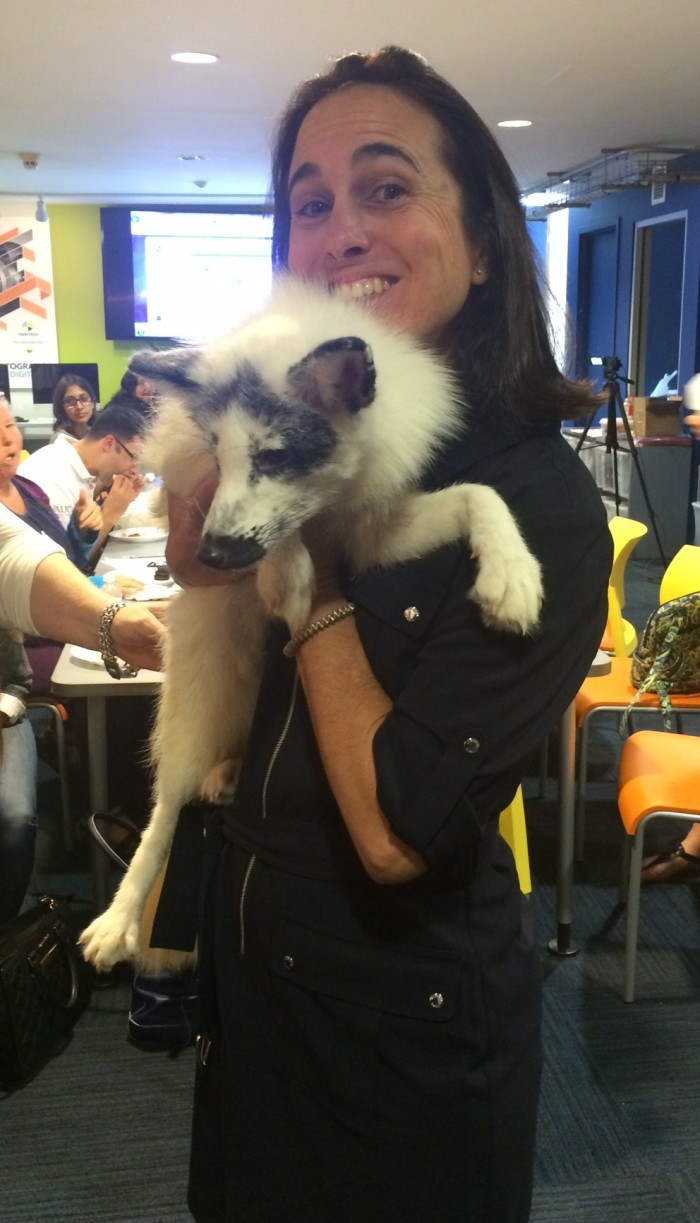
Experimental Siberian fox visits a workshop

== See also ==
- Creation and evolution in public education
- Science education
