= 2015 Texas pool party incident =

Viral video

- Location of McKinney in Collin County, Texas
- Date: June 5, 2015
- Venue: Craig Ranch North
- Location: McKinney, Texas, United States
- Also known as: McKinney Pool Party
- Cause: Eric Casebolt, a McKinney police officer, was video-recorded violently restraining an unarmed 15-year-old African-American girl at a pool party.
- Filmed by: Brandon Brooks
- Outcome: Grand jury declined to indict officer involved in incident

The 2015 Texas pool party incident, also known as the "McKinney pool party", was a civil disturbance that occurred on June 5, 2015, at a pool party in McKinney, Texas, United States.

While responding to 911 calls that reported the trespassing of dozens of individuals on private property, a McKinney police officer, corporal Eric Casebolt, was video-recorded violently restraining Dajerria Becton, a 15-year-old black girl wearing a swimsuit. He later drew his handgun on unarmed teen witnesses during the same incident.

Brandon Brooks filmed the encounter and posted the video on YouTube. Within hours, millions of people had seen it.

Casebolt was placed on administrative leave pending an investigation and he resigned within days. The incident sparked protests in McKinney involving hundreds of people. A grand jury declined to indict the officer.

== Incident ==
On June 5, 2015, police were called to a pool party and cookout at Craig Ranch North, an upper-middle-class neighborhood in McKinney.

Tatyana and Aryana Rhodes, African-American teens and neighborhood residents, had invited friends to the event to celebrate the end of the school year. Rhodes's mother, LaShauna Burks, told WFAA the party was approved by the neighborhood Homeowners Association (HoA); however, the HoA denied her claim.

Benét Embry, an attendee and resident, witnessed "a teenage party get way out of control." Another witness, Sean Toon, told security guards that teens were "jumping the fence." Neighborhood security was called to remove those accused of trespassing.

Attendee Miles Jai Thomas told HuffPost that the security guard "started making up rules to keep [African-American partygoers] out." While events were unfolding, a white woman made racist comments towards attendees. Tatyana Rhodes and the woman had an argument and a brief fight. Police were called to the scene as it started to escalate.

Although the original Facebook statement by the McKinney Police Department has been deleted, Snopes cited the post:

On June 5, 2015 at approximately 7:15 p.m., officers from the McKinney Police Department responded to a disturbance at the Craig Ranch North Community Pool. The initial call came in as a disturbance involving multiple juveniles at the location, who do not live in the area or have permission to be there, refusing to leave. McKinney Police received several additional calls related to this incident advising that juveniles were now actively fighting. First responding officers encountered a large crowd that refused to comply with police commands. Nine additional units responded to the scene. Officers were eventually able to gain control of the situation.

After being asked to disperse from the pool, Becton told police corporal Eric Casebolt she needed to find her glasses. Texas Monthly describes the video footage:

Moments later, [Becton is] thrown to the ground and grabbed by the hair. When two boys approach, [Casebolt] pulls his gun on them, leading the girl to scream. When she does so, he grabs her again by the back of the head and slams her face-first to the ground, at which point he holds her down by planting his knee on her back as she cries, "I'm not fighting you."

Casebolt held his gun in a "low ready" position as those attempting to intervene retreated. One teen, Adrian Martin, was arrested after appearing to lunge at the officer. Martin says he was attempting to comfort Becton, his brother's classmate; a friend bumped into Martin and made his actions seem aggressive.

After Casebolt pointed his gun, Martin ran away because he feared that he might be shot by police. He was the only person taken into custody after the incident. Charges were later dropped and Martin did not sue the McKinney Police Department.

The entire event was captured on a cell phone camera by a teenager who lived in the neighborhood.

Becton was not charged.

== Aftermath ==
Casebolt, a McKinney Police Department officer who served in the department for ten years and received the McKinney Patrolman of the Year award for 2008, was placed on administrative leave after the video went viral; he subsequently resigned.

According to his lawyer, Jane Bishkin, Casebolt's work that day prior to the pool incident had taken "an emotional toll." He had dealt with one suicide attempt and another unusually disturbing suicide before arriving at Craig Ranch North. Bishkin noted that the officer was apologetic for his actions, but denied that they were racially motivated. He acknowledged that he "let his emotions get the better of him." According to Bishkin, a white woman was also detained during the incident.

Gawker submitted a Public Information Act request for Casebolt's records and emails concerning his conduct. A McKinney attorney claimed the request would cost over $79,000. Gawker viewed this exorbitant amount as a "deliberate attempt to conceal information" and challenged the fee. A spokesperson for the city later called the estimate "erroneous" and "inaccurate," promising to provide an updated estimate.

Tatyana Rhodes faced difficulty finding venues after the June 5 incident. The venue that was to be the site of the next party in the series received a number of threatening and harassing phone calls.

=== Reaction ===
On June 8, 2015, about 800 protesters marched through McKinney demanding Casebolt's firing. They walked from a school to the swimming pools where the incident unfolded. Many of the protesters accused the officers involved of being racist. Some demonstrators held signs reading "My skin color is not a crime" and "Don't tread on our kids."

McKinney Police Chief Greg Conley said that the officer's actions were "indefensible" and did not reflect on the department's high standard of action. Conley stated that the officer was "out of control" during the incident. The police department also said they had started an investigation.

=== Criminal proceedings ===
None of the individuals accused of trespassing were charged with a crime.

Collin County prosecutors ordered the Texas Rangers to conduct an independent investigation. On January 11, 2016, the Texas Rangers concluded their investigation and returned it to the Collin County District Attorney's Office for further handling.

On June 23, 2016, a grand jury declined to indict Casebolt, closing the criminal case against him.

=== Civil suit ===
On January 4, 2017, Dajerria Becton and her legal guardian, Shashona Becton, filed a civil suit against Casebolt, the McKinney Police Department, and the city of McKinney, TX. The suit sought damages of US$5 million for the officer's use of excessive force and holding Dajerria Becton without probable cause, thus violating her constitutional rights.

This was the second suit brought against Casebolt involving race. In 2008, he was sued by Robert Earl Brown. Brown, an African-American man, alleged the officer of "racial profiling and excessive force". Brown's suit against Casebolt was dismissed in 2009.

The Becton family was represented by attorney Kim T. Cole, a graduate of Howard University School of Law. In 2018, the case was settled for $184,850. According to The Dallas Morning News, Becton received $148,850 and the remaining $36,000 was divided among six other teens involved in the incident.

To celebrate the lawsuit's settlement and high school graduation, Cole planned to throw a "fabulous" pool party for Dajerria Becton and others detained at the Craig Ranch North community pool in 2015. She hoped it would "offer some healing and mark the start of a new chapter" of the teens' lives.

Per Cole's interview with TeenVogue, Dajerria Becton planned to start a business with her settlement and pursue a career in dentistry.
