= Earl Ofari Hutchinson =

American author and media critic

- Born: October 8, 1945 (age 81); Chicago, Illinois, U.S.
- Occupations: Journalist, author, radio personality

Earl Ofari Hutchinson (born October 8, 1945) is an American author and media critic.

== Early life and education ==
His father, Earl Hutchinson Sr., is the lead author of A Colored Man's Journey Through 20th Century Segregated America published by Middle Passage Press. His daughter Sikivu Hutchinson is a nationally acclaimed author and speaker. His son Fanon Hutchinson is a recognized documentary videographer and producer.

He was born in Chicago, Illinois, and attended Catholic elementary schools and Mt. Carmel High School. He relocated to Los Angeles in 1961, attended Dorsey High School. He graduated from California State University, Los Angeles with a BA in sociology. He earned an MA in humanities from California State University, Dominguez Hills.

== Career ==
A progressive commentator, Hutchinson is the author of more than 10 books on politics and racial issues in America. He is a contributor to a variety of news outlets and websites on varying topics concerning politics and race, and is often interviewed for various print and broadcast outlets.

He hosts the live call-in program The Hutchinson Report on Pacifica Radio outlet KPFK-FM radio in Los Angeles featuring his commentary and the voices of listener-callers, and KTYM-Radio in Los Angeles. He has appeared frequently as a guest commentator on several U.S. network television programs since the 1990s, offering his often well-reasoned and arguably moderate takes on topical, breaking and controversial news stories.

Hutchinson's 1996 book Betrayed: The Presidential Failure to Protect Black Lives shed light on the 1964 murders of two African-American teenagers by Ku Klux Klansman. His book From King to Obama: Witness to a Turbulent History is a personal look at the major events and personalities of the half-century from the 1960s through the first decades of the 21st century.

His three most recent books are: How Obama Won; The Ethnic Presidency: How Race decides the Race to the White House; The Latino Challenge to Black America. Hutchinson has written extensively on race and politics in the Los Angeles Times, Newsday, The Washington Post, The Christian Science Monitor, Chicago Tribune, and The Baltimore Sun. His featured interviews and comments on race and politics have appeared in Time, Newsweek, The New York Times, ABC's World News Tonight.

He is a frequent guest analyst on Fox News John Gibson Show, O'Reilly Show, Hannity & Colmes, Glenn Beck Show, PBS Lehrer Report, NPR's Talk of the Nation, various CNN news shows, New Nation MSNBC.

He is the National Political Writer for New America Media and a regular contributor to The Huffington Post, the grio-MSNBC, and Examiner.com. He hosts two syndicated public affairs and issues radio talk shows on KTYM Radio and KPFK Pacifica Network Radio Los Angeles, and the Hutchinson Report, Newsmaker Network. The network syndicates the Hutchinson Report in more than fifty cities and Washington DC nationally.

Hutchinson is the founder of the Los Angeles Urban Policy Roundtable (LAUPR), which sponsors community forums and provides grant funding to nonprofit grassroots organizations. The LAUPR's Impact Micro Awards are made to support organizations and individuals that have a proven track record of commitment to building community sustainability projects, activities, and service. Grantees have included the Harmony Project (formerly the Inner City Youth Orchestra of Los Angeles), Eso Won Books in Los Angeles's Leimert Park district, the Korean American Historical Society and Centro Latino for Literacy.

== Personal life ==
His daughter Sikivu Hutchinson is a feminist activist and author, whose books include Imagining Transit: Race, Gender and Transportation Politics in Los Angeles and Godless Americana: Race and Religious Rebels. His son Fanon Hutchinson works in broadcasting for the American Forces Network and is a videographer/editor and producer of short films. Hutchinson endorsed Democratic candidate Hillary Clinton in the run-up for the 2016 U.S. presidential election.

== Books ==
- The Myth of Black Capitalism (1970, as Earl Ofari); ISBN 978-0-85345-163-1
- Let Your Motto Be Resistance: The Life and Thought of Henry Highland Garnett (1972, as Earl Ofari); ISBN 978-0-8070-5430-7
- The Mugging of Black America (1991) ISBN 978-0-913543-21-4
- Black Fatherhood: The Guide to Male Parenting (1994); ISBN 978-1-881032-09-0
- Black Fatherhood II: Black Women Talk About Their Men (1994); ISBN 978-1-881032-10-6
- Blacks and Reds: Race and Class in Conflict, 1919–1990 (1994); ISBN 978-0870133619
- Beyond O.J.: Race, Sex and Class Lessons For America (1996); ISBN 978-1-881032-12-0
- Betrayed: A History of Presidential Failure to Protect Black Lives (1996); ISBN 978-0-8133-2466-1
- The Assassination of the Black Male Image (1997); ISBN 0-684-83657-2
- The Crisis in Black and Black (1998); ISBN 978-1-881032-15-1
- A Colored Man's Journey Through 20th Century Segregated America (2000); ISBN 978-1-881032-17-5
- The Disappearance of Black Leadership (2000); ISBN 978-1881032168
- The Emerging Black GOP Majority (2006); ISBN 1-881032-19-1
- The Latino Challenge to Black America: Towards a Conversation Between African Americans and Hispanics (2007); ISBN 978-1-881032-22-9
- The Ethnic Presidency: How Race Decides the Race to the White House (2008); ISBN 978-1881032250
- How the GOP Can Keep the White House, How the Democrats Can Take it Back (2008); ISBN 978-1881032359
- How Obama Won (2009); ISBN 978-1-4392-1929-4
