= Richard Dawkins Foundation for Reason and Science =

Non-profit organization

- Founded: 2006; 20 years ago
- Founder: Richard Dawkins
- Type: Scientific education, advocacy, and secularism organization
- Tax ID no.: 1119952 (UK); 98-0499347 (US EIN)
- Location: 1012 14th Street NW, Suite 209, Washington, DC 20005, USA
- Region served: United Kingdom; United States
- Key people: Board of Directors; Richard Dawkins (Founder and Chair); J. Anderson Thomson (Treasurer and Secretary); David Cowan (Trustee); Robyn Blumner (President and CEO) Advisory Board; Bill Nye (advisor); Julia Sweeney (advisor); Woody Kaplan (advisor); Baris Karadogan (advisor); Carolyn Porco (advisor); Andrés Roemer (advisor); Todd Stiefel (advisor); Greg Stikeleather (advisor)
- Affiliations: Humanism, Atheism
- Revenue: $1,817,768 (2015)
- Expenses: $788,479 (2015)
- Website: richarddawkins.net

The Richard Dawkins Foundation for Reason and Science (RDFRS or RDF) is a division of Center for Inquiry (CFI) founded by British biologist Richard Dawkins in 2006 to promote scientific literacy and secularism.

Originally a non-profit based in Washington, D.C., the organization merged with CFI in 2016.

== History ==
After Richard Dawkins' success with the book The God Delusion, he created the foundation with its headquarters in the United States to work toward a world in which religion no longer interferes with the advance of science and in which people use their critical thinking skills to evaluate theist claims about the nature of reality.

Dawkins complained of the difficulty he faced in gaining tax-free status, which he attributes to the secular nature of the organization. In contrast to the presumption by officials that religious organizations benefit humanity without evidence (for instance Our Lady of Perpetual Exemption), he points to a letter he received from the British Charity Commission requesting evidence for the claim that the advancement of science is connected to the public good.

Theist author Marion Ledwig suggests that the foundation may have been set up as an atheist counterpart to the John Templeton Foundation, an organization which Dawkins has publicly criticized, especially in The God Delusion, for corrupting science. In a TED talk prior to writing The God Delusion, Dawkins had called for the need for an "anti-Templeton" to step up, saying that if his books sold better, he would take the initiative himself.

Dawkins describes his foundation's purpose this way:

"Critical thinking is the real saviour of humankind. My foundation promotes respect for people who hold critical thinking as a cherished personal value and use it in day-to-day life. The logical counter to religious extremism is people who rely on evidence to make decisions. Yet the voice of secular people is maligned in this country. Forty-five per cent of Americans think you have to believe in God to be moral. Secular voices are considered immoral. They are not listened to on that basis. We must counter this baseless hostility to allow the contributions of secular people in vital national debates to count. Making secular views and people welcome in politics and policy-making will advance human safety, security, health, achievement, prosperity and most of all, science."

The organization began accepting members in April 2015.

Among its activities, RDFRS finances research into the psychology of belief and religion, finances scientific education programs and materials, and publicizes and supports secular charitable organisations.

The foundation has been granted charitable status in the United Kingdom and status as a 501(c)(3) nonprofit private operating foundation in the United States. RDFRS financed research on the psychology of belief and religion, financed scientific education programs and materials, and publicised and supported charitable organisations that are secular in nature. The foundation also offers humanist, rationalist, and scientific materials through its website.

Dawkins has said the "trend toward theocratic thinking in the United States is a danger not only for America but for the entire world." Connected to this concern, Dawkins invited Sean Faircloth to serve as opening speaker on Dawkins's 2011 US book tour. Faircloth is author of the book Attack of the Theocrats, How the Religious Right Harms Us All and What We Can Do About It. The Richard Dawkins Foundation (United States branch) later hired Faircloth, who has ten years experience as a state legislator, as Director of Strategy and Policy.

== Activism ==
Next time somebody tells you something that sounds important, think to yourself: 'Is this the kind of thing that people probably know because of evidence? Or is it the kind of thing that people only believe because of tradition, authority or revelation?' And, next time somebody tells you that something is true, why not say to them: 'What kind of evidence is there for that?' And if they can't give you a good answer, I hope you'll think very carefully before you believe a word they say.

— Richard Dawkins, A Devil's Chaplain

RDFRS also invests in creating, producing and influencing the development of entertainment products for general audiences that support secularism and fight scientific illiteracy.

=== 2009 ===
In March 2009, following proposed anti-evolution resolutions by Oklahoma State Representative Todd Thomsen, including condemning a visit by Dawkins to Oklahoma, he instructed the U.S. branch of the Richard Dawkins Foundation for Reason and Science to donate $5,000 to Oklahomans for Excellence in Science Education.

=== 2011 ===
In March 2011, the RDFRS along with the Freedom From Religion Foundation began The Clergy Project which is a confidential on-line community that supports members as they move from their faith.

=== 2014 ===
In 2014 RDFRS joined several similar organizations, including the Stiefel Freethought Foundation, the Secular Student Alliance, and the Secular Coalition for America, to form Openly Secular, an initiative which aims to combat and draw attention to anti-atheist discrimination and to encourage more people to openly self-identify as nonbelievers. Among the strategies is to get celebrities to come forward as openly secular. Videos have been posted by Penn & Teller, Bill Maher, NFL star Arian Foster, Julia Sweeney, John Davidson and others.

=== 2015 ===
In April 2015, RDFRS launched the Teacher Institute for Evolutionary Science (TIES) to provide middle school teachers with workshops and free online tools to teach evolution and answer its critics. TIES is led by Bertha Vazquez, an award-winning middle school science teacher in Miami, FL.

=== 2016 ===
In January 2016, RDFRS announced that it was merging with the Center for Inquiry, with Robyn Blumner as the CEO of the combined organizations.

The merger was completed in December 2016, with RDFRS becoming a division of CFI.

The atheist Sikivu Hutchinson criticized the merger of the secular organizations Center for Inquiry and the Richard Dawkins Foundation for Reason and Science which gave Richard Dawkins a seat on the board of directors of the Center for Inquiry. Her criticism was that both organizations had all white board of directors.

== See also ==
- Brights movement
- Out Campaign
  - Openly Secular
- The Skeptics Society
