= Bertha Vazquez =

American educator

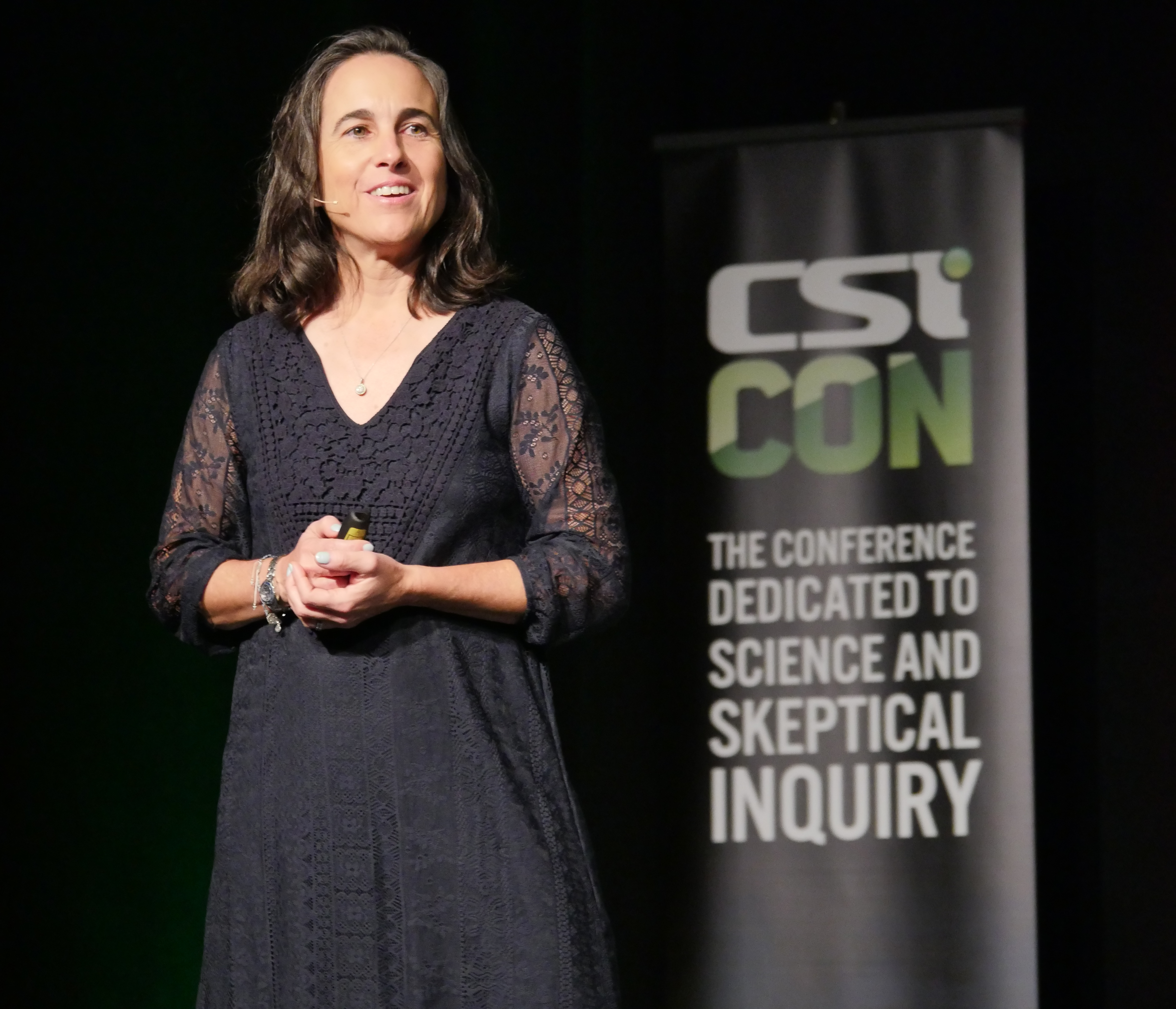
- Vazquez in October 2018
- Occupations: Director, Center for Inquiry
- Known for: Teacher Institute for Evolutionary Science (TIES)
- Awards: National Association of Biology Teachers Evolution Education Award; National Center for Science Education Friend of Darwin Award

Academic background
- Education: B.A. in biology Master's degree in science education
- Alma mater: University of Miami; Florida International University

Bertha Vazquez is an American educator. She retired from classroom teaching in 2023, and she became the Director of Education for the Center for Inquiry. Vazquez was appointed a Committee for Skeptical Inquiry fellow in 2020, and received the 2023 Friend of Darwin award from the National Center for Science Education (NCSE).

== Early life and education ==
She obtained an undergraduate degree in biology from the University of Miami and a master's in science education from Florida International University.

== Career ==
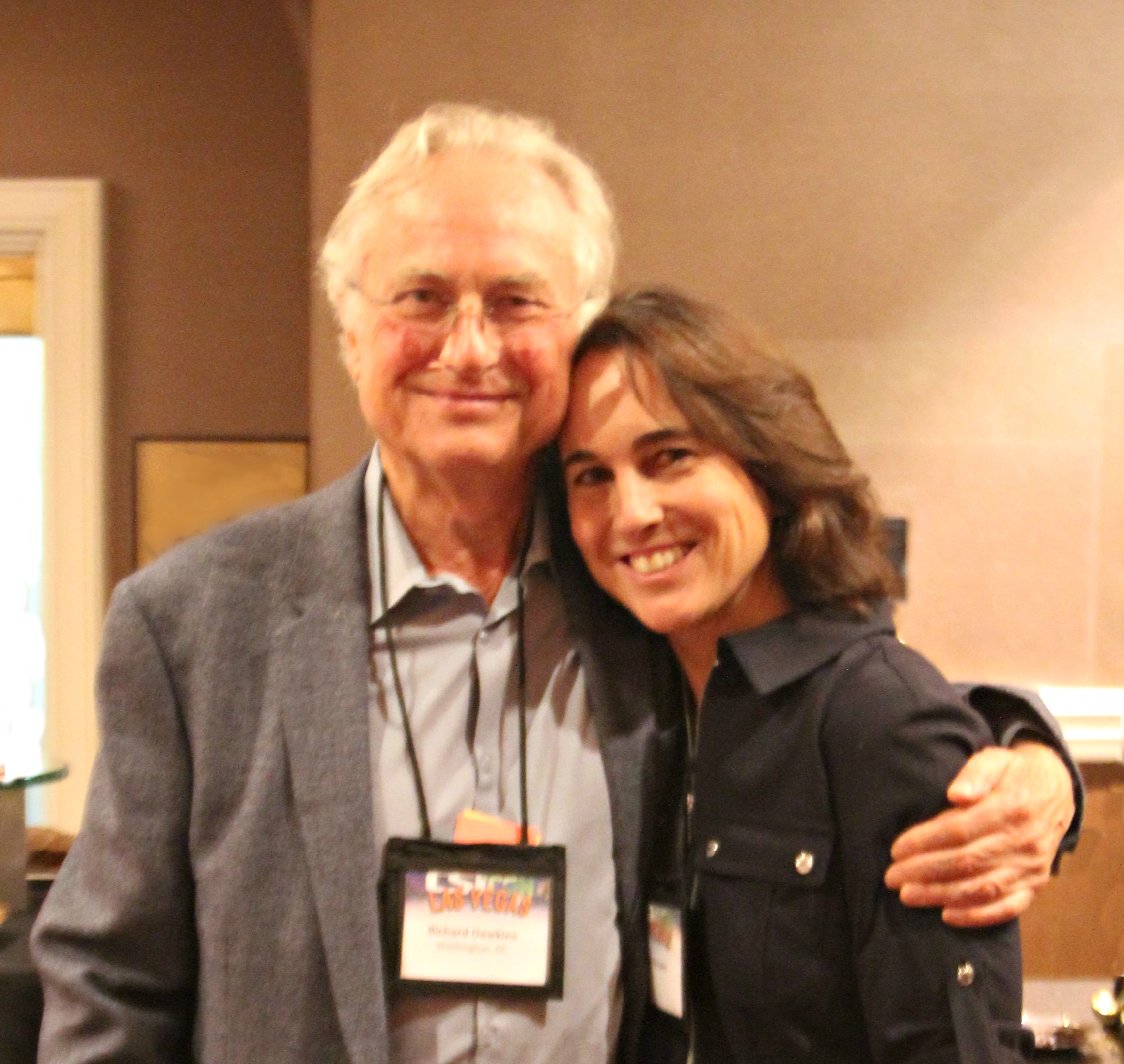
Vazquez and Richard Dawkins at CSICon in October 2016

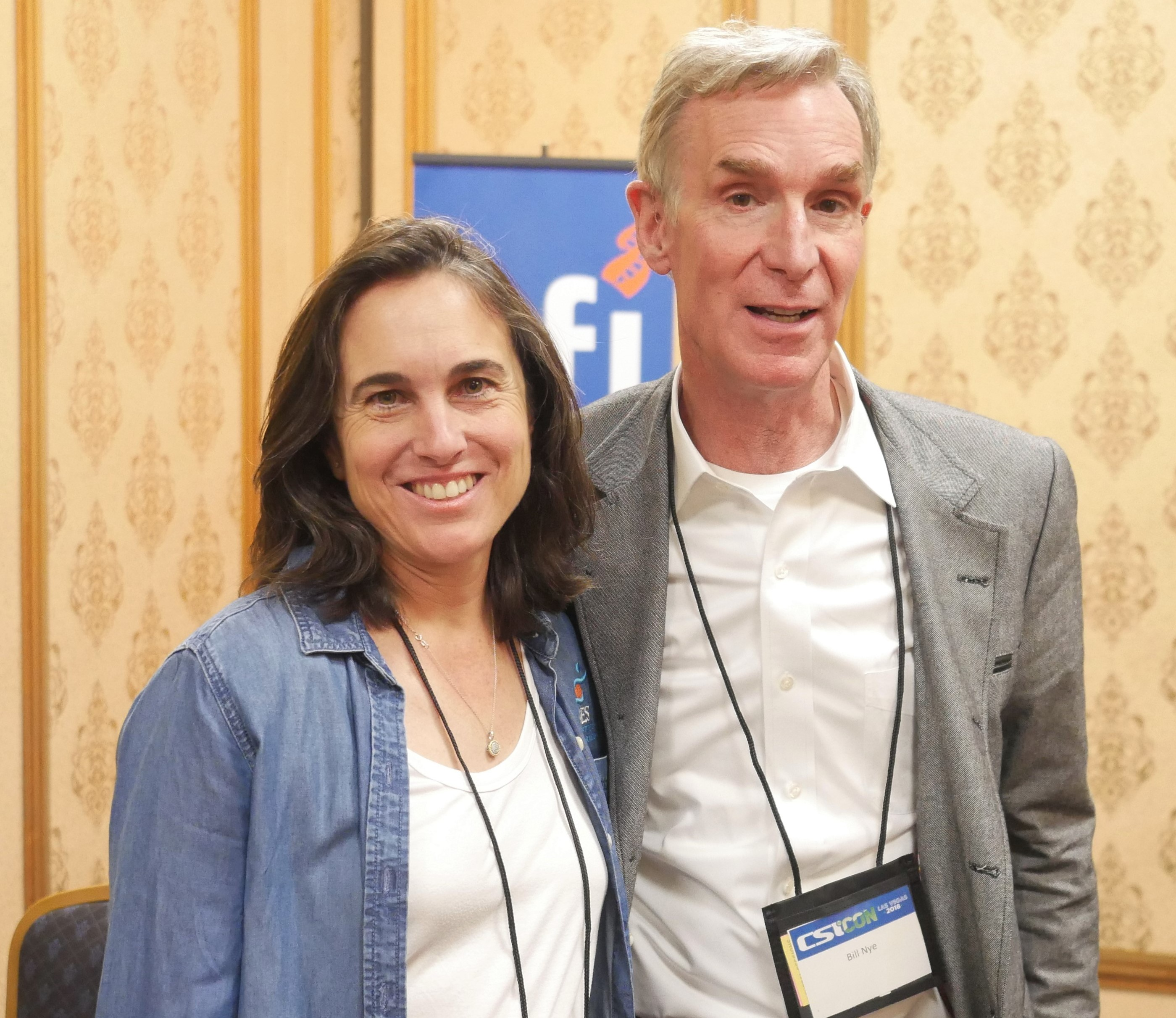
Vazquez and Bill Nye at CSICon in October 2018

Vazquez served as an exhibit guide at the Phillip and Patricia Frost Museum of Science in Coconut Grove, Florida in 1989. She began her teaching career in Albi, France also in 1989.

Vazquez began teaching in Miami-Dade County Public Schools in 1990. She has taught sixth grade integrated science, seventh grade integrated science, Earth and space science, physical science, and biology. She also has taught French in Miami-Dade County Public Schools. Vazquez's main teaching interest has been in environmental education. She encouraged her fellow teachers even in non-scientific subjects to incorporate climate change education in their curricula. Her efforts were recognized with the Charles C. Bartlett Award from the National Environmental Education Foundation in 2009.

Vazquez was passionate about middle-school students learning about climate change, especially as she taught in Florida where they are "seeing the dramatic impacts of a warming planet". She intertwined lessons on climate change in the curriculum, assigning her students not only to learn about it, but to seek out and understand why some people don't believe that it is caused by humans.

She also worked for the National Board for Professional Teaching Standards (NBPTS) from 2001 to 2009 as a Certification Council Member, Scoring Director, Science Portfolio Trainer, faculty member for the Development of National Mentoring Standards, Renewal Document Development team member, and portfolio development team member.

=== Teacher Institute for Evolutionary Science ===
She met Richard Dawkins in 2013 at the University of Miami, where she discussed evolution education with him. This, and her belief that teachers learn the most from each other, inspired her to conduct workshops on evolution for her fellow teachers.

Dawkins followed up with a visit to Vazquez's school in 2014 to speak to teachers from Miami-Dade County Public Schools. She received encouragement of Dawkins and Robyn Blumner, and she founded the Teacher Institute for Evolutionary Science (TIES). Vazquez sees TIES about evolution education and empowering teachers as leaders in their educational communities. TIES has presented more than 400 teacher professional development workshops in each state since its inception.

== Publications ==
Vazquez, B. (2025). CFI's flagship educational program celebrates ten-year anniversary. Free Inquiry, 45 (4), June/July.

Vazquez, B., & Trecek-King, M. (2025). Critical thinking about our vulnerabilities to misinformation. Skeptical Inquirer, 49(3), May/June.

Vazquez, B., (2025). Misconceptions about Climate Change: An Educator’s Guide. Skeptical Inquirer, 49 (1), January/February

The book, What Teachers Want to Know About Teaching Climate Change, was published by Corwin Press in 2025. The book gives busy teachers the tools they need to incorporate climate change education across disciplines and align the content with existing standards without adding a new topic for overworked teachers to tackle.

Vazquez, B. (2025). What If Facts Don’t Matter? The Science Teacher, 92(1), 58–59. https://doi.org/10.1080/00368555.2024.2434702

Vazquez, B. (2025, January 15). *Fostering hope through action: Teaching climate change*. Corwin Connect. https://corwin-connect.com/2025/01/fostering-hope-through-action-teaching-climate-change/

The book, On Teaching Evolution, was published in December 2021. Written by members of the Teacher Institute for Evolutionary Science who have tackled the topic of evolution in their classroom for decades, On Teaching Evolution offers practical advice and sample lesson plans for fellow science teachers.

Bertha contributed an article to a special climate issue of skeptical Inquirer, edited by Bill Nye. Her piece is titled, Misconceptions about Climate Change, An Educators Guide (Skeptical Inquirer Magazine, Dec 2024)

In June 2022, Bertha Vazquez translated the book, Breve Historia de 4 Mil Millones de Años: Entendiendo a Darwin, by Maria Jinich.

She wrote the forward for the book, Investigating School Psychology: Pseudoscience, Fringe Science, and Controversies, edited by Michael I. Axelrod and Stephen Hupp and published by Routledge on June 3, 2024

Vazquez, Bertha & Landorf, Hilary & Simons-Lane, L. (2016). Next Door to Old Smokey: Engaging in Scientific Measurements and Public Action. Middle Level Learning. January/February 2016. 12–16.

Vazquez, Bertha (2017) Helping Teachers Teach Evolution in the United States, Skeptical Inquirer Volume 41.3, May/June 2016

Vazquez, Bertha (17 July 2017). "A state-by-state comparison of middle school science standards on evolution in the United States" Evolution: Education and Outreach. 10 (5)
