= Sikivu Hutchinson =

American feminist, author, and atheist activist

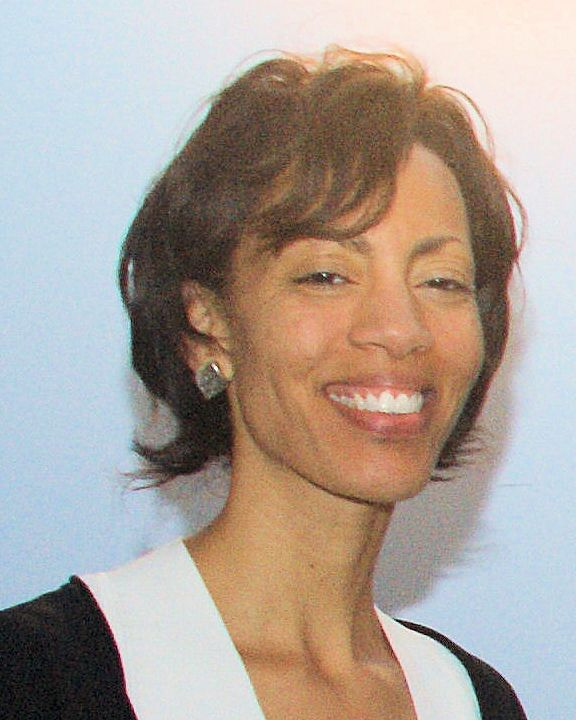
- Sikivu Hutchinson, 2010
- Born: United States
- Education: UCLA, NYU
- Known for: Author of: Humanists in the Hood: Unapologetically Black, Feminist, and Heretical (2020); Godless Americana: Race and Religious Rebels (2013); Moral Combat: Black Atheists, Gender Politics, and the Values Wars (2011); Imagining Transit: Race, Gender, and Transportation Politics in Los Angeles (Travel Writing Across the Disciplines) (2003)
- Scientific career
- Workplaces: USC Center for Feminist Research
- Website: www.sikivuhutchinson.com www.blackfemlens.com

Sikivu Hutchinson's voice
recorded August 2014

Sikivu Hutchinson is an American author, playwright, director, and musician. Her multi-genre work explores feminism, gender justice, racial justice, LGBTQIA+ rights, humanism and atheism. She is the author of Humanists in the Hood: Unapologetically Black, Feminist, and Heretical (2020); White Nights, Black Paradise (2015); Godless Americana: Race and Religious Rebels (2013); Moral Combat: Black Atheists; Gender Politics, and the Values Wars (2011); and Imagining Transit: Race, Gender, and Transportation Politics in Los Angeles (Travel Writing Across the Disciplines) (2003). Her plays include "White Nights, Black Paradise", "Rock 'n' Roll Heretic" and "Narcolepsy, Inc.". "Rock 'n' Roll Heretic" was among the 2023 Lambda Literary award LGBTQ Drama finalists. Moral Combat is the first book on atheism to be published by an African-American woman. In 2013 she was named Secular Woman of the year and she was awarded Foundation Beyond Belief's 2015 Humanist Innovator award. She was also a recipient of Harvard's 2020 Humanist of the Year award.

== Early life and education ==
Her grandfather Earl Hutchinson Sr. and father Earl Ofari Hutchinson are both authors. Hutchinson graduated from New York University with a Ph.D. in Performance Studies in 1999.

== Early career ==
Hutchinson has written articles for The Huffington Post, The Feminist Wire, thehumanist.com, the LA Progressive, and The L.A. Times and the Washington Post. She is a Senior Fellow with the Institute of Humanist Studies and founder of the Women's Leadership Project program for girls of color in South L.A.

She has taught women's studies, urban studies, cultural studies, African American Humanism and education at the California Institute of the Arts, UCLA, Pitzer College, and Western Washington University.

== Moral Combat ==
In her book, Moral Combat, she examines what she views as the hijacking of civil rights by the Christian Right; the connections between humanism, feminism and social justice; the importance of humanism for pre-college education; the backlash of religious fundamentalism, in the vein of the Tea Party, against progressive public policy; and the efforts of atheists of color to challenge the "New Atheist" movement, which values a narrow conception of science and disregards both social and also economic justice. Hutchinson frames her critique in the contemporary realities of working- and middle-class African-American communities which are just as steeped in the tradition of religiosity-due to capitalism and de facto segregation—as they are in the cultural trappings of the Black Church. Hutchinson highlights Nella Larsen's work as a touchstone for black feminist humanist thought. Hutchinson also explores the emergence of black atheist and freethought activism and spotlights the voices of African American non-believers from around the country.

== Black Skeptics group ==
Formed by Hutchinson in March 2010 she explained to KTYM radio the reason she formed the group was a "response to the emergent need amongst African-American non-believers to have some kind of community and interpersonal connection to each other, in real time". She believes that there is a large community of black non-believers on social media sites, but it is important for these people to find a "sanctuary from the hyper-religiosity that African-Americans are steeped in". The group was featured in a May 2012 article that chronicled how greater numbers of African Americans were leaving religious faith and adopting atheism and freethought.

== Political views ==
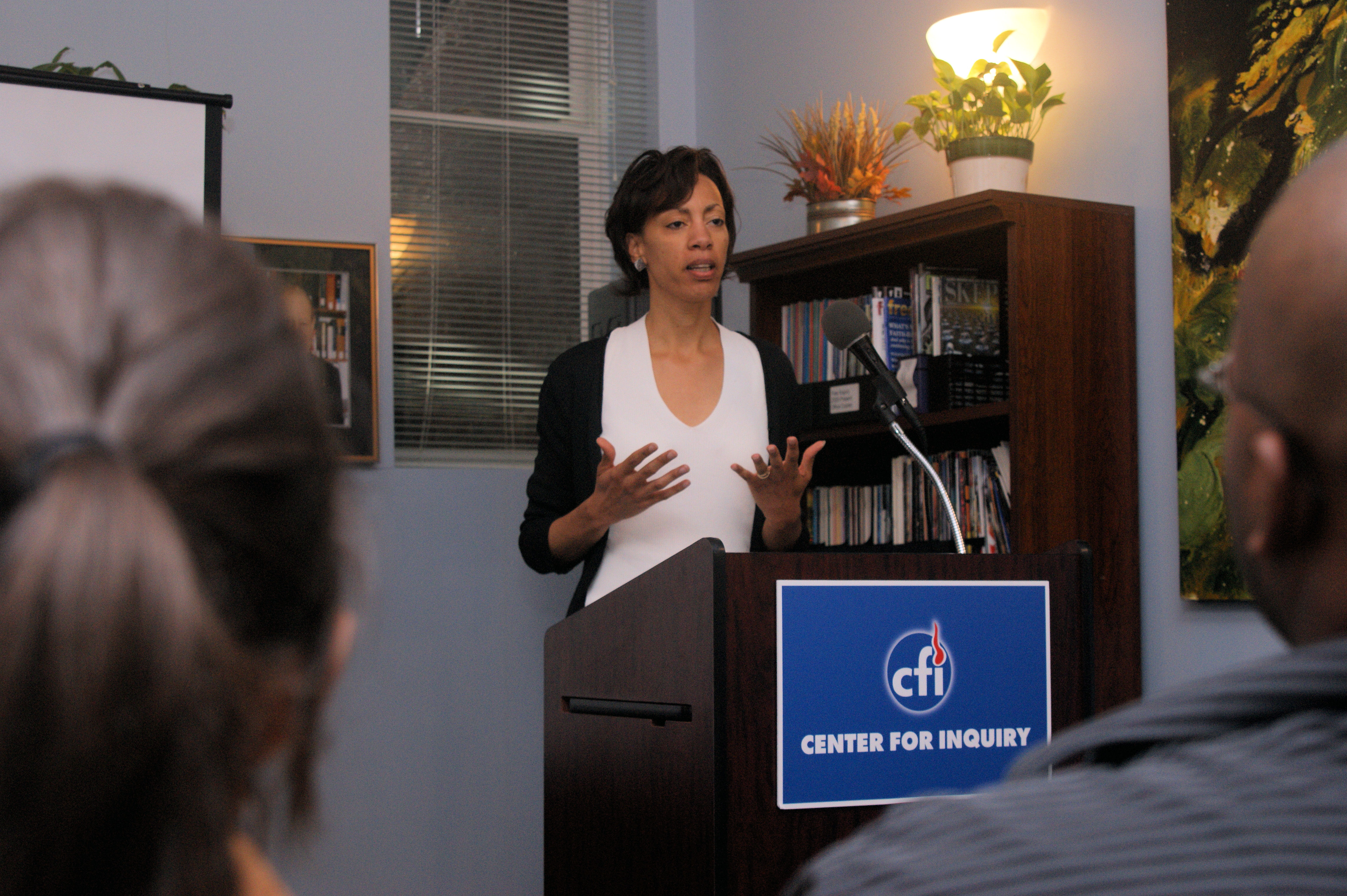
Sikivu Hutchinson speaking at the Center for Inquiry, Washington, DC. in 2010.

=== Diversity in religious skepticism ===
Hutchinson has stated that "While black male non-believers are given more leeway to be heretics or just MIA from church, black women who openly profess non-theist views are deemed especially traitorous, having 'abandoned' their primary role as purveyors of cultural and religious tradition." Much of Hutchinson's work focuses on the cultural and social history of African-American secular humanist thought and its role in black liberation struggle. Hutchinson's work also challenges the social conservatism of the Black Church with respect to abortion, gay rights and women's rights.

Hutchinson has challenged the lack of racial diversity and attention to institutional racism in the secular and New Atheist movements. She has championed the inclusion of anti-racism, anti-sexism, and anti-heterosexism in mainstream secular humanist and New Atheist discourse. She has also written extensively on the role of freethought and secular humanism in black women's liberation and gender justice.

In 2016, Hutchinson criticized the merger of the secular organizations Center for Inquiry and the Richard Dawkins Foundation for Reason and Science which gave Richard Dawkins a seat on the board of directors of the Center for Inquiry. Her criticism was that both organizations had an all-white board of directors.

=== Humanism ===
Hutchinson subscribes to a radical humanist vision that eschews religious and social hierarchies of race, gender, sexuality, class, and ability status because they undermine the universal human rights, bodily autonomy, and self-determination of Black and BIPOC peoples. For Black and BIPOC communities, radical secular Humanism reinforces the cultural legitimacy, visibility, and validity of secular humanists, freethinkers, and atheists of color within the context of a white supremacist, heterosexist, patriarchal, economically disenfranchising ideological regime which is based on racial capitalism and equates morality with Abrahamic religious paradigms and beliefs. African American radical secular humanism is intersectional, embraces socialist political and economic structures and rejects the notion that faith and theism are the core of African American cultural identities.

Hutchinson has argued for the articulation of a culturally relevant humanism based on secular social, racial, and gender justice that eschews notions of colorblindness and post-racialism, focusing instead on the lived experiences, cultural knowledge, social histories and social capital of diverse communities She has argued that the racist and white supremacist objectification of women of color as hyper-sexual "Jezebels" has made African American and Latina women especially vulnerable to paradigms of femininity that emphasize self-sacrifice and obeisance to conservative Christian mores. Hutchinson has written that the heterosexist ideal of the "sacrificial good woman" of faith straitjackets women of color and effectively contributes to high rates of intimate partner violence, sexual assault and HIV/STI contraction in communities of color because masculinity and femininity are viewed as oppositional to each other. Hutchinson considers her activism in the humanist sphere to be inextricably bound to the other identities.

== Billboard campaign ==
In 2012 Hutchinson was featured in a national billboard campaign of prominent black non-believers launched by African Americans for Humanism. She was paired with author Zora Neale Hurston, a folklorist of African-American culture who wrote of being a skeptic in her essay "Religion."

== Books ==
- Rock and Roll Heretic: The Life and Times of Rory Tharpe. Infidel Books. 2021. ISBN 978-0578852362.
- Humanists in the Hood: Unapologetically Black, Feminist, and Heretical. Pitchstone Publishing. 2020. ISBN 978-1634311984.
- White Nights, Black Paradise. Infidel Books. 2015. ISBN 978-0692267134.
- Godless Americana: Race and Religious Rebels. Infidel Books. 2013. ISBN 978-0615586106.
- Moral Combat: Black Atheists, Gender Politics and the Value Wars. Infidel Press. 2011. ISBN 978-0578071862.
- Imagining Transit: Race, Gender, and Transportation Politics in Los Angeles (Travel Writing Across the Disciplines). Peter Lang Publishing. 2003. ISBN 978-0820455860.
