= National Science Appreciation Day =

Holiday in the United States

- Official name: National Science Appreciation Day
- Observed by: United States
- Type: National
- Significance: Commemorates the first successful clinical trials of first polio vaccine
- Observances: Celebration of scientific achievements, science awareness
- Date: 26 March
- Frequency: Annual
- First time: March 26, 2022
- Started by: ScienceSaves

National Science Appreciation Day is celebrated in the United States on March 26 of each year. It celebrates how science has benefited human outcomes, unleashed human potential, and transformed quality of life. The day presents an opportunity to express gratitude and to appreciate how science improves our everyday lives.

== History ==
National Science Appreciation Day has been established by the Center for Inquiry's ScienceSaves campaign in 2022. As of 2023, ten States had adopted official proclamations recognizing the commemoration: Arizona, Illinois, Kansas, Louisiana, New Hampshire, New Mexico, Oklahoma, Virginia, Washington and Wisconsin, as well as District of Columbia. By 2025, many more states had issued proclamations, including Arkansas, Colorado, Georgia, Idaho, Kentucky, Massachusetts, Michigan, Minnesota, North Carolina, North Dakota, Oregon, South Dakota, and Vermont.

The date has been chosen to commemorate the 1953 announcement by Jonas Salk of the first successful clinical trials of the first polio vaccine.

== Activities ==
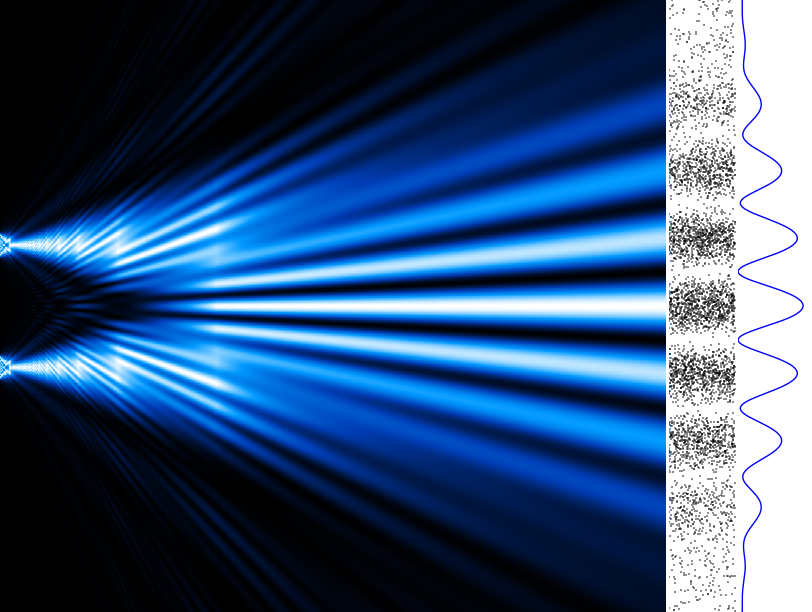
Double-slit experiment with electrons

On March 26, the public is invited to share stories of how scientific advances have improved or saved lives. Suggested activities include:

- Celebrate scientific achievements
- Give thanks to workers in every field of science and medicine
- Raise awareness of the importance of critical thinking
- Lobby for science in public policy
- Attend or host a science fair
- Visit a museum or science center and explore interactive workshops or exhibits
- Select a scientist, researcher, or inventor and read everything you can find about them
