= Science, Evolution, and Creationism =

Publication by the US National Academy of Sciences

- Publisher: United States National Academy of Sciences
- Publication date: January 3, 2008

Science, Evolution, and Creationism is a publication by the United States National Academy of Sciences. The book's authors intended to provide a current and comprehensive explanation of evolution and "its importance in the science classroom". It was "intended for use by scientists, teachers, parents, and school board members who wanted to engage in more constructive conversations with others who remain uncertain about evolution and its place in the public school curriculum." The book, published on January 3, 2008, is available as a free PDF file on the National Academies Press website.

Science, Evolution, and Creationism differs from prior National Academy of Sciences publications regarding creation and evolution in public education and the creation–evolution controversy; it is intended "specifically for the lay public", devoting much of its space to "explaining the differences between science and religion, and asserting that acceptance of evolution does not require abandoning belief in God." The book provides statements from notable biologists and clergy members to support the claim that "attempts to pit science and religion against each other create controversy where none needs to exist."

The authors of Science, Evolution, and Creationism, who include Francisco J. Ayala and Bruce Alberts, highlight developments in evolutionary biology and its relevance to the study of emerging infectious diseases, the 2006 discovery of the transitional fossil Tiktaalik, and the application of evolutionary theory in many areas of science and engineering beyond biology.

The book was released as several states, particularly Texas and Florida, considered revisions in state science standards.

A study at Arizona State University used the book as part of a two-week module, within an introductory biology course, focusing on science, evolution, and religion. The percentage of students who held the view that there was a conflict between religion and evolution was reduced by about half.

== Critical response ==
In an interview on NBC, Glenn Branch, deputy director of the National Center for Science Education, called the publication "a definitive statement from a leading scientific authority about the scientific bankruptcy of intelligent design creationism."

Praise for the publication was received from Lawrence Krauss and editorials in Nature, New Scientist, and several newspapers.
