= Center for Inquiry =

American nonprofit advocacy group

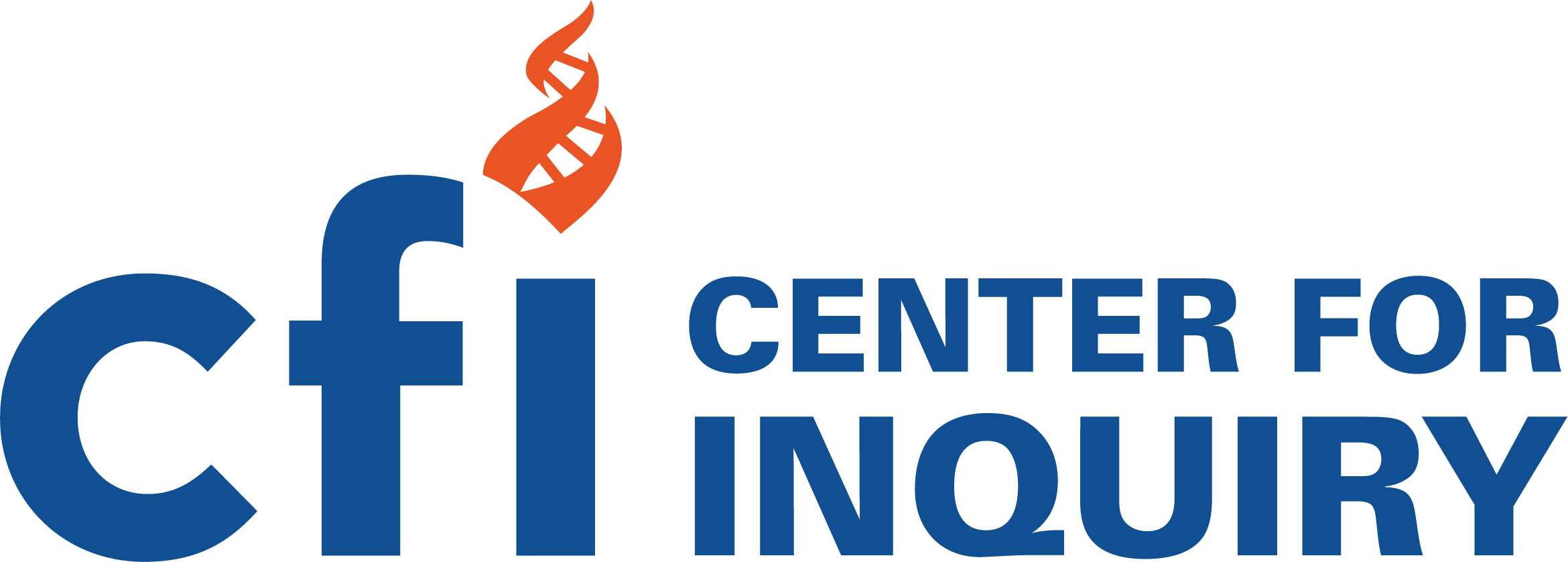

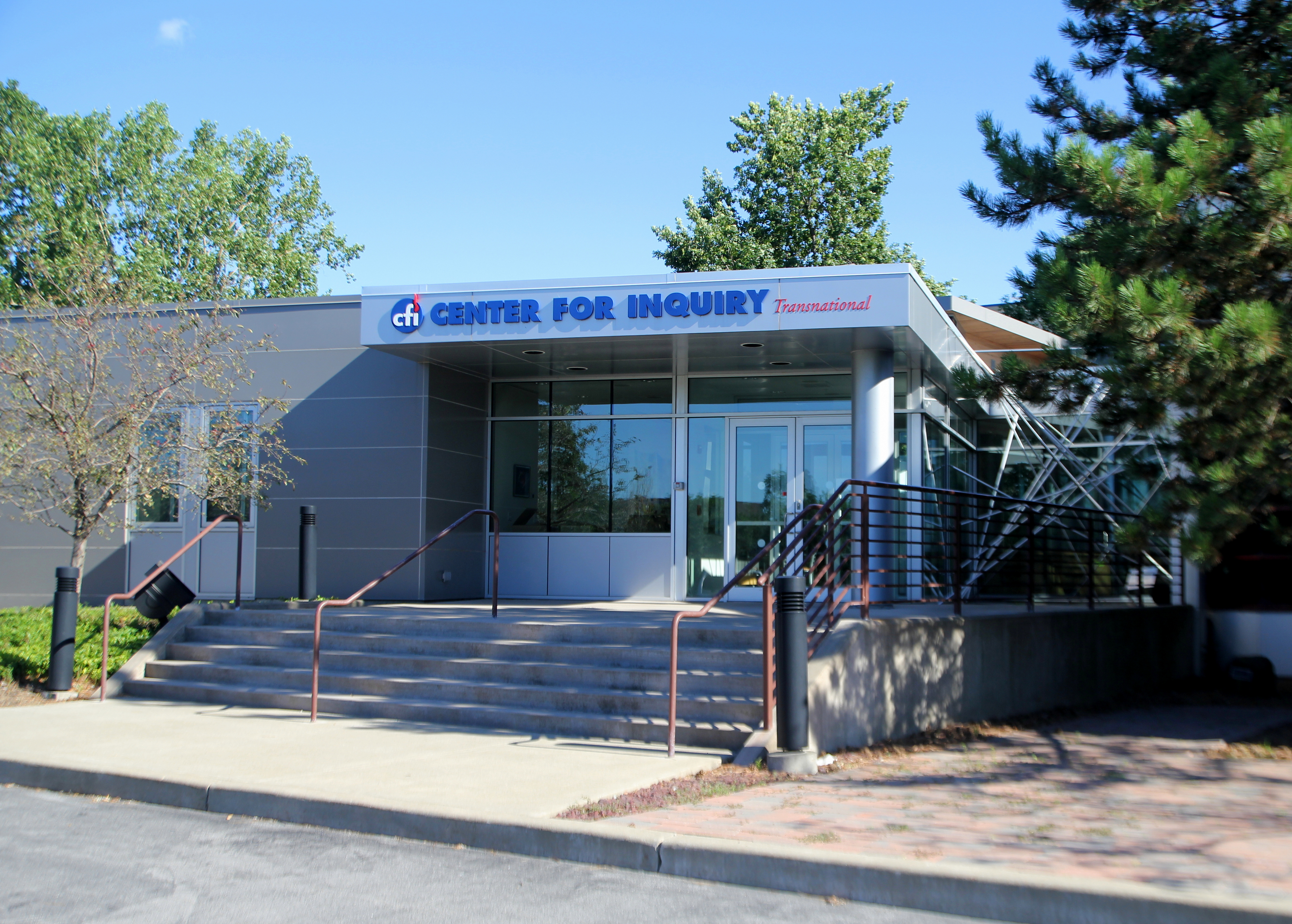
- Headquarters of the CFI
- Founded: 1991; 35 years ago
- Founder: Paul Kurtz
- Type: Nonprofit science education advocacy group
- Purpose: Public understanding of science, secular ethics, skepticism
- Location: Amherst, New York, U.S.
- Method: Research, education, outreach, and advocacy
- Key people: Robyn Blumner; Barry Karr
- Website: centerforinquiry.org

The Center for Inquiry (CFI) is an American 501(c)(3) nonprofit advocacy group that works to defend science and critical thinking and fight the influence of religion in government.

== History ==
The Center for Inquiry was established in 1991 by atheist philosopher and author Paul Kurtz. It brought together two organizations: the Committee for the Scientific Investigation of Claims of the Paranormal (founded by Kurtz in 1976) and the Council for Secular Humanism (founded by Kurtz in 1980). The Center for Inquiry Inc was registered as a tax-exempt nonprofit organization in April 2001.

Kurtz, a humanist who founded CFI to offer a positive alternative to religion, led the organization for thirty years. In 2009, Kurtz said he was forced out of CFI after conflict with Ronald A. Lindsay, a corporate lawyer hired to become CEO in 2008.

Robyn Blumner succeeded Lindsay as CEO in January 2016 when CFI announced that it was merging with the Richard Dawkins Foundation for Reason and Science.

== Committee for Skeptical Inquiry ==
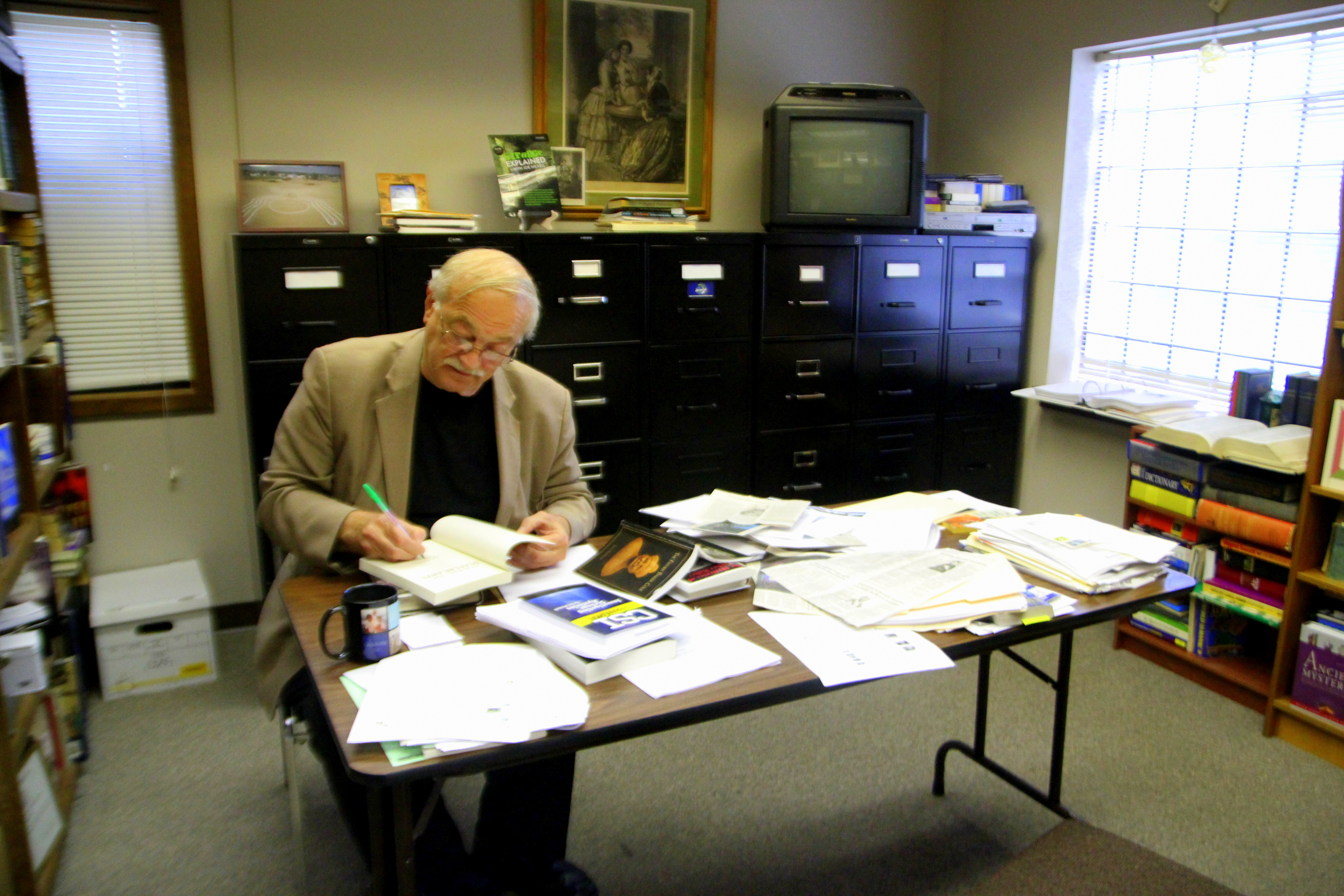
Joe Nickell, Research Fellow at the Committee for Skeptical Inquiry, in office. Amherst, New York, 2013.

Through the Committee for Skeptical Inquiry (CSI), and its journal, Skeptical Inquirer magazine, published by the Center for Inquiry, CSI examines evidential claims of the paranormal or supernormal, including psychics, ghosts, telepathy, clairvoyance, UFOs, and creationism. It also hosts the CSICon.

They also examine pseudoscientific claims involving vaccines, cellphones, power lines, GMOs, and alternative medicine. In the area of religion, they examine beliefs that involve testable claims, such as faith healing and creationism, but stay away from untestable religious beliefs such as the existence of God.

The Committee for Skeptical Inquiry (CSI), then known as the Committee for the Scientific Investigation of Claims of the Paranormal (CSICOP), was, alongside magician and prominent skeptic James Randi, sued by TV celebrity Uri Geller in the 1990s after Randi told a newspaper interviewer that Geller's tricks "are the kind that used to be on the back of cereal boxes when I was a kid." The case ran for several years, and was ultimately settled in 1995 with Geller ordered to pay the legal costs of Randi and CSICOP.

=== The Center for Inquiry Investigations Group ===
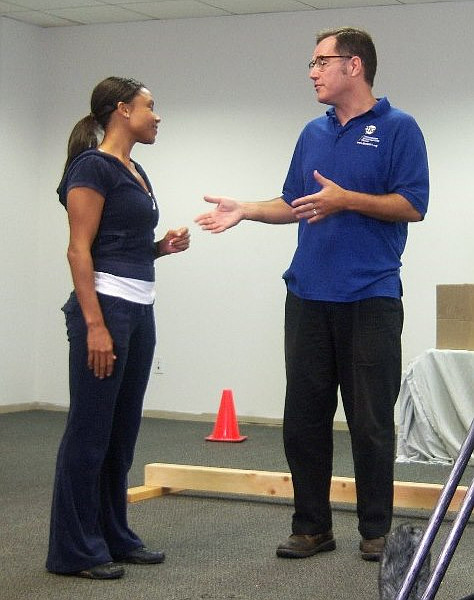
Dominique Dawes & James Underdown discuss testing of Power Balance bracelets

The Investigations Group (Formerly the Independent Investigations Group), a volunteer group based at CFI Los Angeles, undertakes experimental testing of fringe claims. It was founded by James Underdown, who is currently executive director of CFI West and a Fellow of the Committee for Skeptical Inquiry. The Group offers a cash prize of US$500,000 for successful demonstration of supernatural effects. This prize had been previously raised to US$250,000 when the IIG re-branded as the Center for Inquiry Investigations Group (CFIIG) in 2020 before it was raised again to the current amount.

The IIG Awards (known as "Iggies") are presented for "scientific and critical thinking in mainstream entertainment". IIG has investigated, among other things, power bracelets, psychic detectives, and a 'telepathic wonder dog'.

== Religion, ethics, and society ==
Logo of the Council for Secular Humanism (CSH)

The center promotes critical inquiry into the foundations and social effects of the world religions. Since 1983, initially through its connection with Committee for the Scientific Examination of Religion, it has focused on such issues as fundamentalism in Christianity and Islam, humanistic alternatives to religious ethics, and religious sources of political violence. It has taken part in protests against religious persecution around the world and opposes religious privilege, for example benefits for clergy in the US Tax Code. In 2014 and 2017, respectively, the CFI won two lawsuits compelling the states of Illinois and Indiana to allow weddings to be performed by officiants who are neither religious clergy nor government officials. A similar lawsuit challenging the constitutionality of marriage law in Texas was dismissed in August 2019.

CFI actively supports secular interests, such as secular state education. It organizes conferences, such as Women In Secularism and a conference focused on freethought advocate Robert Ingersoll. CFI has provided meeting and conference facilities to other skeptical organizations, for example an atheist of color conference on social justice.

CFI also undertakes atheist education and support activities, for example sending freethought books to prisoners as part of its Freethought Books Project.

CFI is active in advocating free speech, and in promoting secular government. It speaks against institutional religion in the armed forces.

Free Inquiry is published by the Center for Inquiry, in association with the Council for Secular Humanism (CSH). As of July, 2024, the magazine was edited by Ronald Lindsay.

== Publications ==
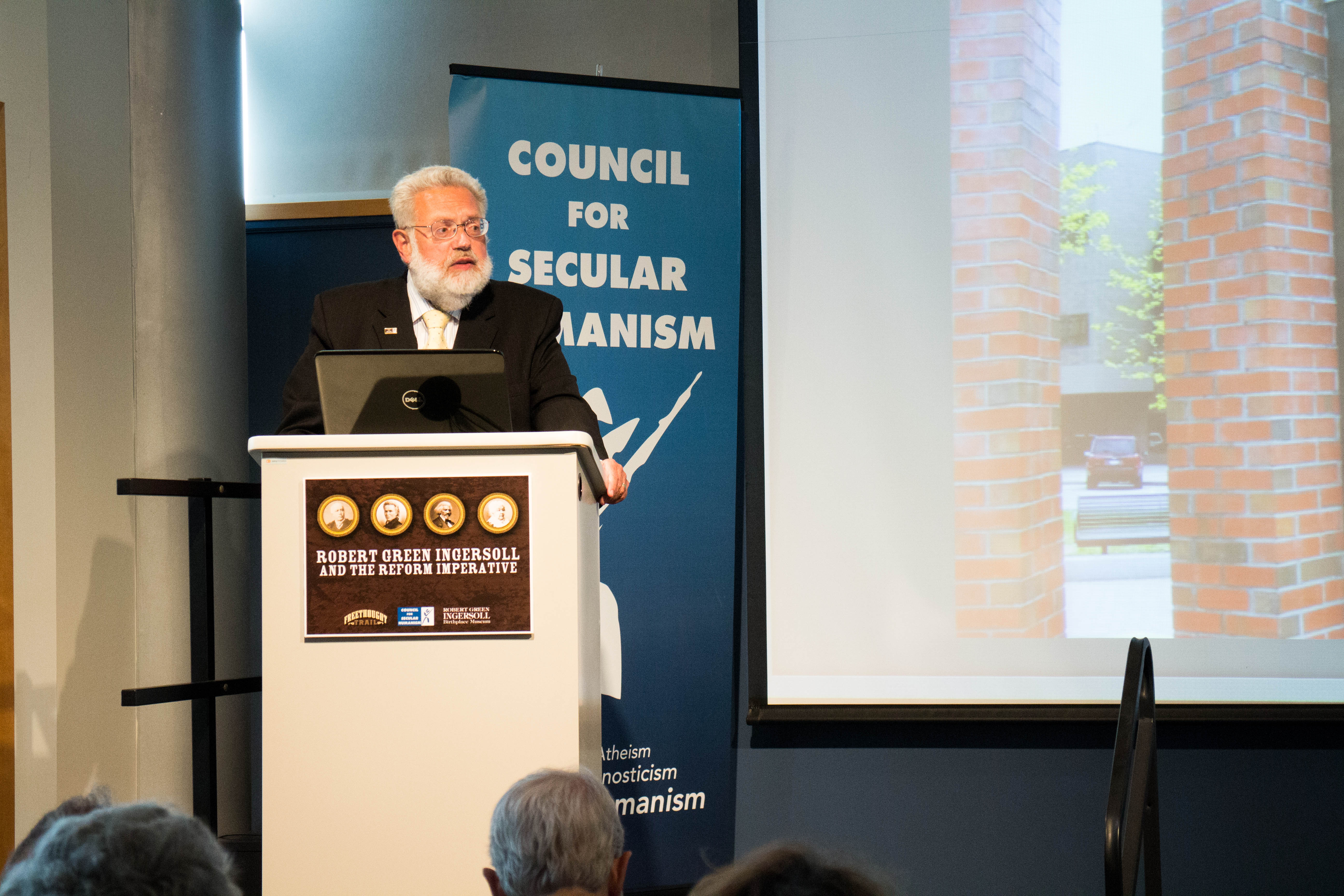
Tom Flynn, editor of Free Inquiry, gives a presentation on the Freethought Trail.

The results of research and activities supported by the center and its affiliates are published and distributed to the public in seventeen separate national and international magazines, journals, and newsletters. Among them are CSH's Free Inquiry and Secular Humanist Bulletin, and CSI's Skeptical Inquirer, CFI's American Rationalist. The Scientific Review of Alternative Medicine, The Scientific Review of Mental Health Practice and Philo, a journal covering philosophical issues, are no longer being published.

In June 2020, CFI announced the "newly launched CFI online publication", Pensar, "the Spanish language magazine for science, reason, and freethought." It is published by Alejandro Borgo, director of CFI Argentina.

CFI has produced the weekly radio show and podcast, Point of Inquiry, since 2005. Episodes are available free for download from iTunes. Its current hosts, as of June 2020, are Leighann Lord and James Underdown. Notable guests have included Steven Pinker, Neil deGrasse Tyson and Richard Dawkins.

== Projects and programs ==
=== Secular Rescue ===
The Center for Inquiry has an emergency fund called Secular Rescue, formerly known as the Freethought Emergency Fund. Between 2015 and 2018, Secular Rescue helped thirty individuals fleeing anti-secular regimes gain asylum.

=== Office of Public Policy ===
The Office of Public Policy (OPP) is the Washington, D.C., political arm of the Center for Inquiry. The OPP's mandate is to lobby Congress and the Administration on issues related to science and secularism. This includes defending the separation of church and state, promoting science and reason as the basis of public policy, and advancing secular values.

The OPP publishes position statements on its subjects of interest. Examples have included acupuncture, climate change, contraception and intelligent design. The Office is an active participant in legal matters, providing experts for Congress testimony and amicus briefs in Supreme Court cases. It publishes a list of bills it considers of interest as they pass through the U.S. legislative process.

=== "Science and the Public" Master of Education program ===
In partnership with the Graduate School of Education at the State University of New York at Buffalo, CFI offers an accredited Master of Education program in Science and the Public, available entirely online. The program is designed for students entering careers in research, science education, public policy, or science journalism, or pursuing further study in sociology, history and philosophy of science, science communication, education, or public administration. It analyzes the methods and outlook of science in relation to public culture, scientific literacy, and public policy.

=== Quackwatch ===
In February 2020, Quackwatch, founded by Stephen Barrett, became part of CFI, which announced it plans to maintain its various websites and to receive Barrett's library later in the year.

=== ScienceSaves ===
ScienceSaves is a nationwide pro-science campaign to generate an appreciation for the role of science. National Science Appreciation Day started in 2022 and is part of the ScienceSaves initiative and happens annually on March 26. In 2022, CFI got proclamations declaring March 26 as National Science Appreciation Day from more than a dozen states.

=== Teacher Institute for Evolutionary Science ===
This program provides teachers with tools to teach evolution.

== Richard Dawkins Award ==
The Richard Dawkins Award is an annual award that was presented by the Atheist Alliance of America up until July 2019, when it moved to the Center for Inquiry (CFI). According to the CFI press release, "The recipient will be a distinguished individual from the worlds of science, scholarship, education or entertainment, who publicly proclaims the values of secularism and rationalism, upholding scientific truth wherever it may lead". The award has been presented since 2003, and is named after Richard Dawkins, an English evolutionary biologist who was named the world's top thinker in a 2013 reader's poll of Prospect magazine.

== Past projects and programs ==
The following projects and programs are no longer active.

=== Camp Inquiry ===
The Center for Inquiry organized an annual summer camp for children called Camp Inquiry, focusing on scientific literacy, critical thinking, naturalism, the arts, humanities, and humanist ethical development. Camp Inquiry has been described as "a summer camp for kids with questions" where spooky stories were followed by "reverse engineering sessions" as the participants were encouraged to determine the cause of an apparently supernatural experience. Camp Inquiry has been criticised as "Jesus Camp in reverse"; its organisers countered that the camp is not exclusive to atheist children and that campers are encouraged to draw their own conclusions based on empirical and critical thinking.

=== CFI Institute ===
The Center for Inquiry Institute offered undergraduate level online courses, seminars, and workshops in critical thinking and the scientific outlook and its implications for religion, human values, and the borderlands of science. In addition to transferable undergraduate credit through the University at Buffalo system, CFI offered a thirty-credit-hour Certificate of Proficiency in Critical Inquiry. The three-year curriculum plan offered summer sessions at the main campus at the University at Buffalo in Amherst, New York.

=== Medicine and health ===
The Commission for Scientific Medicine and Mental Health (CSMMH) stimulated critical scientific scrutiny of New Age medicine and the schools of psychotherapy. It supported naturalistic addiction recovery practices through Secular Organizations for Sobriety. CFI challenges the claims of alternative medicine and advocates a scientific basis for healthcare. CSMMH papers have covered topics such as pseudoscience in autism treatments and in psychiatry.

=== Naturalism Research Project ===
CFI also ran the Naturalism Research Project, a major effort to develop the theoretical and practical applications of philosophical naturalism. As part of this project, CFI's libraries, research facilities, and conference areas were available to scientists and scholars to advance the understanding of science's methodologies and conclusions about naturalism.

Activities of the Naturalism Research Project included lectures and seminars by visiting fellows and scholars; academic conferences; and support CFI publications of important research. Among the central issues of naturalism include the exploration of varieties of naturalism; problems in philosophy of science; the methodologies of scientific inquiry; naturalism and humanism; naturalistic ethics; planetary ethics; and naturalism and the biosciences.

== Organization and locations ==
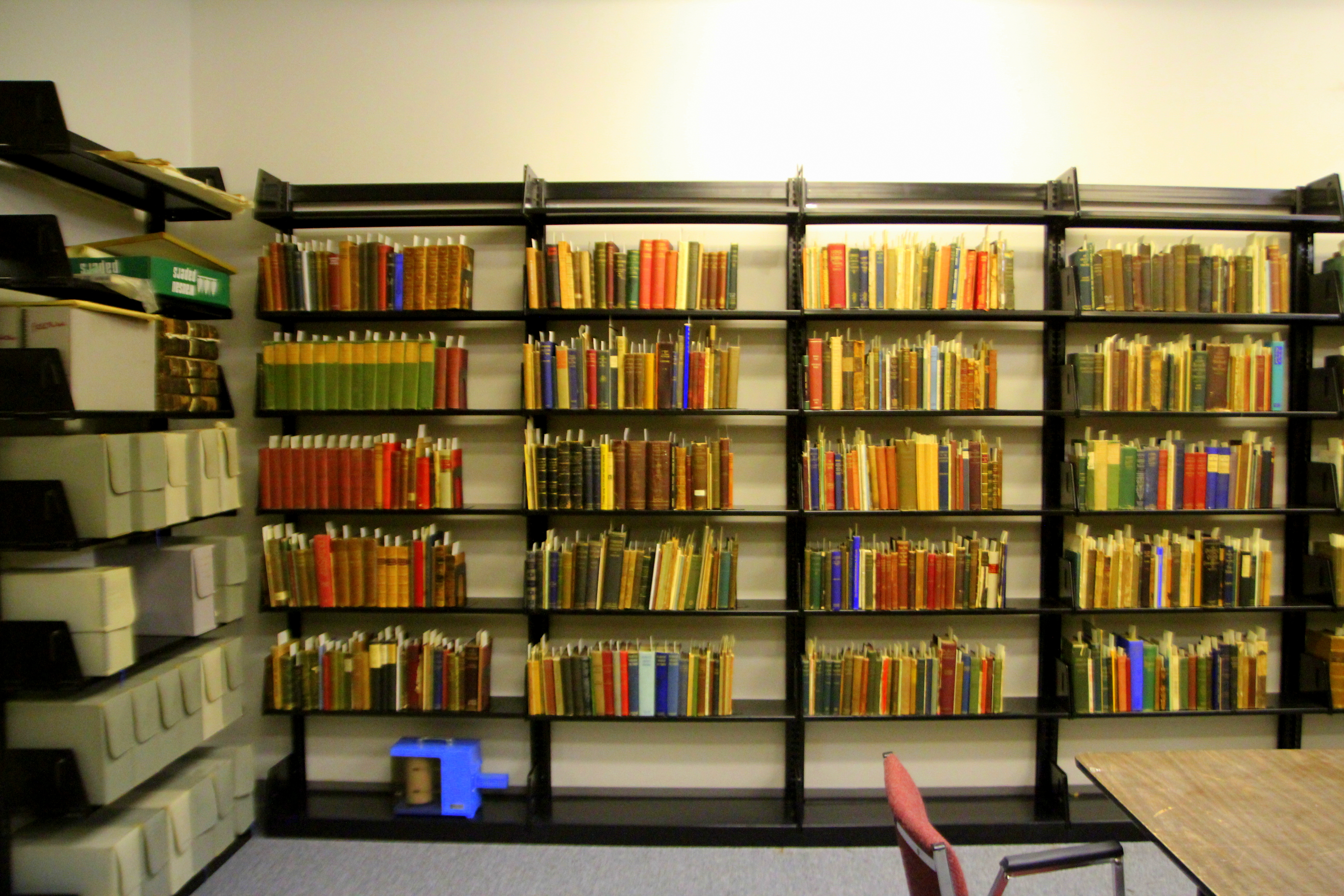
CFI's Rare Book Room, located at their Amherst, New York Headquarters

CFI is a nonprofit body registered as a charity in the United States. It has 17 locations in the U.S., and has 16 international branches or affiliated organizations. The organization has Centers For Inquiry in Amherst, New York (its headquarters), Los Angeles, The Steve Allen Theater, New York City, Tampa Bay, Washington, D.C., Indiana, Austin, Chicago, San Francisco and Michigan.

=== International activities ===
CFI has branches, representation or affiliated organizations in countries around the world. It organizes its international activities under the banner Center For Inquiry Transnational. In addition, CFI holds consultative status to the United Nations as an NGO under the UN Economic and Social Council. The center participates in UN Human Rights Council debates, for example a debate on the subject of female genital mutilation during 2014.

=== University exchange programs ===
International programs exist in Germany (Rossdorf), France (Nice), Spain (Bilbao), Poland (Warsaw), Nigeria (Ibadan), Uganda (Kampala), Kenya (Nairobi), Nepal (Kathmandu), India (Pune and Hyderabad), Egypt (Cairo), China (Beijing), New Zealand (Auckland), Peru (Lima), Argentina (Buenos Aires), Senegal (Dakar), Zambia (Lusaka), and Bangladesh (Dhaka).

=== Centre for Inquiry Canada ===
CFI Canada (CFIC) is the Canadian branch of CFI Transnational, headquartered in Toronto, Ontario, Canada. Justin Trottier served as National Executive Director from 2007 to 2011. Originally established and supported in part by CFI Transnational, CFI Canada has become an independent Canadian national organization with several provincial branches. CFI Canada has branches in Halifax, Montreal, Ottawa, Toronto, Saskatoon, Calgary, Okanagan (Kelowna), and Vancouver.

== Affiliate organizations ==
=== List of affiliates ===
Organizations affiliated with the Center for Inquiry include:

- Centre for Inquiry Canada
- Centre for Inquiry UK (list of lectures by the Centre for Inquiry UK on YouTube)
- Institute for the Secularisation of Islamic Society (see below)
- Committee for Skeptical Inquiry (CSI)
- Committee for the Scientific Examination of Religion (CSER)
- Commission for Scientific Medicine and Mental Health Practice (CSMMH)
- International Academy of Humanism
- Richard Dawkins Foundation for Reason and Science

=== Institute for the Secularisation of Islamic Society ===
The Institute for the Secularisation of Islamic Society (ISIS) is an organization of writers that promotes the ideas of secularism, democracy and human rights within Islamic society. Founded in 1998 by former Muslims, the best known being Ibn Warraq, the group aims to combat theologically driven fanaticism, violence and terrorism. The organization subscribes to the rule of secular law, freedom of speech and the Universal Declaration of Human Rights. It does not promote any belief system or religious dogma.

== In the media and controversies ==
CFI participates in media debates on science, health, religion and its other areas of interest. Its "Keep Healthcare Safe and Secular" campaign promotes scientifically sound healthcare. It has been an outspoken critic of dubious and unscientific healthcare practices, and engages in public debate on the merit and legality of controversial medical techniques. In 2014, CEO Ron Lindsay publicly criticized Stanislaw Burzynski's controversial Texas cancer clinic.

CFI campaigns for a secular society, for example in opposing the addition of prayer text on public property. The center supports secular and free speech initiatives.

On November 14, 2006, the CFI opened its Office of Public Policy in Washington, DC, and issued a declaration "In Defense of Science and Secularism", which calls for public policy to be based on science rather than faith. The next day The Washington Post ran an article about it entitled "Think Tank Will Promote Thinking".

In 2011, video expert James Underdown of IIG and CFI Los Angeles conducted an experiment for the Oprah Winfrey Network program "Miracle Detective", precisely replicating the angelic apparition claimed to have cured a severely disabled 14-year-old at Presbyterian Hemby Children's Hospital in Charlotte, North Carolina. The "angel" was sunlight from a hidden window, and the girl remained handicapped.

=== Consumer fraud lawsuits against CVS and Walmart ===
In July 2018, CFI filed suit against CVS in the District of Columbia for consumer fraud over its sale and marketing of ineffective homeopathic medicine. The lawsuit in part accused the CVS of deceiving consumers through its misrepresentation of homeopathy's safety and effectiveness, wasting customers' money and putting their health at risk. Nicholas Little, CFI's Vice President and General Counsel said, "CVS is taking cynical advantage of their customers' confusion and trust in the CVS brand, and putting their health at risk to make a profit and they can't claim ignorance. If the people in charge of the country's largest pharmacy don't know that homeopathy is bunk, they should be kept as far away from the American healthcare system as possible." In May 2019, CFI announced that they have filed a similar suit against Walmart for their range of homeopathic products. In July 2019, CFI announced that the Stiefel Freethought Foundation was contributing an additional $150,000 to the previously committed $100,000 to support the two lawsuits. In 2020 both cases were dismissed. In September 2022 the District of Columbia's Court of Appeals revived the lawsuits.

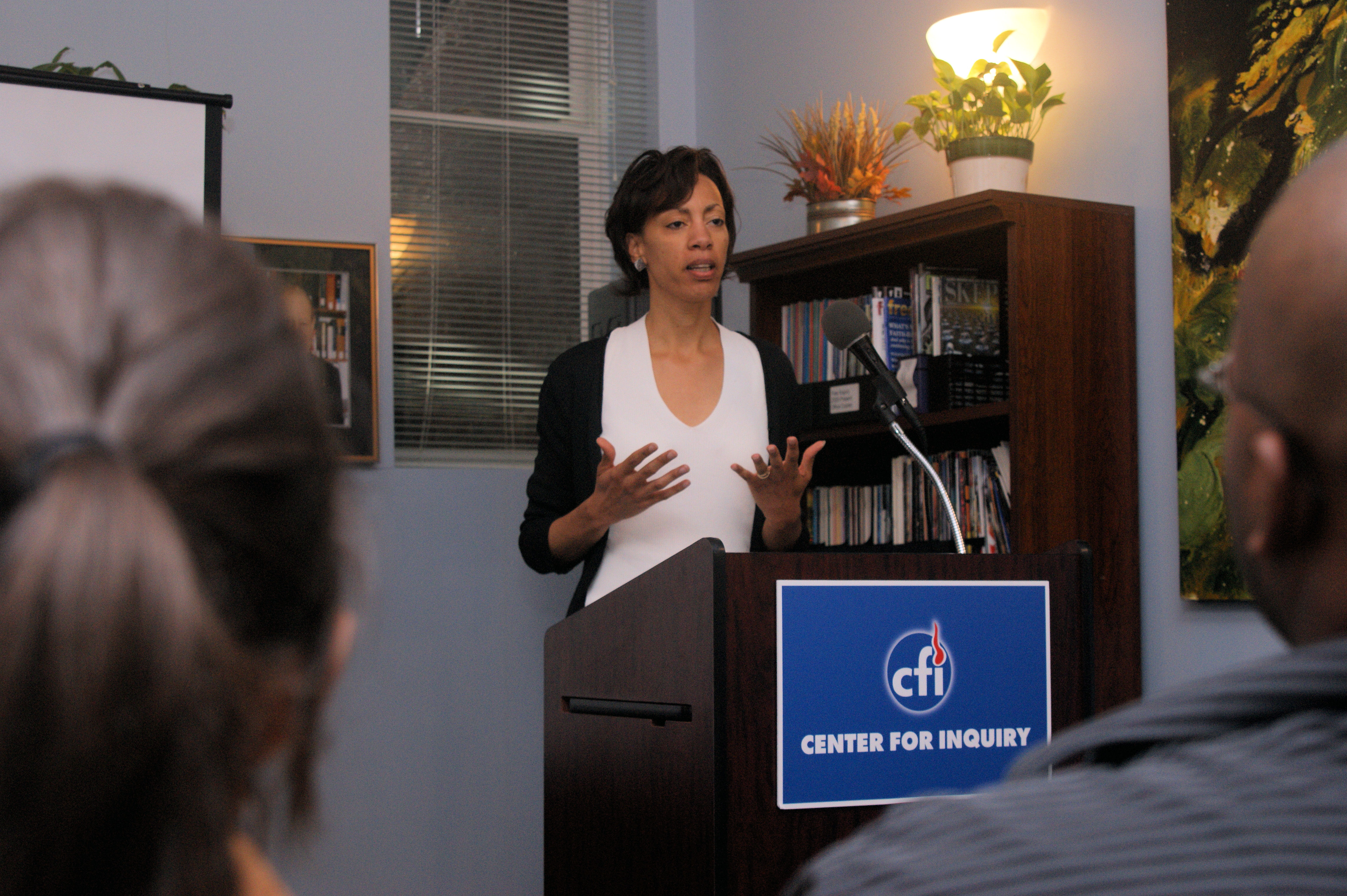
Sikivu Hutchinson speaking at the Center for Inquiry, Washington, DC, in 2010

=== Lack of racial diversity on its board of directors ===
In 2016, the atheist Sikivu Hutchinson criticized the merger of the secular organizations Center for Inquiry and the Richard Dawkins Foundation for Reason and Science, which gave Richard Dawkins a seat on the board of directors of the Center for Inquiry. Her criticism was that both organizations had all white boards of directors.

=== Wyndgate Country Club and Richard Dawkins, 2011 ===
During Richard Dawkins' October 2011 book tour, Center for Inquiry – the tour's sponsor – signed a contract with Wyndgate Country Club in Rochester Hills, Michigan, as the venue site. After seeing an interview with Dawkins on The O'Reilly Factor, an official at the club cancelled Dawkins' appearance. Dawkins said that the country club official accepted Bill O'Reilly's "twisted" interpretation of his book The Magic of Reality without having read it personally. Sean Faircloth said that cancelling the reading "really violates the basic principles of America ... The Civil Rights Act ... prohibits discrimination based on race or religious viewpoint. ... [Dawkins has] published numerous books ... to explain science to the public, so it's rather an affront, to reason in general, to shun him as they did." CFI Michigan executive director Jeff Seaver stated that "This action by The Wyndgate illustrates the kind of bias and bigotry that nonbelievers encounter all the time." Following the cancellation, protests and legal action by CFI against the Wyndgate Country Club were pursued. In 2013 this case was settled in favor of the Center For Inquiry.

=== CSH actions against faith-based initiatives ===
In 2007, CSH sued the Florida Department of Corrections (DOC) to block the use of state funds in contracts to faith-based programs for released inmates, claiming that this use is prohibited under the "No Aid" provision or Blaine amendment of the Florida constitution. The initial decision found in favor of the DOC but, on appeal, the case was remanded in 2010 on just the issue of the unconstitutionality of appropriating state funds for this purpose.

While this case was in progress, after the appellate finding, Republican legislators began an effort to amend the Florida constitution to remove the language of the Blaine amendment, succeeding in 2011 to place the measure on the 2012 ballot as amendment 8. The ballot measure failed.

In 2015, CHS (now CFI) and the state (along with its co-defendants) both filed for summary judgement. The court granted the state's motion in January, 2016, allowing the contested contracting practice to continue. After consideration, CFI announced in February, 2016, that it would not appeal.

=== Heckled at the UN ===
CFI representative Josephine Macintosh was repeatedly interrupted and heckled by the delegation from Saudi Arabia whilst presenting the center's position on censorship at the UN Human Rights Council. CFI advocated free speech, and opposed the punishment by Saudi authorities of Raif Badawi for running an Internet forum, whom they accused of atheism and liberalism. CFI's statement was supported by the American, Canadian, Irish, and French delegates.

=== Blasphemy Day ===
Blasphemy Rights Day International encourages individuals and groups to openly express their criticism of or outright contempt for religion. It was founded in 2009 by the Center for Inquiry. A student contacted the Center for Inquiry in Amherst, New York, to present the idea, which CFI then supported. Ronald Lindsay, president and CEO of the Center for Inquiry, said regarding Blasphemy Day, "We think religious beliefs should be subject to examination and criticism just as political beliefs are, but we have a taboo on religion", in an interview with CNN. It takes place every September 30 to coincide with the anniversary of the publications of the controversial Jyllands-Posten Muhammad cartoons.

Blasphemy Day and CFI's related Blasphemy Contests started (in CFI's own words) "a firestorm of controversy". The use of confrontational free speech has been a topic of debate within the Humanist movement and cited as an example of a wider move towards New Atheism and away from the more conciliatory approach historically associated with Humanism.
