= Texas Public Information Act =

The Texas Public Information Act is a series of laws incorporated into the Texas Government Code that serve to ensure the public has access to information held by the state government. The act is analogous to the United States Freedom of Information Act which guarantees the accessibility of information held by federal government agencies to the public.

== Description of statute ==
The Texas Public Information Act is a series of legislative acts that have been incorporated into the Texas Government Code in Title 5, Subchapter A Subtitle 552. The act is intended to guarantee public access to governmental information in the interest of providing transparency in government.

Several online resources, including the state attorney general's website, provide information on how to make use of the Public Information Act to obtain state government information and what procedures one should follow when making an information request.

== Notable cases ==
- In August 2015, the State Fair of Texas was sanctioned more than $75,000 for filing a SLAPP suit against a lawyer who had requested financial documents from the state fair pursuant to the Texas Public Information Act. On August 2, 2016, the Dallas Court of Appeals reversed in its entirety the judgment against the State Fair of Texas, holding that the trial court erred in, among other things, finding that the state fair's lawsuit was a SLAPP suit.
