= Robyn Blumner =

American opinion columnist and civil rights lawyer (born 1961)

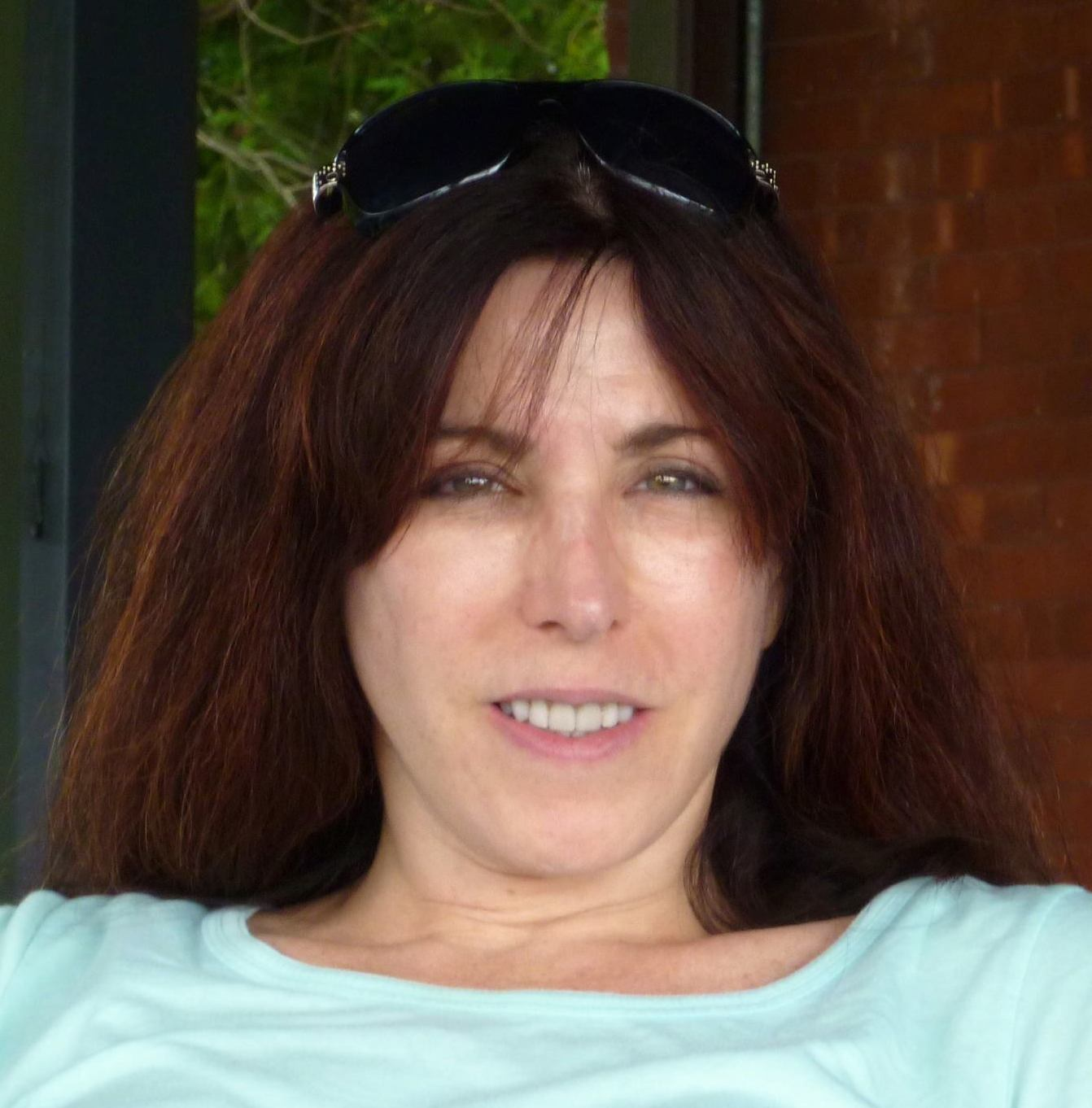
- Blumner in 2013
- Born: Robyn Ellen Blumner; May 14, 1961 (age 65); New York City, U.S.
- Education: Cornell University (BA); New York University (JD)
- Occupations: Journalist, author, president and CEO at Center for Inquiry
- Known for: Center For Inquiry; Richard Dawkins Foundation for Reason and Science; American Civil Liberties Union

Robyn Ellen Blumner (born May 14, 1961) is an American attorney, civil rights expert and the current president and chief executive officer (CEO) of the secular educational organization Center for Inquiry (CFI) and executive director of the Richard Dawkins Foundation for Reason and Science. She holds a J.D. degree and worked for several years as director of local affiliates of the American Civil Liberties Union advocating for civil liberties and civil rights before becoming a newspaper columnist and editorial writer in Florida.

== Early life and education ==
Blumner was born May 14, 1961, in Queens, New York City. Her parents were teachers and politically active union members, her mother being a registered Democrat, her father being an independent voter who occasionally voted Republican. Her grandmother had been awarded a law degree but had not practised, as women in those days were unable to obtain an apprenticeship to practice law.

Both her parents were Jewish, with her father actively practising. In an interview with the Richard Dawkins Foundation she states that she began questioning religion around the age of 11, stopped attending Hebrew school and did not have a Bat Mitzvah. Nevertheless, she acknowledges a shared Jewish identity and said: "A belief in god is not essential to being Jewish. Humanist values were far more important than religious practice to Jewish identity."

She was raised in Glen Cove, Long Island, and became interested in politics from a young age, leafleting for Senator George McGovern during his 1972 presidential campaign and organizing the Young Democrats while at school. In 1982 she was awarded a B.A. degree in Industrial and labor relations from Cornell University. From there, she went to New York University School of Law and in 1985 completed a J.D. degree. While studying for that degree, she began working for the American Federation of State, County, and Municipal Employees and the Staten Island Rapid Transit Operating Authority, where she became assistant director of labor-management relations.

Around the same time, Blumner first became active as a volunteer in the American Civil Liberties Union where she became absorbed by The Reproductive Freedom Project and soon decided that civil liberties was a field she wanted to pursue.

== Career ==
=== Civil liberties ===
From 1987, Blumner held the position of executive director at the American Civil Liberties Union In Utah where she frequently acted as spokesperson on topics such as freedom of speech (including for white supremacists such as Aryan Nations) and abortion rights.

From 1989, she was director of the ACLU for Florida where she campaigned on various civil liberties issues such as reproductive rights, right to demonstrate, First Amendment rights and sexual discrimination. That organization gave her the Gardner W. Beckett, Jr. Civil Liberties Award in 2001 and the Irene Miller Vigilance in Journalism Award in 2010 to honor her work.

Controversially, while with the ACLU, Blumner stated she is against affirmative action (also referred to as positive discrimination), saying: "I can no longer sit silently while my cohorts defend a discriminatory policy that favors groups of people solely on their gender, skin color or national origin...An advantage granted me due to my sex demeans my individuality, reducing me to a walking immutable characteristic."

=== Journalism ===
From 1998 to 2014, Blumner was an opinion writer for the Tampa Bay Times (formerly the St. Petersburg Times), was syndicated in papers across the country and is described as a columnist and editorial writer. In 2012 Blumner, along with John Hill, Joni James and Tim Nickens, was a finalist for the Pulitzer Prize for Editorial Writing for their work at the Tampa Bay Times in conducting an extensive investigation of a state governor and the effects of his inexperience on the state.

Blumner is an author and contributor to several publications, including Center for Inquiry in association with the Council for Secular Humanism and Time magazine in her capacity as CEO and president of CFI, and for her experience in civil liberties. She has contributed essays and forewords to several published works by other authors.

From 2008 to 2009, she was also a regular contributor to Huffington Post.

=== Science education and secularism ===
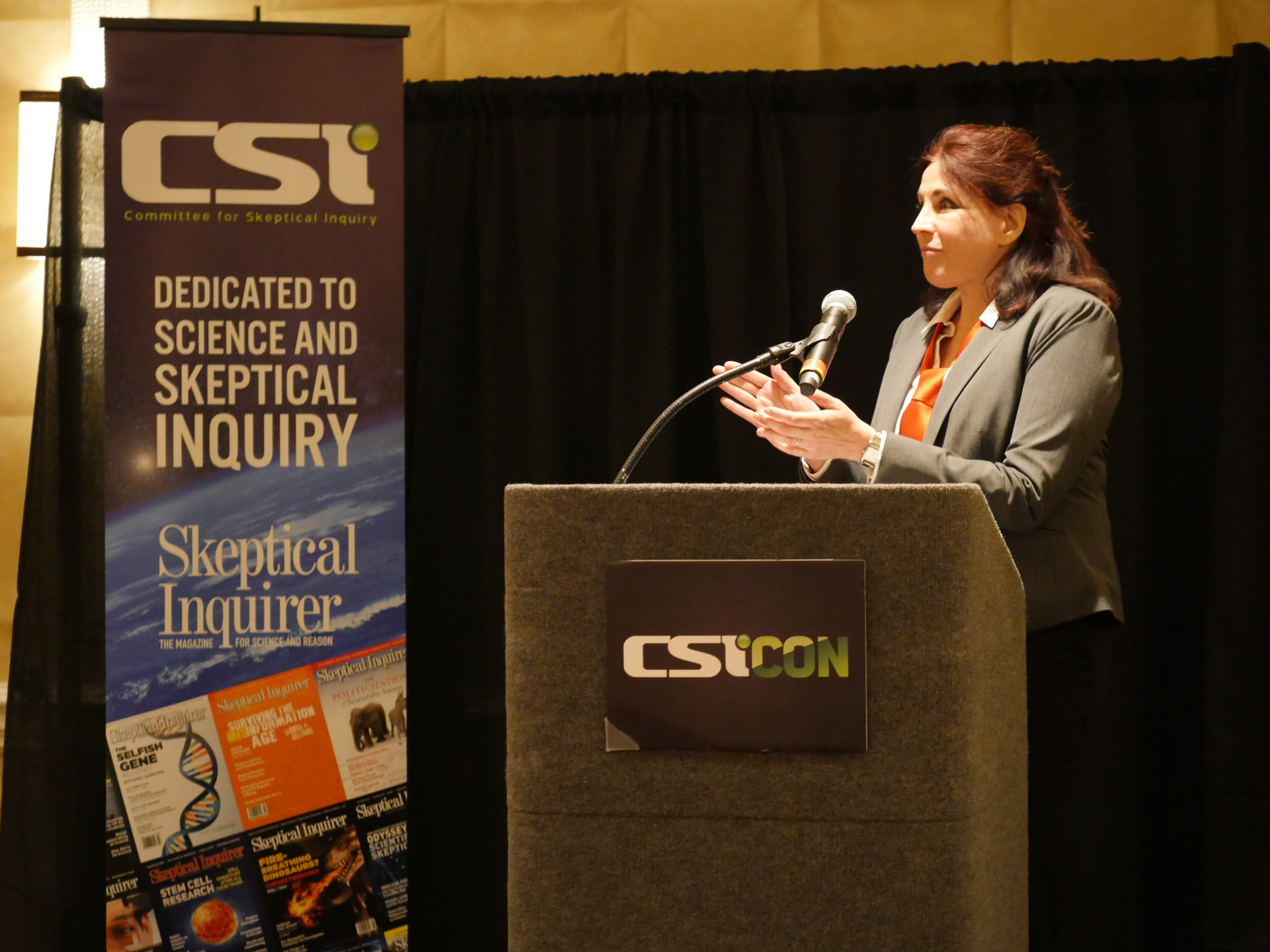
Blumner speaking at CSICon in 2017

In 2004, Blumner was awarded the Emperor Has No Clothes Award from the Freedom From Religion Foundation, which describes it as an “award celebrating ‘plain speaking’ on the shortcomings of religion by public figures.”

In February 2014, Blumner joined the Richard Dawkins Foundation for Reason and Science (RDFRS) as executive director, replacing interim director Edwina Rogers who in 2013 had been director of the Secular Coalition for America when it and RDFRS formed a partnership.

In 2016, following the merger of the RDFRS with the Center for Inquiry, Blumner took over from Ronald A. Lindsay as CEO and president of CFI, a position which Hemant Mehta speculated would make her “one of the most powerful women in the world of organized atheism.”

Blumner regularly speaks at science education, secular and atheist conferences including CSICon, Reason Rally, Apostacon and DLD.

In 2016, as president of the Center for Inquiry, Blumner championed a new global initiative called Secular Rescue which aims to protect and provide emergency support to non-believers, atheists and apostates, if necessary giving them an escape route from violence and death threats as well as diplomatic and legal assistance. "It’s really an underground railroad of sorts for non-believers in countries where simply expressing doubt about religious belief is a criminal offense or where it may lead to grave physical harm." Blumner addressed the 36th Session of the UN Human Rights Council in Geneva on September 20, 2017, following a surge in discrimination against atheists in Malaysia, bringing pressure to bear on the issue of freedom of conscience. As of January 2018, Secular Rescue claims to have provided emergency aid to 30 individuals, including PEN Pinter Prize-winning writer Ahmedur Rashid Chowdhury.

== Personal life ==
Blumner describes herself as an atheist, a secularist and a liberal. She is married and lives in Washington, DC.
