= Phylotypic stage =

In embryology a phylotypic stage or phylotypic period is a particular developmental stage or developmental period during mid-embryogenesis where embryos of related species within a phylum express the highest degree of morphological and molecular resemblance. Recent molecular studies in various plant and animal species quantified the expression of genes covering crucial stages of embryo development and found that during the morphologically defined phylotypic period the evolutionary oldest genes, genes with similar temporal expression patterns, and genes under strongest purifying selection are most active throughout the phylotypic period.

== Historical origins of concept ==
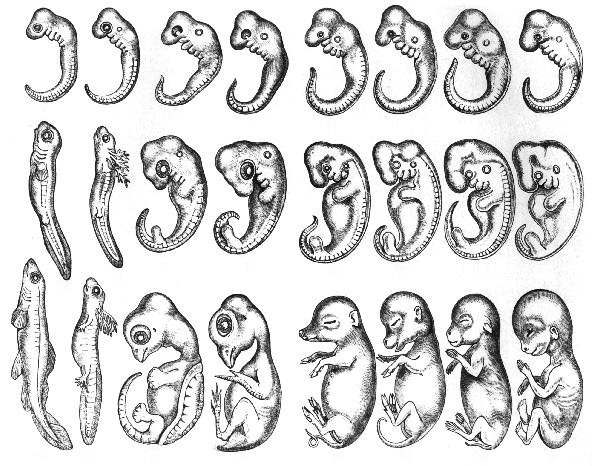
Haeckel's drawings, reproduced by G.J. Romanes in 1892. Early embryologists, including Haeckel and von Baer, noted that embryos of different animals pass through a similar stage in which they resemble one another very closely.

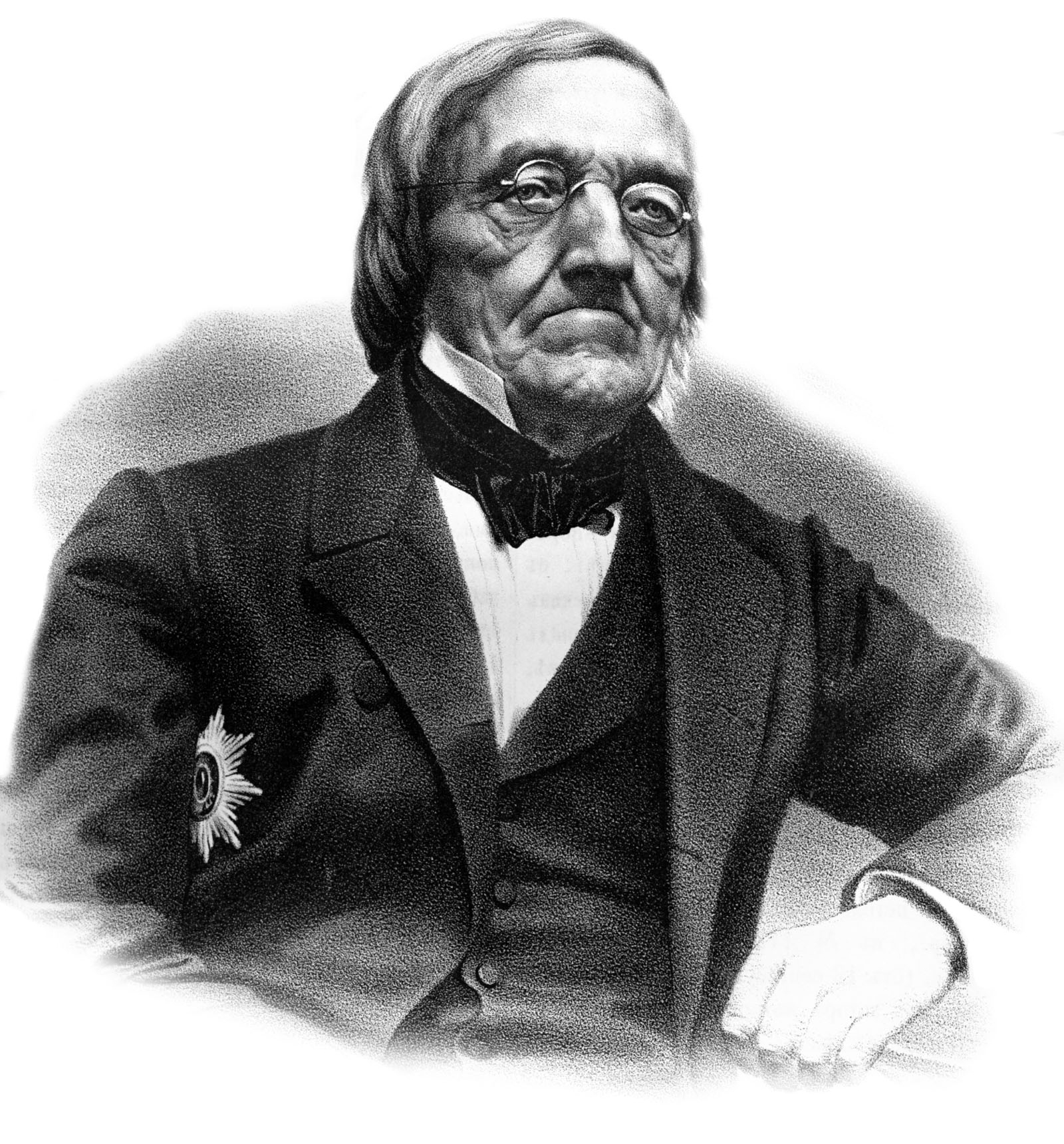
Karl Ernst von Baer, whose third law of embryology gave the basis for the idea of the phylotypic stage

The idea that embryos of different species have similar morphologies at some point during development can be traced back to Aristotle. Aristotle observed a number of developing vertebrate embryos, noting in his text The Generation of Animals that the morphological differences among the different embryos arose late in development. In 1828, Karl Ernst von Baer created his laws of embryology, which summarized the results of his comparative embryogenesis studies. In his first law, he proposed that the more general characters of a group appear earlier in their embryos than the more special characters. In 1866, Ernst Haeckel proposed that each developing organism passes through the evolutionary stages of its ancestors, i.e., ontogeny recapitulates phylogeny. The hypothesis that different organisms pass through the developmental stages of closely related organisms is outdated. However, the idea that early stages of development are conserved among species, with increasing divergence as development progresses, has influenced modern evolutionary and developmental biology. The early conservation or funnel model of development (see below) is closely tied to these historical origins.

== Phylotypic period ==
The first formulation of the phylotypic period concept came in 1960 from Friedrich Seidel's Körpergrundgestalt, which translates to "basic body shape." In 1977, Cohen defined the phyletic stage as the first stage that reveals the general characters shared by all members of that phylum. Klaus Sander revised this concept in 1983 and named it the phylotypic stage, which is "the stage of greatest similarity between forms which, during evolution, have differently specialized both in their modes of adult life and with respect to the earliest stages of ontogenesis." Note that this definition demonstrates his support for the hourglass model (see below). Recent papers refer to the phylotypic period, or the phylotypic stage, as a period of maximal similarity between species within each animal phylum.

While this concept was originally devised using morphological comparisons of developing embryos from different species, the period of maximal similarity has recently been identified using molecular evidence. The phylotypic period has been identified using conservation of gene expression, estimates of gene age, gene sequence conservation, the expression of regulatory genes and transcription factors, and the interconnectivity of genes and proteins.

== Funnel and hourglass models ==
The funnel model is the hypothesis that the most conserved stage of development (the phylotypic period) occurs at the beginning of embryogenesis, with increasing divergence as development progresses. This is also known as the early conservation model of development.

Evidence for an alternative model arose from careful comparisons of the temporal divergence in morphology of the embryos of different species. For example, Klaus Sander noticed that the "incredible variation in larvae and adults" of insects occurs after they "develop from nearly identical rudiments in the germ band stage." The most conserved stage of development, the germ band stage, occurs near the middle of development rather than at the beginning, supporting a mid-developmental period of maximal similarity between species. This model, called the hourglass model, is the idea that early embryos of different species display divergent forms but their morphologies converge in the middle of development, followed by a period of increasing divergence.

=== Support for hourglass model ===
Contrary to the early morphological work by von Baer and Haeckel, recent morphological studies have demonstrated the greatest divergence among closely related species both early in development (gastrulation) and late in development, supporting the hourglass model. Further support for the hourglass model came from the discovery that Hox genes, a group of sequentially activated genes that regulate anterior-posterior body axis formation, are activated during the middle of development at the phylotypic stage. Because these genes are highly conserved and are involved in body axis formation, the activation of Hox genes could be an important player in the heightened conservation among embryos of closely related species during mid-development.

The advent of next-generation sequencing enabled scientists to use molecular methods to identify the period of development that has the most conserved gene expression patterns among different species. In 2010, two studies found molecular evidence that supports the hourglass model. Kalinka et al. sequenced the transcriptome of six Drosophila species over developmental time, identifying the most conserved gene expression in mid-development during the arthropod germ band developmental stage. Genes that were enriched in the developing embryos at the germ band stage are involved in cellular and organismal development. Domazet-Lošo and Tautz analyzed the transcriptome of zebrafish (Danio rerio) over developmental time, from unfertilized eggs to adults. They used a method called genomic phylostratigraphy to estimate the age of each gene during development. In zebrafish, as well as in additional transcriptomic datasets of Drosophila, the mosquito Anopheles and the nematode Caenorhabditis elegans, the authors found that genes expressed during mid-development are older than those expressed at the beginning and end of development, supporting the hourglass model.

Other recent genomic studies have supported a mid-developmental phylotypic stage in vertebrates and in the plant Arabidopsis thaliana, as well as in brown algae. The temporal gene expression profiles for a developing mouse (Mus musculus), chicken (Gallus gallus), frog (Xenopus laevis) and zebrafish (Danio rerio) revealed that the most conserved gene expression in vertebrates occurs in mid-development at the pharyngular embryo stage. The pharyngula stage occurs when the four distinguishing features of vertebrates (notochord, dorsal hollow nerve cord, post-anal tail, and a series of paired branchial slits) have developed.

=== Support for early conservation (funnel) model ===
Recent molecular data also provide support for the early conservation model. For example, Piasecka et al. re-analyzed the zebrafish dataset published by Domazet-Lošo and Tautz. They found that applying a log-transformation to the gene expression data changed the results to support highest conservation in early development. Further, after clustering the zebrafish gene expression data into "transcription modules" reflecting each stage of development, they found multiple lines of evidence supporting the early conservation model (gene sequence, age, gene family size, and expression conservation) while only the analysis of gene regulatory regions supported the hourglass model.

One hypothesis for the evolutionary conservation during the phylotypic period is that it is a period characterized by a high level of interactions as the body plan is being established. In zebrafish, the interconnectivity of proteins over developmental time was found to be highest in early development, supporting the early conservation model. Another way to examine the point in development at which developmental constraints are the strongest is through experimental gene loss, because the removal of a gene should be more deleterious when it is expressed at a developmental stage with stronger evolutionary constraints. Gene knockout experiments from mice and zebrafish demonstrated that the ratio of essential genes to non-essential genes decreases over developmental time, suggesting that there are stronger constraints in early development that are relaxed over time. Despite increasing evidence supporting the hourglass model, identifying the point in development that is most conserved among species with a phylum (the phylotypic period) is a controversy in the field of developmental biology.

== Intra-phylum vs. inter-phylum phylotypic period ==
The phylotypic period is defined as a period of maximal similarity between species within a phylum, but a recent study compared the phylotypic period across different phyla to examine whether the same conserved periods during development have been maintained across deeper phylogenetic relationships. Levin et al. compared the developmental gene expression patterns among ten individuals from ten different animal phyla and found evidence for an inverse hourglass model of gene expression divergence among different phyla. This inverse hourglass model reflects the observation that gene expression was significantly more divergent among species at the mid-developmental transition, while gene expression was more conserved in early and late stages of development. While this intriguing pattern could have implications for the definition of a phylum, a follow-up paper argued that there are a few methodical issues that must be addressed to test the hypothesis that the timing of developmental constraints are different among phyla compared to within a phylum. First, the comparison of a single representative of ten different phyla could reflect differences between phyla as well as the deeper or shallower phylogenetic branches that fall between those ten individuals, so greater sampling within each phyla is necessary. Second, pairwise comparisons treat each of the ten species as independent observations, but some species are more closely related than others.
