= PZ Myers =

American biologist and activist (born 1957)

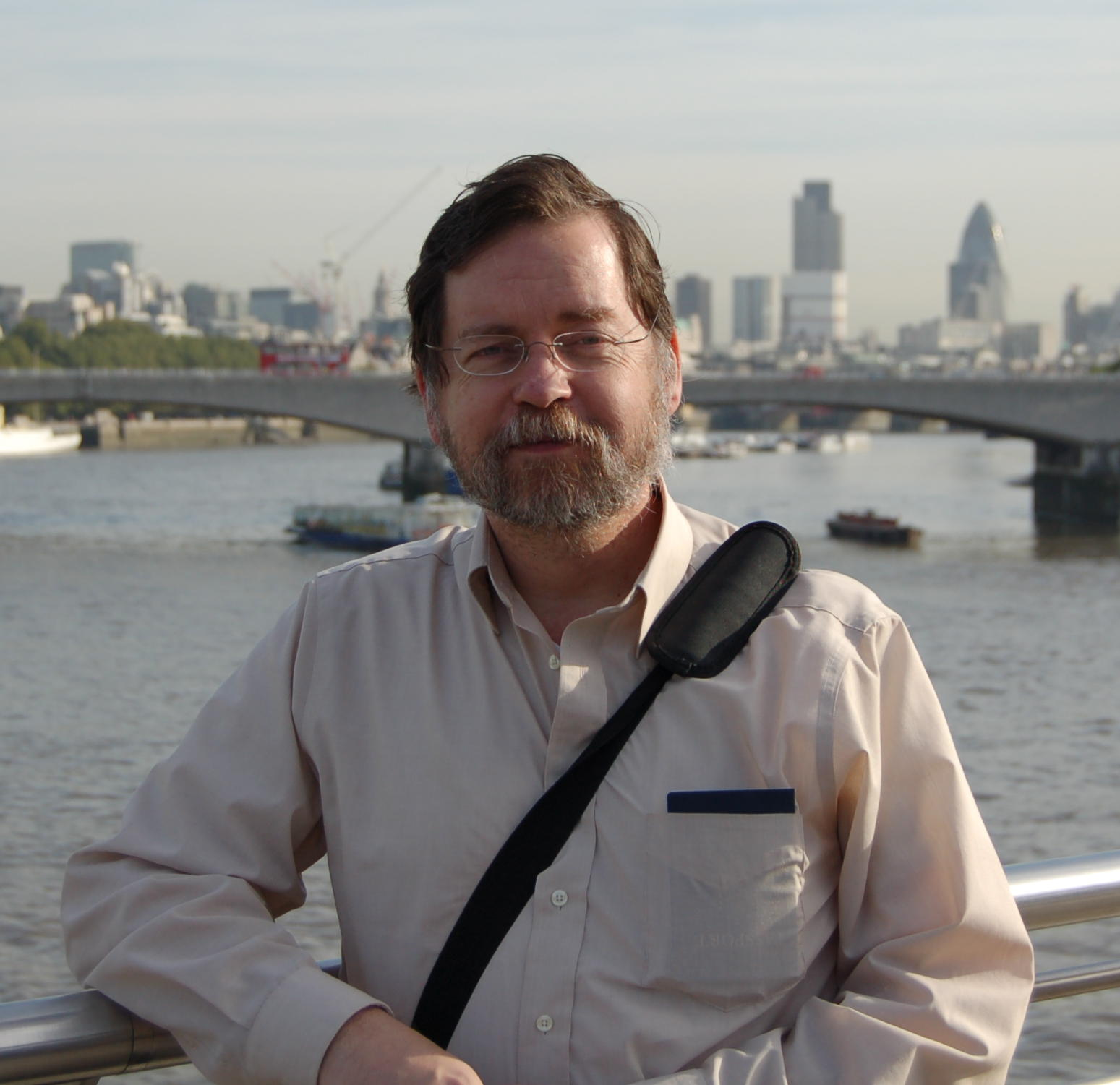
- PZ Myers in London in 2006
- Born: Paul Zachary Myers; March 9, 1957 (age 69); Kent, Washington, U.S.
- Education: University of Washington (BS); University of Oregon (PhD)
- Known for: Pharyngula blog
- Scientific career
- Fields: Evolutionary developmental biology
- Workplaces: University of Minnesota Morris

Paul Zachary Myers (born March 9, 1957) is an American biologist and activist who founded and writes the Pharyngula science and atheism blog. He is associate professor of biology at the University of Minnesota Morris (UMM) where he works in the field of developmental biology. He is a critic of intelligent design, the creationist movement, and pseudoscience.

In 2006 the journal Nature listed Myers's Pharyngula as the top-ranked blog by a scientist based on popularity. Myers received the American Humanist Association's 2009 Humanist of the Year award and the International Humanist Award in 2011. The asteroid 153298 Paulmyers is named in his honor.

== Early life and education ==
Paul Zachary Myers was born March 9, 1957, in Kent, Washington. He said that he has been a "science geek" from an early age, gaining an interest in zoology and marine biology.

Growing up, Myers attended an Evangelical Lutheran Church in America (ELCA) church. Prior to his confirmation, Myers says, "I started thinking, you know, I don't believe a word of this." Now an atheist, Myers comments on his blog about science, education, atheism and religion.

Myers graduated from Kent-Meridian High School in 1975 and subsequently attended DePauw University in Indiana on a full scholarship. However, he returned home the next year after his father suffered a heart attack. He then graduated from the University of Washington in 1979 with Bachelor of Science in zoology. Myers drifted away from this field toward evolutionary developmental biology and obtained a PhD in biology from the University of Oregon.

== Career ==
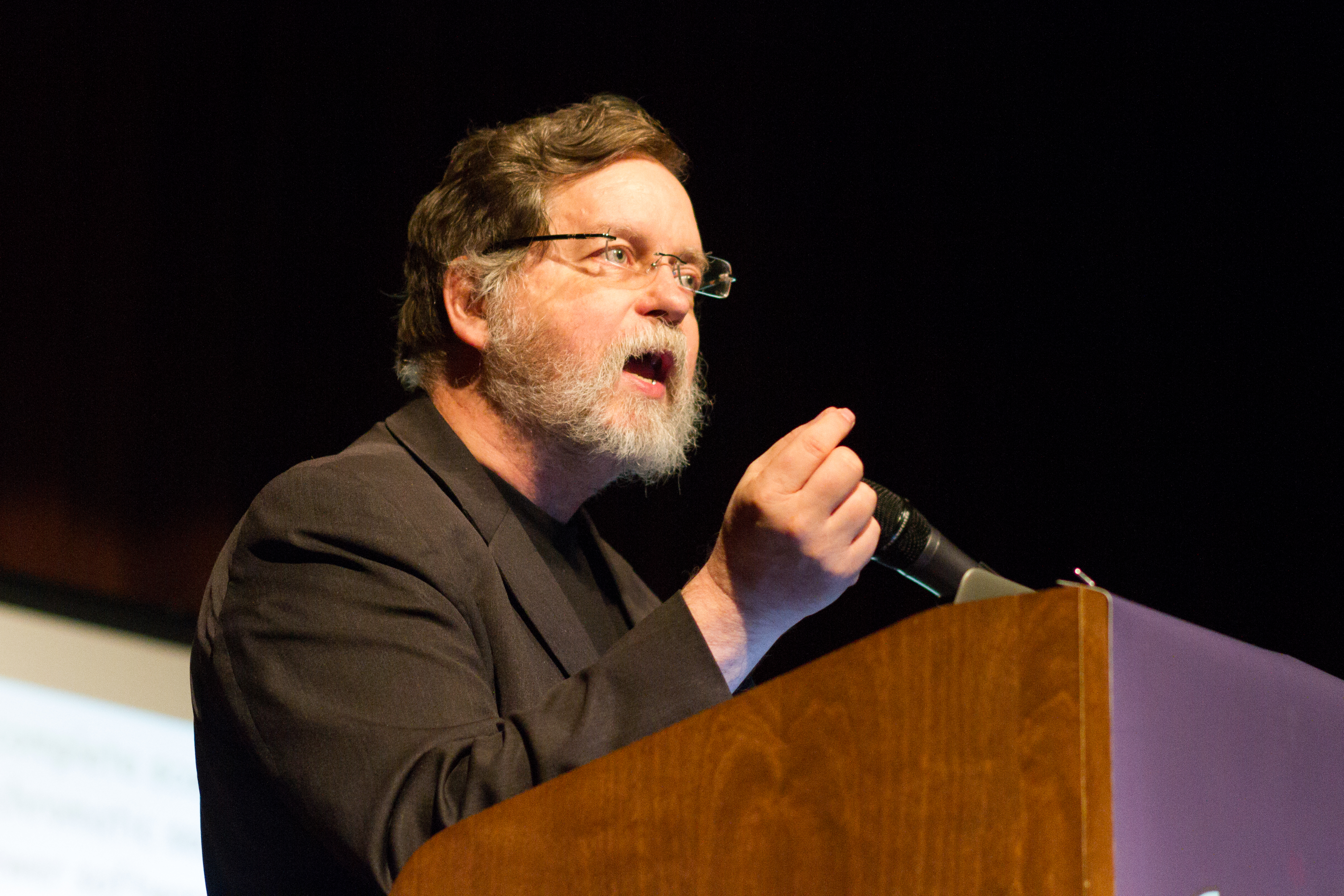
PZ Myers presents his talk, "You, too, can know more molecular genetics than a creationist!", at Skepticon in 2014.

Myers has taught and researched at the University of Oregon, the University of Utah, and Temple University. He is currently an associate professor of biology at the University of Minnesota's Morris campus, where he teaches developmental biology. He is a member of Minnesota Citizens for Science Education, and cultivates an interest in cephalopods.

Myers has been active on the internet. He was involved in scientific debates on USENET surrounding the growing creationist movement. He was a founding member of The Panda's Thumb blog. In June 2002, he started his website Pharyngula.org, which morphed into a blog now hosted by ScienceBlogs and Freethought Blogs. In 2006 the journal Nature listed Myers's Pharyngula as the top-ranked blog by a scientist based on popularity. In 2008, an asteroid was named after him, 153298 Paulmyers, in honor of this work.

A self-styled "godless liberal" and outspoken atheist, he is a vocal critic of all forms of religion, superstition, supernaturalism, spirituality and pseudoscience. He is quoted as having "nothing but contempt" for intelligent design, arguing that it is "fundamentally dishonest". In 2009 Myers was named the American Humanist Association's "Humanist of the Year".

Myers's book, The Happy Atheist, was published by Random House in August 2013. It is largely a compilation of previous blog posts. Voice for its audiobook version was provided by noted atheist and science communicator Aron Ra. Fellow blogger Greg Laden celebrates "the level of refinement of his writing" and writes that "these essays actually have a different feel to them".

In April 2015, Atheist Ireland issued an official announcement, apologizing that they had given Myers public platforms to speak and that now it is "publicly dissociating itself from the hurtful and dehumanising, hateful and violent, unjust and defamatory rhetoric of the atheist blogger PZ Myers... We believe his behaviour is unjust to individuals, increases prejudice against atheists, and is harmful to the promotion of an ethical society based on empathy, fairness, justice and integrity.".

In 2017, Myers, who formerly considered himself one of the "New Atheists", disassociated himself from the New Atheist label. Describing the label as being applied "against our protests, because we were all aware that there was nothing new about it. Maybe we were more aggressive, or maybe suddenly people were listening to us, but really, it was the same old atheism with a fancy artisan label". Myers prefers to be simply referred to as an atheist.

== Pharyngula ==
Pharyngula is Myers's personal weblog, promoted as "Evolution, development, and random biological ejaculations from a godless liberal." The topics Myers covers are eclectic, delving into the non-scientific as well as scientific. While Pharyngula includes many articles discussing breaking science news and research, the blog has become particularly well known for ridicule of intelligent design and of attempts to insert it into science education. In 2006, the science journal Nature listed Pharyngula as the top-ranked blog written by a scientist.

Myers started Pharyngula.org on June 19, 2002 as an experiment in writing instruction for a class. Students were required to submit mini-essays to be published online. After the project was finished, Myers still had the web-publishing software, and started to use it himself. The blog is named after his favorite stage in embryonic development, the pharyngula stage. Pharyngula moved to hosting at ScienceBlogs, a project of Seed Magazine, in 2005.

It was hosted on ScienceBlogs (2005–2011, in full, and 2011–present, in part) and on FreeThoughtBlogs (2011–present). In 2006, the science journal Nature listed it as the top-ranked blog written by a scientist based on popularity.

=== History ===
According to Alexa Internet, Pharyngula.org was started on June 19, 2002 as an experiment in writing instruction for a class. Students were required to submit miniessays to be published online. After the project was finished, Myers still had the webpublishing software, and started to use it personally. The blog is named after his favorite stage in embryonic development, the pharyngula stage. Pharyngula moved to hosting at ScienceBlogs in 2005.

In 2007, Myers reviewed Stuart Pivar's book Lifecode, which argues that self-organization at the embryonic and fetal stages determines the development and final structure of organisms. Myers reviewed the book negatively, stating that the diagrams and ideas in the book arose from Pivar's imagination and had no basis in actual evidence. After some discussion in the comments threads of Pharyngula, Pivar sued Myers for libel. Within a week Pivar withdrew the lawsuit, stating that "the real issue got sidelined" and that his problem was more with Seed Media Group.

In August 2011, Myers and others founded a new blog network, FreethoughtBlogs, to host Pharyngula and other blogs in the atheist/secular field. According to Myers, the move was made as an "acceptable compromise" between him and National Geographic, who at that time would be "taking a more active role in hosting the ScienceBlogs stable" and therefore "bringing their standards & practices, which are different from the more freewheeling policies of Seed Media [and would cause] a culture clash". Myers stated that "NatGeo and I have worked out an acceptable compromise. This site on Freethoughtblogs [...is not] in any way associated with National Geographic" and that he would only cross-post to his original site on ScienceBlogs "whatever I write that I feel is compatible with the more conservative ethos of National Geographic." As such, since August 2011, the complete Pharyngula has appeared on FreethoughtBlogs, and a limited selection of those posts – the more science-focused ones – are cross-posted to the ScienceBlogs-hosted version.

In September 2012, Myers announced that blogger and environmentalist Chris Clarke would become Pharyngula's co-author. Clarke left the blog in August 2013, partly because of the perceived unpleasantness of Pharyngula commenters

=== Content ===
Myers often criticizes intelligent design, creationism and pseudoscientific movements, and posts on subjects such as science, religion, politics, superstition, and education. His experience in evolutionary developmental biology and as a teacher provides depth to the subjects of science and education. One theme that arises regularly is that of cephalopods, creatures that Myers finds quite fascinating.

In particular Myers frequently offers specific criticisms of creationism, including intelligent design as well as the Discovery Institute, Answers in Genesis, and other groups that promote pseudoscientific ideas. For example, in February and March 2007, he focused many of his posts on creationist neurosurgeon Michael Egnor, who had recently joined the Discovery Institute. In addition to Myers's criticisms of Egnor's arguments on evolution and Intelligent Design, Myers criticized the Discovery Institute's reliance on someone whose expertise wasn't relevant to evolution.

In early April 2007, Myers participated in an April Fool's Day joke arranged by The Panda's Thumb which manufactured a website spoofing the Discovery Institute's page on which "Egnor" admitted that his association with the Discovery Institute was itself an April Fool's joke. This elaborate prank succeeded in fooling many of his readers, while others succeeded in spotting jokes in the design of the false Discovery Institute page and concluded that this admission was itself the prank. He made a point the following day that he perceived it as getting exceedingly difficult to believe some creationists were for real (cf. Poe's Law) and highlighted a quote by Stephen Meyer.

=== Memes ===
Myers has voiced the position that many of the responses to Richard Dawkins's The God Delusion are what he calls "Courtier's Replies". Replying to critics who felt that Dawkins ignored sophisticated versions of modern theology, Myers compared them to courtiers fawning on the legendary emperor who had no clothes:

I have considered the impudent accusations of Mr Dawkins with exasperation at his lack of serious scholarship. He has apparently not read the detailed discourses of Count Roderigo of Seville on the exquisite and exotic leathers of the Emperor's boots, nor does he give a moment's consideration to Bellini's masterwork, On the Luminescence of the Emperor's Feathered Hat. We have entire schools dedicated to writing learned treatises on the beauty of the Emperor's raiment, and every major newspaper runs a section dedicated to imperial fashion; Dawkins cavalierly dismisses them all. (...) Dawkins arrogantly ignores all these deep philosophical ponderings to crudely accuse the Emperor of nudity.

In other words, critics complain about Dawkins not studying aspects of theology that are irrelevant to whether or not God exists in the same way as scholarly writings about imperial fashion are irrelevant when the emperor is naked. Dawkins himself quoted the Courtier's Reply in a debate with Alister McGrath. He also referenced the Courtier's Reply in the preface to The God Delusion's 2007 paperback edition.

Another recurring trope has been Myers's reaction to the label "fundamentalist atheist", bestowed by some upon him, Dawkins and others who espouse similar views. Myers summarizes his stance by invoking "Blake's Law", named for Pharyngula commentator Blake Stacey. As formulated by Stacey in 2007, based in concept on Godwin's Law: "In any discussion of atheism (skepticism, etc.), the probability that someone will compare a vocal atheist to religious fundamentalists increases to one." He writes,

The "new atheism" (I don't like that phrase, either) is about taking a core set of principles that have proven themselves powerful and useful in the scientific world — you've probably noticed that many of these uppity atheists are coming out of a scientific background — and insisting that they also apply to everything else people do. These principles are a reliance on natural causes and demanding explanations in terms of the real world, with a documentary chain of evidence, that anyone can examine. The virtues are critical thinking, flexibility, openness, verification, and evidence. The sins are dogma, faith, tradition, revelation, superstition, and the supernatural. There is no holy writ, and a central idea is that everything must be open to rational, evidence-based criticism — it's the opposite of fundamentalism.

Myers has made frequent use of the phrase "deep rifts" to satirize perceptions that atheism could experience a religious schism over disagreements on marketing atheism or the role of science and religion. Myers does not deny there are some differences of opinion between prominent atheists, but contends this is a good thing and is attributed to the freethinking nature of atheism.

=== Eucharist incident ===
A controversy arose in July 2008 over a Pharyngula blog entry written by Myers expressing amazement at news reports of death threats issued to University of Central Florida Student Senator Webster Cook. On June 29, 2008, Cook attended a Catholic Mass being held in the student union at UCF by a Catholic student group that receives funding from the student government. Cook received the Catholic Eucharist host but did not consume it immediately. He said later that he wanted to take it back to his seat to show a friend, but when stopped he pretended to put it in his mouth until back at his seat, then a church leader made forcible attempts to take the wafer from him. Cook stored the host at his home, then returned it one week later after receiving e-mail threats and pleas. Bill Donohue, President of the Catholic League, described the student's actions as "beyond hate speech" and said that "All options should be on the table, including expulsion."

In his July 8 blog entry, he asked readers to acquire for him consecrated Eucharistic hosts, which he might "show you sacrilege, gladly, and with much fanfare" and could treat "with profound disrespect and heinous cracker abuse, all photographed and presented here on the web". Bill Donohue's Catholic League responded with a letter demanding the University of Minnesota and the Minnesota State Legislature take action against Myers. Proponents of this action noted that Myers's blog could be reached from his university web page. Myers has received several death threats and much hate mail over the controversy.

Myers criticized the reaction to Cook's act. Myers described the level of harassment including multiple death threats leveled against the student, and accusations against the student which included hate crime, kidnapping, and intent to desecrate the Eucharist which Catholics consider a mortal sin. Myers expressed outrage that Fox News Channel appeared to be inciting readers to cause further problems for the student, and ridiculed reports that armed guards would attend the next mass.

Myers was criticized from both religious and non-religious quarters. The Catholic League accused Myers of anti-Catholic bigotry, described his proposal as a threat to desecrate what Catholics hold to be the Body of Christ, and sent a letter asking the University of Minnesota and the Minnesota State Legislature to take action against Myers. The Catholic League argued that, as the Pharyngula website was accessible via a link from the University of Minnesota's website, it should be bound by the university's code of conduct, which requires faculty to be "respectful, fair and civil" when dealing with others. Joe Foley, a member of the Board of the Secular Student Alliance, wrote on the organization's website that Myers had "crossed the line" from "playful satire" to "masturbatory condescension". Foley concluded, "if open-minded believers are willing to join us in polite dialogue, we need to be ready to welcome them with more than ridicule and pranks".

Subsequently, Myers explained to the Star Tribune that while his post was "satire and protest", he had received death threats regarding the incident but was not taking them too seriously. In a talk show featuring Myers on Catholic Radio International, hosted by Jeff Gardner, Myers confirmed that he had been sent an unspecified number of consecrated hosts and said that he intended to "subject them to heinous cracker abuse". When asked by Gardner to explain why he must do so, Myers said that Donohue of the Catholic League was insisting that he acknowledge the Body of Christ in the Eucharist. Gardner pointed out that Donohue had no authority to insist on such acknowledgment. The show host then asked Myers which individual possessing the Magisterial authority of the Catholic Church had insisted that he recognize the Body of Christ in the Eucharist. Myers replied that no one from the Catholic Church had contacted him.

On July 24, 2008, Myers, in his post, "The Great Desecration," wrote that he had pierced through the "goddamned cracker" with a rusty nail, which he also used to pierce a few ripped-out pages of the Qur'an (in English translation, not the original Arabic) and The God Delusion, and had simply thrown them all in the trash along with old coffee grounds and a banana peel. He provided a photograph of these items in the garbage, and wrote that nothing must be held sacred, encouraging people to question everything. In addition, he described the history of allegations of host desecration, emphasizing the frequent use of such allegations in medieval Europe to justify anti-Semitism. The following day, University of Minnesota, Morris (UMM) Chancellor stated: "I believe that behaviors that discriminate against or harass individuals or groups on the basis of their religious beliefs are reprehensible" and that the school "affirms the freedom of a faculty member to speak or write as a public citizen without institutional discipline or restraint".

== Science activism ==
=== Interview and screening of Expelled ===
In April 2007 Myers was interviewed for what he was told would be a documentary titled Crossroads, purportedly about science and religion. However, in September 2007, executive producer Mark Mathis announced that the film was Expelled: No Intelligence Allowed about perceived censorship of intelligent design supporters in academia and elsewhere. Regarding the discrepancy of focus, Myers wrote: "I mean, seriously, not telling one of the sides in a debate about what the subject might be and then leading him around randomly to various topics, with the intent of later editing it down to the parts that just make the points you want, is the video version of quote-mining and is fundamentally dishonest."

On March 20, 2008, Myers was denied entry into a screening of Expelled: No Intelligence Allowed at the Mall of America in Minneapolis. He was waiting with his family and guests to attend a private screening after having reserved seats for himself and guests under his own name using the freely available online procedure set up by the film's promoters. Shortly before the film started, a security guard told him that the producer Mark Mathis had instructed that Myers be removed from the premises. After telling his family of this Myers went to a nearby Apple store and blogged about his amusement that they had expelled him, but allowed his guest entry to see the film—British evolutionary biologist Richard Dawkins, who had also been interviewed for the film under similar circumstances. In a question and answer session at the end of the film Dawkins asked why Myers had been excluded, and later said that "if anyone had a right to see the film, it was [Myers]. The incompetence, on a public relations level, is beyond belief." The saga has been described by Dawkins as "an incredible piece of inept public relations" on the part of the film's producers.

=== Creation Museum visit ===
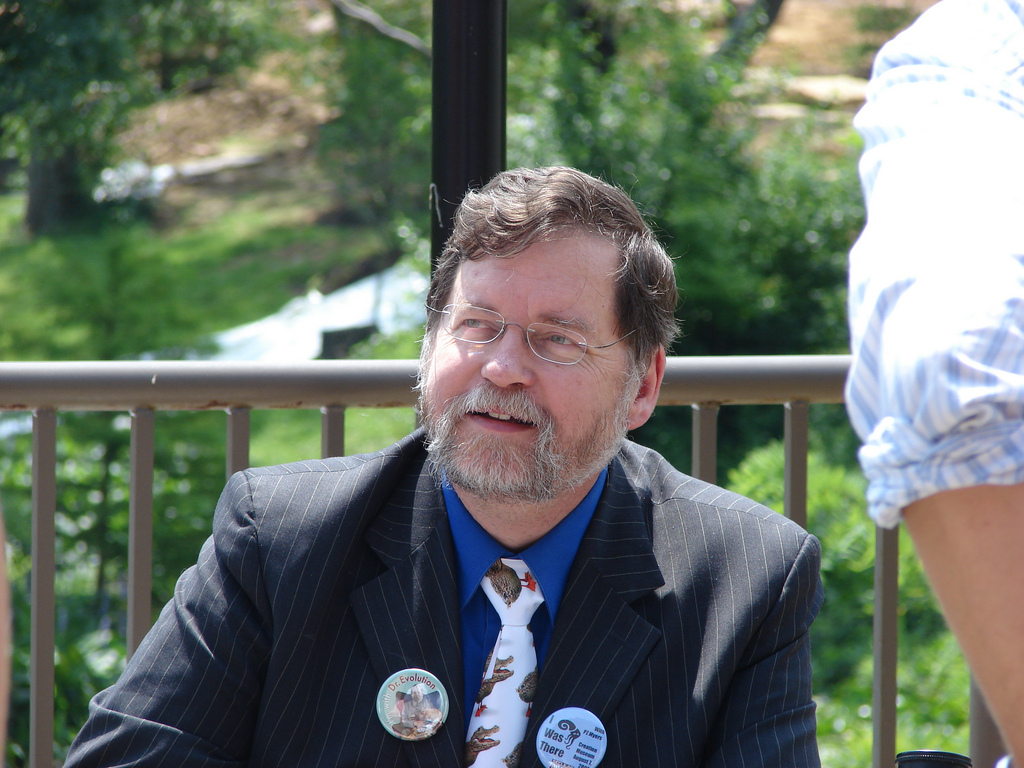
Myers at the Creation Museum

Myers's engagement as keynote speaker at the 2009 Secular Student Alliance Conference in Columbus, Ohio, developed into an August 7, 2009, trip, in which 304 attendees visited the nearby Creation Museum in Petersburg, Kentucky.

== Appearances ==
Myers has been invited to speak about science, rationalism, or atheism at conferences, symposia, and other events.

- Secular Student Alliance Conference in Columbus, Ohio, 2009
- Glasgow Skeptics in the Pub, 2011
- Global Atheist Convention in Melbourne, Australia, 2012
- Reason Rally, 24 March 2012

In July 2013, Freethought Blogs organized an online virtual conference called FtBCon or FtB Conscience. Google+ Hangout software was used to enable real-time discussion around the world. Participants included all the Freethought Blog bloggers as well as Jeremy Beahan, Jamila Bey, Virginia Brown, Ania Bula, David Brin, Eneasz Brodski, Ian Bushfield, environmental blogger and author Chris Clarke, James Croft, Heina Dadabhoy, J. T. Eberhard, Daniel Fincke, Debbie Goddard, Julia Galef, Nicole Harris, Rebecca Hensler, scientist and blogger Greg Laden, Robin Marty, science artist & blogger Glendon Mellow, Aoife O'Riordan, Beth Presswood of The Atheist Experience, Kim Rippere, Amy Roth, Jacques Rousseau, Desiree Schell of Skeptically Speaking, David Silverman, Xavier Trapp, blogger Rebecca Watson, Eliezer Yudkowsky, scientist & blogger Bora Zivkovic, and others. The conference was free and took place over three days.

== Awards ==
Myers has received several awards for his activism and blogging.

- International Humanist Award (2011)
- Humanist of the Year award (2009) American Humanist Association
- Top-ranked blog written by a scientist (Nature science journal, 2006)

== See also ==
- Antitheism
- Conflict thesis
- Creation–evolution controversy
- Popular science
- Scientific skepticism
