= Ethan Siegel =

American theoretical astrophysicist and science writer

Ethan R. Siegel
- Born: Bronx, New York City
- Education: Northwestern University (BA); University of Florida (PhD)
- Known for: Starts With a Bang! blog
- Scientific career
- Fields: Theoretical astrophysics and cosmology
- Workplaces: Lewis & Clark College
- Thesis: Cosmological perturbations and their effects on the universe
- Doctoral advisor: James N. Fry
- Website: https://www.forbes.com/sites/startswithabang/

Ethan R. Siegel is an American theoretical astrophysicist and science writer, who studies the Big Bang theory. In the past he has been a professor at Lewis & Clark College and a blogger at Starts With a Bang, on ScienceBlogs and also on Forbes.com since 2016.

== Early life and education ==
Siegel was born to "a Jewish postal worker" and grew up in the Bronx, where he attended Bronx High School of Science until 1996. Siegel graduated from Northwestern University with a B.A. degree in physics, classics and integrated science in 2000, and went on to earn his Ph.D. degree in astrophysics from the University of Florida in 2006.

== Career ==
Siegel worked at Fermilab in 1997. He received his undergraduate degree in physics, classics and integrated science from Northwestern University in June 2000. He was unsure whether to continue studying and took the GRE Physics Test "just in case". He taught in high school in Houston and at King Drew Magnet High School of Medicine and Science in inner-city Los Angeles for a year and though he "liked some aspects" of teaching he then decided he did not want to teach any longer, had a crisis and, influenced by Carl Sagan's Cosmos, he went back into academia to study the universe.

He studied theoretical cosmology, in particular cosmological perturbation theory, at graduate school at the University of Florida with advisor Prof. Jim Fry from 2001. He received his PhD in 2006. During his graduate studies he was a teaching assistant and lecturer in physics, he sat on the graduate student affairs committee, and he was an assistant coordinator for REU students.

Siegel was a teaching assistant in undergraduate general physics at the University of Wisconsin in Spring 2007 and then took up a post-doctoral research post at the University of Arizona. In 2008, Siegel moved with his then fiancée to Portland, Oregon, after deciding to not pursue an ambitious research career with long hours and instead focus on science outreach and have a "fuller, richer life". He taught at the University of Portland and then Lewis & Clark College, where he was a visiting assistant professor. He later became science and health editor for Trapit. He moved to Toledo, Washington, in late 2014, while continuing to occasionally teach at Lewis & Clark. He became a full-time self-employed science writer in May 2018.

=== Outreach ===
In December 2015 Siegel published his popular science book Beyond the Galaxy: How Humanity Looked Beyond Our Milky Way and Discovered the Entire Universe with World Scientific, which he said is for "people who are curious and intelligent but don’t have scientific backgrounds". In the book, Siegel critiques the MOND theory of gravity, arguing "its failure to meet the criteria of reproducing the successes of the already-established leading theory means that it has not yet risen to the status of scientifically viable." Greg Laden compared it to Isaac Asimov's "The Intelligent Man's Guide to the Physical Sciences", physicist Sabine Hossenfelder said it "is the missing link between cosmology textbooks and popular science articles", and PhD student Jonah Miller said it is "one of those rare books that not only communicates scientific ideas, but communicates what science itself is all about."

In 2012 and 2015, he was the Science Guest of Honor and toastmaster at MidSouthCon, where he promoted the joy of science. In April 2017, he was the Science Guest of Honor at Norwescon 40. Siegel wears costumes such as a wrestler or superhero to attract attention to his science communication.

==== Blog ====
"The Universe is out there, waiting for you to discover it."

— Starts With a Bang tagline

Siegel's blog Starts With a Bang started in January 2008 at startswithabang.com and then ScienceBlogs from March 2009 to October 2017. The blog included a monthly podcast and Siegel posts answers to questions from readers in the "Ask Ethan" series. He hosted guest bloggers, including Sabine Hossenfelder and Paul Halpern. Topics he covered include adaptive optics, using lasers in astronomy to adjust for atmospheric turbulence, the detection of gravitational waves from colliding black holes by LIGO, and why quantum entanglement does not allow faster-than-light communication. By January 2011, his blog had been viewed 2 million times.

Described as "beautifully illustrated and full of humour", his blog won the 2010 Physics.org award for best blog, judged by Adam Rutherford, Alom Shaha, Gia Milinovich, Hayley Birch, Lata Sahonta, and Stuart Clark and the people's choice award, and his post "Where Is Everybody?" came third in the 2011 3 Quarks Daily science writing awards, judged by Lisa Randall, winning a "Charm Quark" for "[taking] on the challenge of simplifying probability estimates without sacrificing the nature of the enterprise or suppressing the uncertainties involved". Siegel headed the RealClearScience list of top science bloggers in 2013, as his "unmatched ability to describe the nearly indecipherable made him an easy choice for #1." Siegel also wrote a column for NASA, The Space Place. He continues to contribute content on Forbes website.

=== Works ===
Siegel first published in physics in 2003, working mainly on dark matter and structure formation. Significant works include:

- Siegel, Ethan R. (2006). Cosmological perturbations and their effects on the universe (PDF). University of Florida.
- Seo, Hee-Jong; Siegel, Ethan R.; Eisenstein, Daniel J.; White, Martin (2008). "Nonlinear Structure Formation and the Acoustic Scale". The Astrophysical Journal. 686 (1): 13–24. arXiv:0805.0117. Bibcode:2008ApJ...686...13S. doi:10.1086/589921. S2CID 14105853.
- Siegel, Ethan (December 2015). Beyond the Galaxy: How Humanity Looked Beyond Our Milky Way and Discovered the Entire Universe. World Scientific. doi:10.1142/9547. ISBN 978-981-4667-23-4.
- Treknology: The Science of Star Trek from Tricorders to Warp Drive. Voyageur Press. October 15, 2017. ISBN 9780760352632.

Siegel also writes articles beyond astrophysics. For example, following the publication of Science article by prominent US and UK researchers advocating for further investigation of the Wuhan Institute of Virology, Siegel advocates that Covid-19 did not come from Chinese labs.

== Personal life ==
Siegel met his wife in Madison, Wisconsin. He has a large beard and moustache and wears a kilt; he entered the West Coast Beard and Mustache competition in Portland in 2011. He is "often asked why he doesn’t look like a scientist". Siegel is Jewish and has described himself as an atheist while simultaneously believing that "there likely was some organizing force or principle that somehow led to the existence of the state that eventually created the Universe as we know it today". He plays online chess and is a fan of My Little Pony.
