= Pharyngula =

The pharyngula is a stage in the embryonic development of vertebrates. At this stage, the embryos of all vertebrates are similar, having developed features typical of vertebrates, such as the beginning of a spinal cord. Named by William Ballard, the pharyngula stage follows the blastula, gastrula and neurula stages.

== Morphological similarity in vertebrate embryos ==
At the pharyngula stage, all vertebrate embryos show remarkable similarities, i.e., it is a "phylotypic stage" of the sub-phylum, containing the following features:

- notochord
- dorsal hollow nerve cord
- post-anal tail, and
- a series of paired branchial grooves.

The branchial grooves are matched on the inside by a series of paired gill pouches. In fish, the pouches and grooves eventually meet and form the gill slits, which allow water to pass from the pharynx over the gills and out the body.

In the other vertebrates, the grooves and pouches disappear. In humans, the chief trace of their existence is the eustachian tube and auditory canal which (interrupted only by the eardrum) connect the pharynx with the outside of the head.

The existence of a common pharyngula stage for vertebrates was first proposed by German biologist Ernst Haeckel (1834–1919) in 1874.

== The hourglass model ==
The observation of the conservation of animal morphology during the embryonic phylotypic period, where there is maximal similarity between the species within each animal phylum, has led to the proposition that embryogenesis diverges more extensively in the early and late stages than the middle stage, and is known as the hourglass model. Comparative genomic studies suggest that the phylotypic stage is the maximally conserved stage during embryogenesis.

== See also ==
- Evolutionary developmental biology
- Embryogenesis
- Embryo drawing
- Recapitulation theory
