= Palingenesis =

Concept of rebirth or re-creation

Palingenesis (/ˌpælɪnˈdʒɛnəsɪs/; also palingenesia from Greek: παλιγγενεσία) is a concept of rebirth or re-creation, used in various contexts in philosophy, theology, politics, and biology. Its meaning stems from Greek palin, meaning 'again', and genesis, meaning 'birth'.

In biology, it is another word for recapitulation – the largely discredited hypothesis that the development of an advanced individual organism mirrors the development of entire, more primitive species. In political theory, it is a central component of Roger Griffin's analysis of fascism as a fundamentally modernist ideology. In theology, the word may refer to reincarnation or to Christian spiritual rebirth.

== Philosophy and theology ==
The word palingenesis or rather palingenesia (Ancient Greek: παλιγγενεσία) may be traced back to the Stoics, who used the term for the continual re-creation of the universe. Similarly, Philo designated Noah and his sons as leaders of a renovation or rebirth of the earth, Plutarch spoke of the transmigration of souls, and Cicero focused on his own return from exile.

In the Gospel of Matthew (Matthew 19:28), Jesus is quoted in Greek (likely Aramaic in the original) using the word "παλιγγενεσία" (palingenesia) to describe the Last Judgment foreshadowing the event of the regeneration of a new world.

In philosophy, it denotes in its broadest sense the theory (of the Pythagoreans) that the human soul does not die with the body but is born again in new incarnations. It is thus the equivalent of metempsychosis. The term has a narrower and more specific use in the system of Arthur Schopenhauer, who applied it to his doctrine that the will does not die but manifests itself afresh in new individuals. He thus modified the original metempsychosis doctrine which maintains the reincarnation of the particular soul.

Robert Burton, in The Anatomy of Melancholy (1628), writes, "The Pythagoreans defend metempsychosis and palingenesia, that souls go from one body to another."

== Politics and history ==
In Antiquities of the Jews (11.3.9), Josephus used the term palingenesis for the return of Judeans to Judea after 70 years since the Babylonian exile. The term is commonly used in Modern Greek to refer to the restoriation of Greek sovereignty after the Greek Revolution since the fall of Constantinople in 1453. Thomas Carlyle used it in Sartor Resartus (1833–34), referring to the "Newbirth of Society", a stage in Carlyle's cyclical view of history as the "burning of a World-Phoenix".

The British political theorist Roger Griffin has coined the term palingenetic ultranationalism as a core tenet of fascism, stressing the notion of fascism as an ideology of rebirth of a state or empire in the image of that which came before it – its ancestral political underpinnings. Examples of this are Fascist Italy and Nazi Germany. Under Benito Mussolini, Italy purported to establish an empire as the second incarnation of the Roman Empire, while Adolf Hitler's regime purported itself to be the third palingenetic incarnation of the German "Reich" – beginning first with the Holy Roman Empire ("First Reich"), followed by Bismarck's German Empire ("Second Reich") and then Nazi Germany ("Third Reich").

Moreover, Griffin's work on palingenesis in fascism analysed the pre-war fin de siècle Western society. In doing so he built on Frank Kermode's work The Sense of an Ending which sought to understand the belief in the death of society at the end of the century.

Chilean dictator Augusto Pinochet expressed his post-coup project in government as a national rebirth inspired in Diego Portales, a figure of the early republic:

...[democracy] will be born again purified from the vices and bad habits that ended up destroying our institutions ... we are inspired in the Portalian spirit which has fused together the nation ...

== Science ==
In modern biology (e.g., Ernst Haeckel and Fritz Müller), palingenesis has been used for the exact reproduction of ancestral features by inheritance, as opposed to kenogenesis, in which the inherited characteristics are modified by environment.

It was also applied to the quite different process supposed by Karl Beurlen to be the mechanism for his orthogenetic theory of evolution.

== See also ==
- Eternal return
- Palingenetic ultranationalism
- Translatio imperii
