= Courtier's reply =

Fallacy that the critic lacks knowledge

The courtier's reply is a type of informal fallacy, coined by American biologist PZ Myers, in which a respondent to criticism claims that the critic lacks sufficient knowledge, credentials, or training to pose any sort of criticism whatsoever. It may be considered an inverted form of argument from authority, where a person without authority disagreeing with authority is presumed incorrect prima facie.

A key element of a courtier's reply, which distinguishes it from an otherwise valid response that incidentally points out the critic's lack of established authority on the topic, is that the respondent never shows how the work of these overlooked experts invalidates the arguments that were advanced by the critic.

Critics of the idea that the courtier's reply is a real fallacy have called it the "Myers shuffle", implying calling someone out for an alleged courtier's reply is a kind of rhetorical dodge or trick.

== Usage history ==
American biologist and academic PZ Myers coined the term "courtier's reply" in a December 2006 entry on his blog, Pharyngula. Myers was reacting to some of the criticism leveled at the 2006 book The God Delusion, in which author Richard Dawkins argued against the existence of a supernatural creator. Critics argued that Dawkins' lack of qualifications in philosophy or theology called into question a number of his arguments. Myers responded to this criticism by making an analogy, comparing Dawkins to the boy at the end of the fable The Emperor's New Clothes, who is the only reasonable voice that recognizes the Emperor is naked. Myers satirized the aforementioned critics as follows:

I have considered the impudent accusations of Mr Dawkins with exasperation at his lack of serious scholarship. He has apparently not read the detailed discourses of Count Roderigo of Seville on the exquisite and exotic leathers of the Emperor's boots, nor does he give a moment's consideration to Bellini's masterwork, On the Luminescence of the Emperor's Feathered Hat. We have entire schools dedicated to writing learned treatises on the beauty of the Emperor's raiment, and every major newspaper runs a section dedicated to imperial fashion; Dawkins cavalierly dismisses them all. He even laughs at the highly popular and most persuasive arguments of his fellow countryman, Lord D. T. Mawkscribbler, who famously pointed out that the Emperor would not wear common cotton, nor uncomfortable polyester, but must, I say must wear undergarments of the finest silk. Dawkins arrogantly ignores all these deep philosophical ponderings to crudely accuse the Emperor of nudity.

Myers also characterized H. Allen Orr's criticism of The God Delusion as an example of this argument.

Dawkins himself responded to critics of The God Delusion who argued that he is not a theologian and stated, "Most of us happily disavow fairies, astrology, and the Flying Spaghetti Monster without first immersing ourselves in books of Pastafarian theology." Dawkins quoted the courtier's reply in a debate with Alister McGrath, and he also referenced it in the preface to The God Delusion's 2007 paperback edition.

English literary theorist and critic Terry Eagleton wrote of The God Delusion: "What, one wonders, are Dawkins's views on the epistemological differences between Aquinas and Duns Scotus? Has he read Eriugena on subjectivity, Rahner on grace or Moltmann on hope? Has he even heard of them? Or does he imagine like a bumptious young barrister that you can defeat the opposition while being complacently ignorant of its toughest case?" Luke Muehlhauser, the executive director of the Machine Intelligence Research Institute, wrote on his blog, Common Sense Atheism, that this criticism is irrelevant when the existence or otherwise of God is discussed. Muehlhauser wrote, "Eagleton misses the point. If a creator god doesn't exist, it doesn't matter whether the imaginary god's grace is best described by Rahner or someone else. Besides, the millions of believers to which Dawkins writes have never heard of Rahner, either. Christianity as practiced by billions of people is not the Christianity of the academic theologians."

== Criticism ==
Roman Catholic philosopher Edward Feser, writing in The American, has called the courtier's reply a rhetorical "pseudo-defense" employed as a "clever marketing tag" in order for members of the New Atheism movement to avoid criticism of their arguments. Feser terms the courtier's reply "the Myers shuffle".

The "Myers shuffle" criticism claims that invoking the courtier's reply rhetoric usually acts as a summation of sophistry and/or logical fallacies. It particularly characterizes Muehlhauser's form of the assertion (that philosophical or theological ignorance is irrelevant if the existence of God is not established), as a case of fallacious special pleading, and points out that asserting that the "average believer" is not well informed about theology is a red herring since the popularity of a position does not make it true, a fallacy known as argumentum ad populum. In turn, Muehlhauser and others reply that Feser is engaging in special pleading and privileging the hypothesis.
