= Phylotype =

Observed similarity used to classify organisms

In taxonomy, a phylotype is an observed similarity used to classify a group of organisms by their phenetic relationship. This phenetic similarity, particularly in the case of asexual organisms, may reflect the evolutionary relationships. The term is rank-neutral, so that phylotypes can be described at different levels, such as species, class, 97% genetic similarity, or homology. The term is often used in microbiology, since the genomes of prokaryotes, which freely exchange genetic material, do not lend themselves to classification via Linnean taxonomy as easily as do many eukaryotes such as plants and animals.

== See also ==
- Phenotype – Composite of the organism's observable characteristics or traits
- Phylotypic stage
