= Seed (magazine) =

Online science magazine

- August 2007 (vol. 11)
- Editor-in-chief: Adam Bly
- Categories: Science magazine
- Frequency: Bimonthly
- First issue: November 2001 (vol. 1); October/November 2005 (vol. 2)
- Final issue Number: May/June 2009; 22
- Company: Seed Media Group
- Country: United States
- Language: English
- Website: SeedMagazine.com
- ISSN: 1499-0679

Seed (subtitled Science Is Culture; originally Beneath the Surface) is a defunct online science magazine published by Seed Media Group. The magazine looked at big ideas in science, important issues at the intersection of science and society, and the people driving global science culture. Seed was founded in Montreal by Adam Bly and the magazine was then headquartered in New York with bureaus around the world. May/June 2009 (Issue No. 22) was the last print issue. Content continued to be published on the website until its demise in 2012.

Seed was a finalist for two National Magazine Awards in 2007 in the categories of Design and General Excellence (100,000 to 250,000), was the recipient of the Utne Independent Press Award, and was included in the 2006 Best American Science and Nature Writing anthology published by Houghton Mifflin and edited by Brian Greene.

The magazine published original writing from scientists and science journalists. Scientists who contributed to the magazine include: James D. Watson, Freeman Dyson, Lisa Randall, Martin Rees, Steven Pinker, E.O. Wilson, and Daniel Dennett. Seed's design direction was created by Stefan Sagmeister. Jonah Lehrer also contributed features to Seed.

Jeffrey Epstein and his associate Ghislaine Maxwell were board members of Seed Media Group when Stuart Pivar sued it and its ScienceBlogs contributor P.Z. Myers in 2007 for defamation.

== History ==
Bly's first incursion into media came in 2000, when he launched an online magazine, the Journal of Young Scientists (www.joysnet.com). He was previously a researcher at Canada's National Research Council. JoYS shared Seed's focus on the roles of science in many aspects of society, as well as its emphasis on design. Nobel laureate Leon M. Lederman was among the senior scientists who contributed to the magazine.

Founding the media group SEED Group, based in Montreal and funded privately, Bly started Seed's publication in Canada in November 2001. The magazine focused on the meeting of science and culture at its inception: Bly's first editor's note declared that "SEED defines the science of contemporary urban culture". In additional interviews, he explained that the magazine would connect to the reader by showing the widespread applications of science, as well as giving faces to "the people behind science" by placing people on the covers. The first issue had a circulation of 105,000 within the U.S. and Canada; popular science writer Matt Ridley was among the contributors.

Seed described its design as "science couture", with many pages where graphics dominated text. The first cover featured a nude male-female couple and included pieces themed around birth. The Boston Globe described two interior pages in which "Above a pacifier image is an essay on fluids and engineering with curves. A purple balloon floats above a few sentences about the expanding universe." High fashion also permeated the magazine's advertising, which included "Hugo Boss, Kahlúa [sic], Evian, Club Monaco, Absolut Citron, Kenzo, [and] Skechers" in the first issue; The Christian Science Monitor described the juxtaposition of the graphic design as "often making it difficult to tell where the journalism ends and the sales pitches begin".

The first issue received coverage in both Science and Nature.

The final issue was published in February 2012, with no issues between May 2011 and February 2012.

== Features ==
The magazine was laid out in sections, each separated by a portfolio of science photography:

- Notebook – front section containing a mix of news, op-art, opinions, interviews and articles, and columns by Chris Mooney (Politics), PZ Myers (Pharyngula) and Mara Hvistendahl (Asia).
- Incubator – summary of innovative scientific ideas. This section also contained each month's Cribsheet; "SEED's tear-outable tool for living in the 21st Century", a series of small posters each summarizing a scientific field, printed on heavy card stock. The series was also available for free download on SEED's website in GIF and PDF formats.
- Features – included profiles, essays, photoessays, investigations and fiction. This section also contained the regular feature Seed Salon, which transcribed a conversation between a scientist and an artist or humanist.
- Reviews – a guide to global science culture; included reviews and critiques of books, exhibits, plays, films, museums and art
- Laboratory – the back page captured science conducted in unexpected places.
