= Caenogenesis =

Biological concept

Caenogenesis (also spelled cenogenesis, kainogenesis, kenogenesis) is the introduction of new structures (due to adaptation) during embryonic development not present in the earlier evolutionary history of the strain or species that do not remain in the adult form, as opposed to palingenesis. It encapsulates both theories of heterochrony and heterotopy. Caenogenesis is a violation to Ernst Haeckel's biogenetic law (the idea that the embryo development of an organism represents its evolutionary history in adult form). Though it is now an outdated principle, it was a driver in refuting biogenetic law. In the 1900s, it began to be used to characterize adult animals that look similar but develop differently.

== Haeckel's examples ==
Haeckel grouped embryonic features into two categories: palingenetic and cenogenetic. Palingenetic encapsulated any structure that aligned with his biogenetic law, meaning that the structure had existed in the adult form of a previous ancestor. Any other characteristic was treated as an exception to biogenetic law and labeled as cenogenetic.

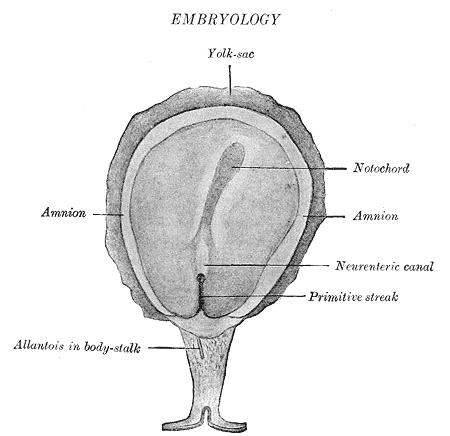
A diagram of an embryo of a black crested gibbon embryo. It illustrates a small yolk, something that Haeckel termed cenogenetic because it was not a structure represented in adult form, or present in organisms that evolved before reptiles.

Haeckel determined that the development of the yolk and chorion in birds and reptiles was a cenogenetic development, as they did not represent any adult ancestor that these organisms could be related to. Additionally, evolutionarily older organisms did not possess these structures, leading him to believe that they were adaptation, and should be grouped as cenogenetic.

Similarly, Haeckel determined that the placenta was a cenogenetic trait. He could find no ancestor of mammals that looked like this structure in adult form.

== Historical relevance ==
While Haeckel originally intended for the theory to focus on embryogenesis, its principles have been applied to larval adaptations as well. To do this, the definition gradually began to change over time. By the 1950s, the term was being used to describe adult organisms that look similar but develop differently, which helped to create a new way to identify species using developmental characteristics.

In 1962, David Clark drew a cenogentic connection between two types of turrilitids (extinct cephalopods). The formation of their shells varies greatly between the two examined (Wintonia graysonensis and Plesioturrilites bosquensis), with one consistently forming a spiral throughout development, and the other forming a straight shaft initially and a spiral form later in development. It was determined that these were two subspecies, rather than the same species, based on their differences in development.

In 1992, scientists compared the development of marbeled newts and axolotls. Despite their similaraties in adult forms, they found significant differences in their developmental stages. The marbeled newt’s digits were elongated, and the direction in which their axis developed was the opposite of the axolotl. This showed that speciation should also be determined by examining development, not just adult forms.

Ultimately, caenogenesis lead to the refutal of biogenetic law, which paved the way for other theories to take its place, including evolutionary developmental biology, which has become a heavily researched field.

== See also ==
- Ontogeny
- Recapitulation theory
