= History of zoology (1859–present) =

This article considers the history of zoology since the theory of evolution by natural selection proposed by Charles Darwin in 1859.

Charles Darwin gave new direction to morphology and physiology, by uniting them in a common biological theory: the theory of organic evolution. The result was a reconstruction of the classification of animals upon a genealogical basis, fresh investigation of the development of animals, and early attempts to determine their genetic relationships. The end of the 19th century saw the fall of spontaneous generation and the rise of the germ theory of disease, though the mechanism of inheritance remained a mystery. In the early 20th century, the rediscovery of Mendel's work led to the rapid development of genetics by Thomas Hunt Morgan and his students, and by the 1930s the combination of population genetics and natural selection in the "neo-Darwinian synthesis".

== Second half of nineteenth century ==
=== Darwin and the theory of evolution ===
The 1859 publication of Darwin's theory in On the Origin of Species by Means of Natural Selection, or the Preservation of Favoured Races in the Struggle for Life is often considered the central event in the history of modern zoology. Darwin's established credibility as a naturalist, the sober tone of the work, and most of all the sheer strength and volume of evidence presented, allowed Origin to succeed where previous evolutionary works such as the anonymous Vestiges of Creation had failed. Most scientists were convinced of evolution and common descent by the end of the 19th century. However, natural selection would not be accepted as the primary mechanism of evolution until well into the 20th century, as most contemporary theories of heredity seemed incompatible with the inheritance of random variation.

Alfred Russel Wallace, following on earlier work by de Candolle, Humboldt and Darwin, made major contributions to zoogeography. Because of his interest in the transmutation hypothesis, he paid particular attention to the geographical distribution of closely allied species during his field work first in South America and then in the Malay Archipelago. While in the archipelago he identified the Wallace line, which runs through the Spice Islands dividing the fauna of the archipelago between an Asian zone and a New Guinea/Australian zone. His key question, as to why the fauna of islands with such similar climates should be so different, could only be answered by considering their origin. In 1876 he wrote The Geographical Distribution of Animals, which was the standard reference work for over half a century, and a sequel, Island Life, in 1880 that focused on island biogeography. He extended the six-zone system developed by Philip Sclater for describing the geographical distribution of birds to animals of all kinds. His method of tabulating data on animal groups in geographic zones highlighted the discontinuities; and his appreciation of evolution allowed him to propose rational explanations, which had not been done before.

The scientific study of heredity grew rapidly in the wake of Darwin's Origin of Species with the work of Francis Galton and the biometricians. The origin of genetics is usually traced to the 1866 work of the monk Gregor Mendel, who would later be credited with the laws of inheritance. However, his work was not recognized as significant until 35 years afterward. In the meantime, a variety of theories of inheritance (based on pangenesis, orthogenesis, or other mechanisms) were debated and investigated vigorously.

In 1859, Charles Darwin placed the whole theory of organic evolution on a new footing. Darwin's discovery documented a process by which organic evolution can occur, and provided observational evidence that it had done so. This changed the attitudes of most exponents of the scientific method. Darwin's discoveries revolutionised the zoological and botanical sciences, by introducing the theory of evolution by natural selection as an explanation for the diversity of all animal and plant life. The subject-matter of this new science, or branch of biological science, had been neglected: it did not form part of the studies of the collector and systematist, nor was it a branch of anatomy, nor of the physiology pursued by medical men, nor again was it included in the field of microscopy and the cell theory. Almost a thousand years before Darwin, the Arab scholar Al-Jahiz (781–868) had already developed a rudimentary theory of natural selection, describing the Struggle for existence in his Book of Animals where he speculates on how environmental factors can affect the characteristics of species by forcing them to adapt and then passing on those new traits to future generations. However, his work had largely been forgotten, along with many other early advances of Arab scientists, and there is no evidence that his works were known to Darwin.

The area of biological knowledge which Darwin was the first to subject to scientific method and to render, as it were, contributory to the great stream formed by the union of the various branches, is that which relates to the breeding of animals and plants, their congenital variations, and the transmission and perpetuation of those variations. Outside the scientific world, an immense mass of observation and experiment had grown up in relation to this subject. From the earliest times, people involved in Animal husbandry and plant breeding had made use of biological laws in a simple way. Darwin made use of these observations and formulated their results as the laws of variation and heredity. As the breeder selects a congenital variation which suits his requirements, and by breeding from the animals (or plants) exhibiting that variation obtains a new breed specially characterised by that variation, so in nature is there a selection amongst all the congenital variations of each generation of a species. This selection depends on the fact that more young are born than the natural provision of food will support. In consequence of this excess of births there is a struggle for existence and a survival of the fittest, and consequently an ever-present necessarily acting selection, which either maintains accurately the form of the species from generation to generation or leads to its modification in correspondence with changes in the surrounding circumstances which have relation to its fitness for success in the struggle for life, structures to the service of the organisms in which they occur.

Darwin's theory reformed the concept of teleology in biology. According to that theory, every organ, every part, colour and peculiarity of an organism, must either be of benefit to that organism itself or have been so to its ancestors: no peculiarity of structure or general conformation, no habit or instinct in any organism, can be supposed to exist for the benefit or amusement of another organism.

A very subtle and important qualification of this generalization was recognized by Darwin: owing to the interdependence of the parts of the bodies of living things and their profound chemical interactions and peculiar structural balance (what is called organic polarity) the variation of one single part (a spot of colour, a tooth, a claw, a leaflet) may entail variation of other parts. Hence many structures which are obvious to the eye, and serve as distinguishing marks of separate species, are really not themselves of value or use, but are the necessary concomitants of less obvious and even altogether obscure qualities, which are the real characters upon which selection is acting. Such correlated variations may attain to great size and complexity without being of use. But eventually they may in turn become, in changed conditions, of selective value. Thus in many cases the difficulty of supposing that selection has acted on minute and imperceptible initial variations, so small as to have no selective value, may be got rid of. A useless correlated variation may have attained great volume and quality before it is (as it were) seized upon and perfected by natural selection. All organisms are essentially and necessarily built up by such correlated variations.

Necessarily, according to the theory of natural selection, structures either are present because they are selected as useful or because they are still inherited from ancestors to whom they were useful, though no longer useful to the existing representatives of those ancestors. Structures previously inexplicable were now explained as survivals from a past age, no longer useful though once of value. Every variety of form and colour was urgently and absolutely called upon to produce its title to existence either as an active useful agent or as a survival. Darwin himself spent a large part of the later years of his life in thus extending the new teleology.

The old doctrine of types, which was used by the philosophically minded zoologists (and botanists) of the first half of the 19th century as a ready means of explaining the failures and difficulties of the doctrine of design, fell into its proper place under the new dispensation. The adherence to type, the favourite conception. of the transcendental morphologist, was seen to be nothing more than the expression of one of the laws of thremmatology, the persistence of hereditary transmission of ancestral characters, even when they have ceased to be significant or valuable in the struggle for existence, while the so-called evidences of design which was supposed to modify the limitations of types assigned to Himself by the Creator were seen to be adaptations due to the selection and intensification by selective breeding of fortuitous congenital variations, which happened to prove more useful than the many thousand other variations which did not survive in the struggle for existence.

Thus not only did Darwin's theory give a new basis to the study of organic structure, but, while rendering the general theory of organic evolution equally acceptable and necessary, it explained the existence of low and simple forms of life as survivals of the earliest ancestry of the more highly complex forms, and revealed the classifications of the systematist as unconscious attempts to construct the genealogical tree or pedigree of plants and animals. Finally, it brought the simplest living matter or formless protoplasm before the mental vision as the starting point whence, by the operation of necessary mechanical causes, the highest forms have been evolved, and it rendered unavoidable the conclusion that this earliest living material was itself evolved by gradual processes, the result also of the known and recognized laws of physics and chemistry, from material which we should call not living. It abolished the conception of life as an entity above and beyond the common properties of matter, and led to the conviction that the marvellous and exceptional qualities of that which we call living matter are nothing more nor less than an exceptionally complicated development of those chemical and physical properties which we recognize in a gradually ascending scale of evolution in the carbon compounds, containing nitrogen as well as oxygen, sulphur and hydrogen as constituent atoms of their enormous molecules. Thus mysticism was finally banished from the domain of biology, and zoology became one of the physical sciencesthe science which seeks to arrange and discuss the phenomena of animal life and form, as the outcome of the operation of the laws of physics and chemistry.

A subdivision of zoology which was at one time in favour is simply into morphology and physiology, the study of form and structure on the one hand, and the study of the activities and functions of the forms and structures of the other. But a logical division like this is not necessarily conducive to the ascertainment and remembrance of the historical progress and present significance of the science. No such distinction of mental activities as that involved in the division of the study of animal life into morphology and physiology has ever really existed: the investigator of animal forms has never entirely ignored the functions of the forms studied by him, and the experimental inquirer into the functions and properties of animal tissues and organs has always taken very careful account of the forms of those tissues and organs. A more instructive subdivision must be one which corresponds to the separate currents of thought and mental preoccupation which have been historically manifested in western Europe in the gradual evolution of what is to-day the great river of zoological doctrine to which they have all been rendered contributory.

=== Cell theory, embryology and germ theory ===
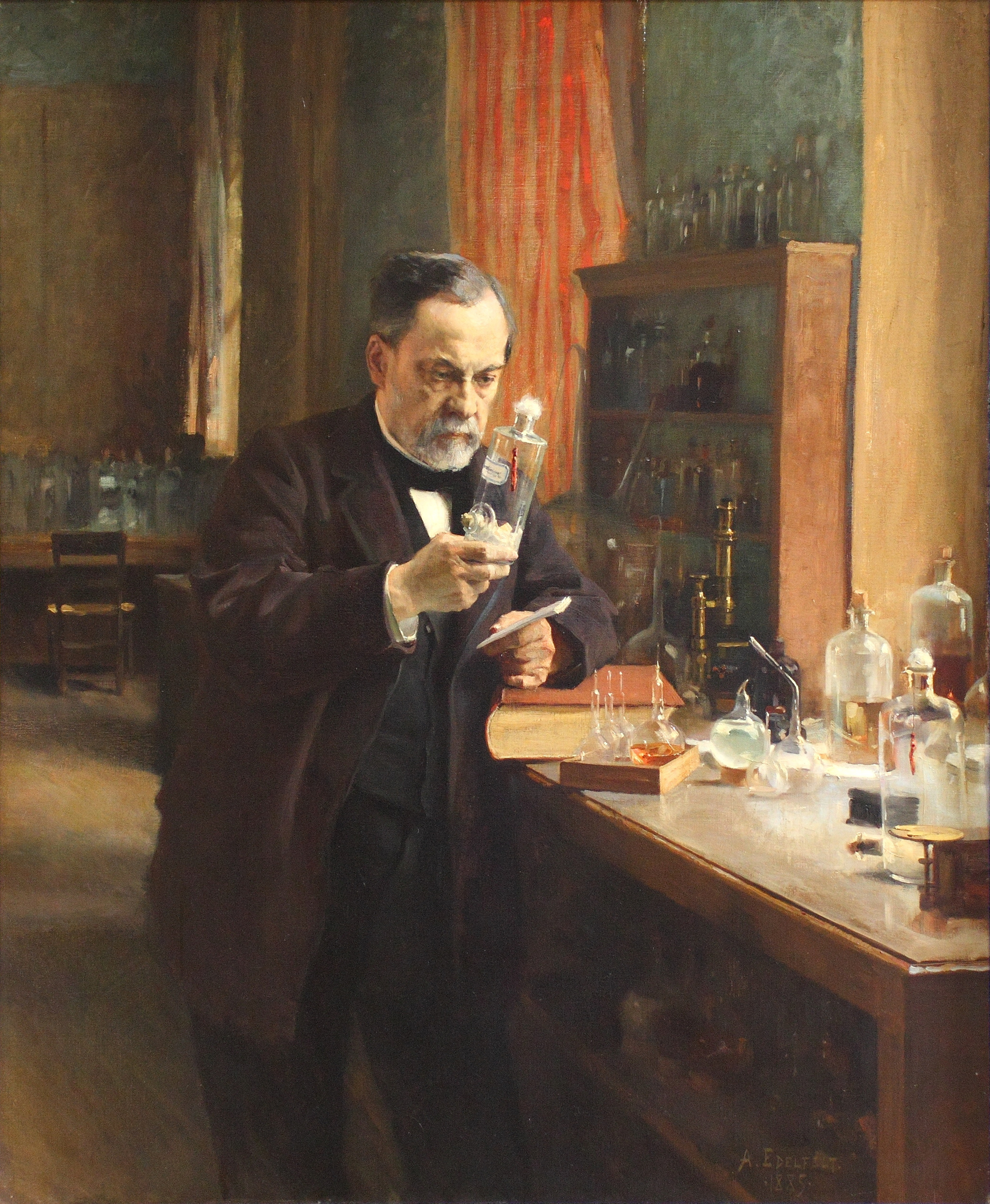
Innovative experimental methods such as Louis Pasteur's contributed to the young field of bacteriology in the late 19th century.

Cell theory led zoologists to re-envision individual organisms as interdependent assemblages of individual cells. Scientists in the rising field of cytology, armed with increasingly powerful microscopes and new staining methods, soon found that even single cells were far more complex than the homogeneous fluid-filled chambers described by earlier microscopists. Much of the research on cell reproduction came together in August Weismann's theory of heredity: he identified the nucleus (in particular chromosomes) as the hereditary material, proposed the distinction between somatic cells and germ cells (arguing that chromosome number must be halved for germ cells, a precursor to the concept of meiosis), and adopted Hugo de Vries's theory of pangenes. Weismannism was extremely influential, especially in the new field of experimental embryology.

By the 1880s, bacteriology was becoming a coherent discipline, especially through the work of Robert Koch, who introduced methods for growing pure cultures on agar gels containing specific nutrients in Petri dishes. The long-held idea that living organisms could easily originate from nonliving matter (spontaneous generation) was attacked in a series of experiments carried out by Louis Pasteur, while debates over vitalism vs. mechanism (a perennial issue since the time of Aristotle and the Greek atomists) continued apace.

=== Physiology ===
Over the course of the 19th century, the scope of physiology expanded greatly, from a primarily medically oriented field to a wide-ranging investigation of the physical and chemical processes of life—including plants, animals, and even microorganisms in addition to man. Living things as machines became a dominant metaphor in biological (and social) thinking. Physiologists such as Claude Bernard explored (through vivisection and other experimental methods) the chemical and physical functions of living bodies to an unprecedented degree, laying the groundwork for endocrinology (a field that developed quickly after the discovery of the first hormone, secretin, in 1902), biomechanics, and the study of nutrition and digestion. The importance and diversity of experimental physiology methods, within both medicine and zoology, grew dramatically over the second half of the 19th century. The control and manipulation of life processes became a central concern, and experiment was placed at the center of biological education.

== Twentieth century ==
At the beginning of the 20th century, zoological research was largely a professional endeavour. Most work was still done in the natural history mode, which emphasized morphological and phylogenetic analysis over experiment-based causal explanations. However, anti-vitalist experimental physiologists and embryologists, especially in Europe, were increasingly influential. The tremendous success of experimental approaches to development, heredity, and metabolism in the 1900s and 1910s demonstrated the power of experimentation in biology. In the following decades, experimental work replaced natural history as the dominant mode of research.

=== Early 20th century work (variation and heredity) ===
After publication of his work The Origin of Species, Darwin became interested in the animal and plant mechanisms that confer advantages to individual members of a species. Much important work was done by Fritz Muller (Für Darwin), by Hermann Müller (Fertilization of Plants by Insects), August Weismann, Edward B. Poulton and Abbott Thayer. There was considerable progress during this period in the field that would become known as genetics, the laws of variation and heredity (originally known as thremmatology). The progress of microscopy gave a clearer understanding of the origin of the egg-cell and sperm-cell and the process of fertilization.

==== Mendel and zoology ====
Mendel's experiments on cultivated varieties of plants were published in 1865, but attracted little notice until thirty-five years later, sixteen years after his death (see Mendelism). Mendel tried to gain a better understanding of heredity. His main experiments were with varieties of the edible pea. He chose a variety with one marked structural feature and crossed it with another variety in which that feature was absent. For example, he hybridized a tall variety, with a dwarf variety, a yellow-seeded variety with a green-seeded variety, and a smooth-seeded variety with a wrinkle-seeded variety. In each experiment, he concentrated on one character; after obtaining a first hybrid generation, he allowed the hybrids to self-fertilize, and recorded the number of individuals in the first, second, third, and fourth generations in which the chosen character appeared.

In the first hybrid generation, nearly all the individuals had the positive character, but in subsequent generations the positive character was not present in all individuals: half had the character and half did not. Thus the random pairing of two groups of reproductive cells yielded the proportion 1 PP, 2 PN, 1 NN, where P stands for the character and N for its absence – the character was present in three-quarters of the offspring and absent from a quarter. The failure of the character to distribute itself among all of the reproductive cells of a hybrid individual, and the limitation of its distribution to half only of those cells, prevents the swamping of a new character by interbreeding. The tendency of the proportions in the offspring is to give, in a series of generations, a reversion from the hybrid form PN to a race with the positive character and a race without it. This tendency favours the persistence of a new character of large volume suddenly appearing in a stock. The observations of Mendel thus favoured the view that the variations upon which natural selection acts are not small but large and discontinuous. However, it did not appear that large variations would be favoured any more than small ones, or that the eliminating action of natural selection upon an unfavourable variation could be checked.

Much confusion arose in discussions of this topic, because of defective nomenclature. Some authors used the word mutation only for large variations that appeared suddenly and that could be inherited, and fluctuation for small variations, whether they could be transmitted or not. Other authors used fluctuation only for small, acquired variations due to changes in food, moisture and other features of the environment. This kind of variation is not heritable, but the small variations Darwin thought important are. The best classification of the variations in organisms separates those that arise from congenital variations from those that arise from variations of the environment or the food-supply. The former are innate variations, the latter are "acquired variations". Both innate and acquired variations include some that are more and some that are less obvious. There are slight innate variations in every new generation of every species; their greatness or smallness so far as human perception goes is not of much significance, their importance for the origin of new species depends on whether they are valuable to the organism in the struggle for existence and reproduction. An imperceptible physiological difference might be of selective value, and it might carry with it correlated variations that may or may not appeal to the human eye, but are of no selective value themselves.

The views of Hugo de Vries and others about the importance of saltatory variation, the soundness of which was still not generally accepted in 1910, may be gathered from the article Mendelism. A due appreciation of the far-reaching results of correlated variation must, it appeared, give a new and distinct explanation of large mutations, discontinuous variation, and saltatory evolution. The analysis of the specific variations of organic form to determine the nature and limitation of a single character, and whether two variations of a structural unit can blend when one is transmitted by the male parent and the other by the female, were yet to be determined. It was not clear whether absolute blending was possible, or whether all apparent blending was only a more-or-less minutely subdivided mosaic of non-combinable characters of the parents.

Another important development of Darwin's conclusions deserves notice. The fact of variation was familiar: no two animals, even of the same brood, are alike. Jean-Baptiste Lamarck hypothesised that structural alterations acquired by a parent might be transmitted to the offspring, and as these are acquired by an animal or plant as a consequence of the action of the environment, the offspring would sometimes start with a greater fitness for those conditions than its parents started with. In turn, it would acquire a greater development of the same modification, which it would transmit to its offspring. Lamarck argued that, over several generations, a structural alteration might thus be acquired. The familiar illustration of Lamarck's hypothesis is that of the giraffe, whose long neck, he suggested, was acquired by the efforts of a short-necked race of herbivores who stretched their necks to reach the foliage of trees in a land where grass was deficient, the effort producing a longer neck of each generation, which was then transmitted to the next. This process is known as 'direct adaptation'.

Such structural adaptations are acquired by an animal in the course of its life, but are limited in degree and rare, rather than frequent and obvious. Whether acquired characters could be transmitted to the next generation was a very different issue. Darwin excluded any assumption of the transmission of acquired characters. He pointed to the fact of congenital variation, and showed that congenital variations are arbitrary and non-significant.

==== Congenital variation ====
At the beginning of the 20th century, the causes of congenital variation were obscure, although it was recognised that they were largely due to a mixing of the matter that constituted the fertilized germ or embryo-cell from two individuals. Darwin had shown that congenital variation was all-important. A popular illustration of the difference was this: a man born with four fingers only on his right hand might transmit this peculiarity to at least some of his children; but a man with one finger chopped off will produce children with five fingers. Darwin, influenced by some facts that seemed to favour the Lamarckian hypothesis, thought that acquired characters are sometimes transmitted, but did not consider that this mechanism was likely to be of great importance.

After Darwin's writings, there was an effort to find evidence for the transmission of acquired characters; ultimately, the Lamarckian hypothesis of transmission of acquired characters was not supported by evidence, and was dismissed. August Weismann argued from the structure of the egg-cell and sperm-cell, and from how and when they are derived in the growth of the embryo from the egg, that it was impossible that a change in parental structure could produce a representative change in the germ or sperm-cells.

The only evidence that seemed to support the Lamarckian hypothesis were the experiments of Charles Brown-Séquard, who produced epilepsy in guinea-pigs by bisection of the large nerves or spinal cord, which led him to believe that, in rare instances, the artificially-produced epilepsy and mutilation of the nerves was transmitted. The record of Brown-Séquard's original experiments was unsatisfactory, and attempts reproduce them were unsuccessful. Conversely, the vast number of experiments in the cropping of the tails and ears of domestic animals, as well as of similar operations on man, had negative results. Stories of tailless kittens, puppies, and calves, born from parents one of whom had been thus injured, are abundant, but failed to stand experimental examination.

While evidence of the transmission of an acquired character proved wanting, the a priori arguments in its favour were recognized as flawed, and cases that appeared to favour the Lamarckian assumption were found to be better explained by the Darwinian principle. For example, the occurrence of blind animals in caves and in the deep sea was a fact that even Darwin regarded as best explained by the atrophy of the eye in successive generations through the absence of light and consequent disuse. However, it was suggested that this is better explained by natural selection acting on congenital fortuitous variations. Some animals are born with distorted or defective eyes. If a number of some species of fish are swept into a cavern, those with perfect eyes would follow the light and eventually escape, leaving behind those with imperfect eyes to breed in the dark place. In every succeeding generation this would be the case, and even those with weak but still seeing eyes would escape, until only a pure race of blind animals would be left in the cavern.

==== Transmission ====
It was argued that the elaborate structural adaptations of the nervous system that underlie instincts must have been slowly built up by the transmission to offspring of acquired experience. It seemed hard to understand how complicated instincts could be due to the selection of congenital variations, or be explained except by the transmission of habits acquired by the parent. However, imitation of the parent by the young account for some, and there are cases in which elaborate actions must be due to the natural selection of a fortuitously-developed habit. Such cases are the habits of 'shamming dead' and the combined posturing and colour peculiarities of certain caterpillars (Lepidoptera larvae) that cause them to resemble dead twigs or similar objects. The advantage to the caterpillar is that it escapes (say) a bird that would, were it not deceived, attack and eat it. Preceding generations of caterpillars cannot have acquired this habit of posturing by experience; either a caterpillar postures and escapes, or it does not posture and is eaten – it is not half eaten and allowed to profit by experience. Thus, we seem justified in assuming that there are many movements of stretching and posturing possible to caterpillars, that some had a fortuitous tendency to one position, some to another, and, that among all the variety of habitual movements, one is selected and perpetuated because it happened to make the caterpillar look more like a twig.

==== Record of the past ====
Man, compared with other animals, has the fewest instincts and the largest brain in proportion to body size. He builds up, from birth onwards, his own mental mechanisms, and forms more of them, and takes longer in doing so, than any other animal. The later stages of evolution from ape-like ancestors have consisted in the acquisition of a larger brain and in the education of that brain. A new feature in organic development makes its appearance when we set out the facts of man's evolutionary history. This factor is the record of the past, which grows and develops by laws other than those affecting the perishable bodies of successive generations of mankind, so that man, by the interaction of the record and his educability, is subject to laws of development unlike those by which the rest of the living world is governed.

=== Ecology and environmental science ===
In the early 20th century, naturalists were faced with increasing pressure to add rigor and preferably experimentation to their methods, as the newly prominent laboratory-based biological disciplines had done. Ecology had emerged as a combination of biogeography with the biogeochemical cycle concept pioneered by chemists; field biologists developed quantitative methods such as the quadrat and adapted laboratory instruments and cameras for the field to further set their work apart from traditional natural history. Zoologists did what they could to mitigate the unpredictability of the living world, performing laboratory experiments and studying semi-controlled natural environments; new institutions like the Carnegie Station for Experimental Evolution and the Marine Biological Laboratory provided more controlled environments for studying organisms through their entire life cycles.

Charles Elton's studies of animal food chains was pioneering among the succession of quantitative methods that colonized the developing ecological specialties. Ecology became an independent discipline in the 1940s and 1950s after Eugene P. Odum synthesized many of the concepts of ecosystem ecology, placing relationships between groups of organisms (especially material and energy relationships) at the center of the field. In the 1960s, as evolutionary theorists explored the possibility of multiple units of selection, ecologists turned to evolutionary approaches. In population ecology, debate over group selection was brief but vigorous; by 1970, most zoologists agreed that natural selection was rarely effective above the level of individual organisms.

=== Classical genetics, the modern synthesis, and evolutionary theory ===
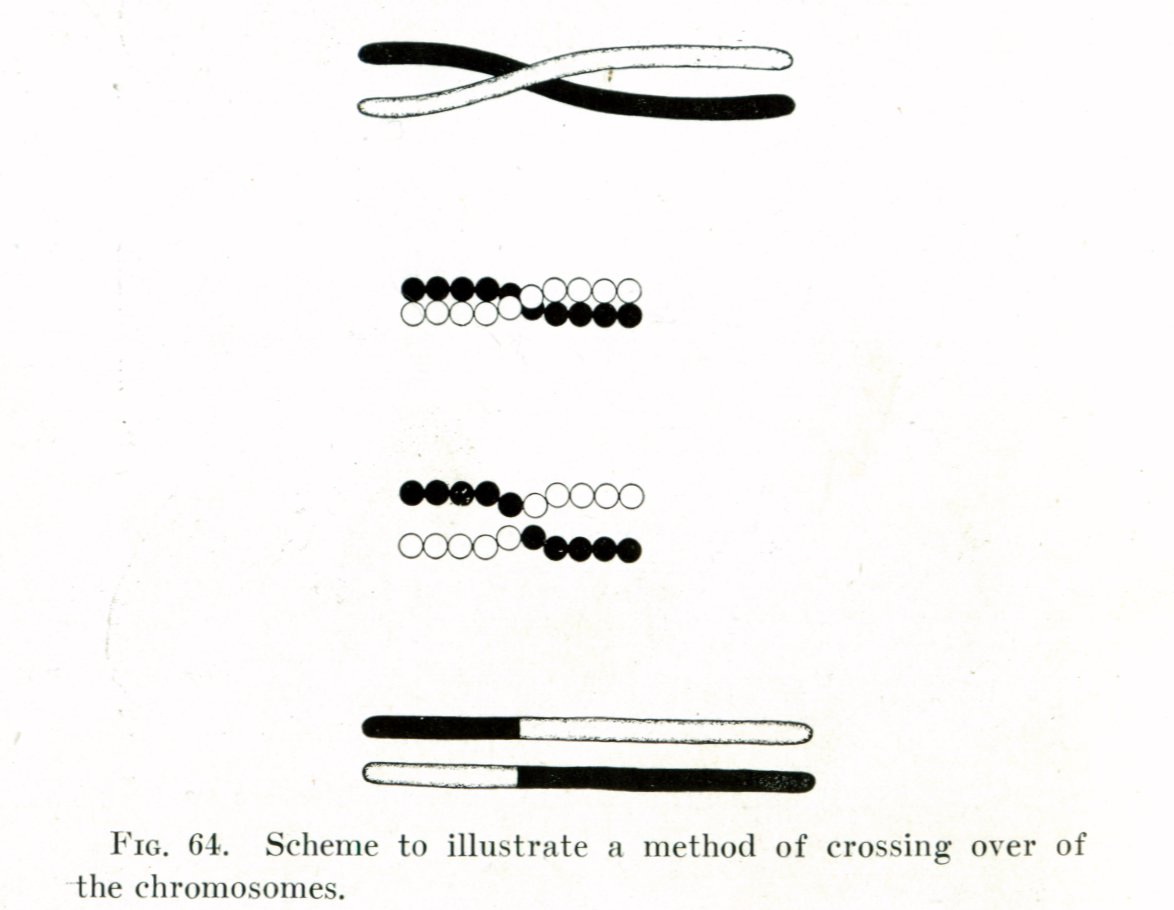
Thomas Hunt Morgan's illustration of crossing over, part of the Mendelian-chromosome theory of heredity

1900 marked the so-called rediscovery of Mendel: Hugo de Vries, Carl Correns, and Erich von Tschermak independently arrived at Mendel's laws (which were not actually present in Mendel's work). Soon after, cytologists (cell biologists) proposed that chromosomes were the hereditary material. Between 1910 and 1915, Thomas Hunt Morgan and the "Drosophilists" in his fly lab forged these two ideas—both controversial—into the "Mendelian-chromosome theory" of heredity. They quantified the phenomenon of genetic linkage and postulated that genes reside on chromosomes like beads on string; they hypothesized crossing over to explain linkage and constructed genetic maps of the fruit fly Drosophila melanogaster, which became a widely used model organism.

Hugo de Vries tried to link the new genetics with evolution; building on his work with heredity and hybridization, he proposed a theory of mutationism, which was widely accepted in the early 20th century. Lamarckism also had many adherents. Darwinism was seen as incompatible with the continuously variable traits studied by biometricians, which seemed only partially heritable. In the 1920s and 1930s—following the acceptance of the Mendelian-chromosome theory— the emergence of the discipline of population genetics, with the work of R.A. Fisher, J.B.S. Haldane and Sewall Wright, unified the idea of evolution by natural selection with Mendelian genetics, producing the modern synthesis. The inheritance of acquired characters was rejected, while mutationism gave way as genetic theories matured.

In the second half of the century the ideas of population genetics began to be applied in the new discipline of the genetics of behavior, sociobiology, and, especially in humans, evolutionary psychology. In the 1960s W.D. Hamilton and others developed game theory approaches to explain altruism from an evolutionary perspective through kin selection. The possible origin of higher organisms through endosymbiosis, and contrasting approaches to molecular evolution in the gene-centered view (which held selection as the predominant cause of evolution) and the neutral theory (which made genetic drift a key factor) spawned perennial debates over the proper balance of adaptationism and contingency in evolutionary theory.

In the 1970s Stephen Jay Gould and Niles Eldredge proposed the theory of punctuated equilibrium which holds that stasis is the most prominent feature of the fossil record, and that most evolutionary changes occur rapidly over relatively short periods of time. In 1980 Luis Alvarez and Walter Alvarez proposed the hypothesis that an impact event was responsible for the Cretaceous–Paleogene extinction event. Also in the early 1980s, statistical analysis of the fossil record of marine organisms published by Jack Sepkoski and David M. Raup led to a better appreciation of the importance of mass extinction events to the history of life on earth.

== Twenty-first century ==
Advances were made in analytical chemistry and physics instrumentation including improved sensors, optics, tracers, instrumentation, signal processing, networks, robots, satellites, and compute power for data collection, storage, analysis, modeling, visualization, and simulations. These technology advances allowed theoretical and experimental research including internet publication of zoological science. This enabled worldwide access to better measurements, theoretical models, complex simulations, theory predictive model experimentation, analysis, worldwide internet observational data reporting, open peer-review, collaboration, and internet publication.

== See also ==
- History of Zoology
- List of zoologists
- List of Russian zoologists
- Important Publications in Zoology
- Timeline of zoology
