= Greg Laden =

American anthropologist (born 1958)

- Born: Gregory Thomas Laden; 1958 (age 67–68)
- Education: University of the State of New York Regents College, Harvard University
- Children: 2 (one son, one daughter)
- Scientific career
- Fields: Biological anthropology
- Workplaces: University of Minnesota
- Thesis: Ethnoarchaeology and land use ecology of the Efe (Pygmies) of the Ituri Rain Forest, Zaire: a behavioral ecological study of land use patterns and foraging behavior (1992)
- Doctoral advisor: Irven DeVore

Gregory Thomas Laden is an American biological anthropologist and science blogger.

== Education ==
Born in 1958, Laden received his B.A. from the University of the State of New York's Regents College program in 1984, and his M.A. and Ph.D. from Harvard University in 1987 and 1992, respectively, where he was advised by Irven DeVore.

== Career ==
Laden has taught at multiple institutions, including, but not limited to, Harvard, the University of Minnesota, and Century College. In 1999, when he was on the faculty of the University of Minnesota, he co-authored a study in Current Anthropology that found that the practice of humans cooking food evolved because it allowed them to cook vegetables. He published a blog, "Greg Laden's Blog", on ScienceBlogs, where he focused on public controversies regarding multiple scientific topics, including global warming and evolution.
