= Von Baer's laws (embryology) =

Foundational theory of embryonic development (published 1828)

Embryology theories of Ernst Haeckel (following Meckel) and Karl Ernst von Baer compared. Von Baer denied any recapitulation of whole adult forms, though individual structures might be recapitulated.

In developmental biology, von Baer's laws of embryology (or laws of development) are four rules proposed by Karl Ernst von Baer to explain the observed patterns of embryonic development across different species.

Von Baer formulated the laws in his book On the Developmental History of Animals (German: Über Entwickelungsgeschichte der Thiere), published in 1828, while working at the University of Königsberg. He specifically intended to rebut Johann Friedrich Meckel's 1808 recapitulation theory. According to that theory, embryos pass through successive stages that represent the adult forms of less complex organisms in the course of development, and that ultimately reflects scala naturae (the great chain of being). Von Baer believed that such linear development is impossible. He posited that instead of linear progression, embryos started from one or a few basic forms that are similar in different animals, and then developed in a branching pattern into increasingly different organisms. Defending his ideas, he was also opposed to Charles Darwin's 1859 theory of common ancestry and descent with modification, and particularly to Ernst Haeckel's revised recapitulation theory with its slogan "ontogeny recapitulates phylogeny." Darwin was however broadly supportive of von Baer's view of the relationship between embryology and evolution.

== The laws ==
Von Baer described his laws in his book Über Entwickelungsgeschichte der Thiere. Beobachtung und Reflexion published in 1828. They are a series of statements generally summarised into four points, as translated by Thomas Henry Huxley in his Scientific Memoirs:

1. The more general characters of a large group appear earlier in the embryo than the more special characters.
2. From the most general forms the less general are developed, and so on, until finally the most special arises.
3. Every embryo of a given animal form, instead of passing through the other forms, rather becomes separated from them.
4. The embryo of a higher form never resembles any other form, but only its embryo.

== Description ==
Von Baer discovered the blastula (the early hollow ball stage of an embryo) and the development of the notochord (the stiffening rod along the back of all chordates, that forms after the blastula and gastrula stages). From his observations of these stages in different vertebrates, he realised that Johann Friedrich Meckel's recapitulation theory must be wrong. For example, he noticed that the yolk sac is found in birds, but not in frogs. According to the recapitulation theory, such structures should invariably be present in frogs because they were assumed to be at a lower level in the evolutionary tree. Von Baer concluded that while structures like the notochord are recapitulated during embryogenesis, whole organisms are not. He asserted that (as translated):

The embryo successively adds the organs that characterize the animal classes in the ascending scale. When the human embryo, for instance, is but a simple vesicle, it is an infusorian; when it has gained a liver, it is a mussel; with the appearance of the osseous system, it enters the class of fishes; and so forth, until it becomes a mammal and then a human being.

In terms of taxonomic hierarchy, according to von Baer, characters in the embryo are formed in top-to-bottom sequence, first from those of the largest and oldest taxon, the phylum, then in turn class, order, family, genus, and finally species.

== Reception ==
The laws received a mixed appreciation. While they were criticised in detail, they formed the foundation of modern embryology.

=== Charles Darwin ===
The most important supporter of von Baer's laws was Charles Darwin. Darwin came across von Baer's laws from the work of Johannes Peter Müller in 1842, and realised that it was a support for his own theory of descent with modification. Darwin was a critique of the recapitulation theory and agreed with von Baer that an adult animal is not reflected by an embryo of another animal, and only embryos of different animals appear similar. He wrote in his Origin of Species (first edition, 1859):

[The] adult [animal] differs from its embryo, owing to variations supervening at a not early age, and being inherited at a corresponding age. This process, whilst it leaves the embryo almost unaltered, continually adds, in the course of successive generations, more and more difference to the adult. Thus the embryo comes to be left as a sort of picture, preserved by nature, of the ancient and less modified condition of each animal. This view may be true, and yet it may never be capable of full proof.

Darwin also said:

It has already been casually remarked that certain organs in the individual, which when mature become widely different and serve for different purposes, are in the embryo exactly alike. The embryos, also, of distinct animals within the same class are often strikingly similar: a better proof of this cannot be given, than a circumstance mentioned by Agassiz, namely, that having forgotten to ticket the embryo of some vertebrate animal, he cannot now tell whether it be that of a mammal, bird, or reptile.

Darwin's attribution to Louis Agassiz was a mistake, and was corrected in the third edition as von Baer. He further explained in the later editions of Origin of Species (from third to sixth editions), and wrote:

It might be thought that the amount of change which the various parts and organs [of vertebrates] undergo in their development from the embryo to maturity would suffice as a standard of comparison; but there are cases, as with certain parasitic crustaceans, in which several parts of the structure become less perfect, so that the mature animal cannot be called higher than its larva. Von Baer's standard seems the most widely applicable and the best, namely, the amount of differentiation of the different parts (in the adult state, as I should be inclined to add) and their specialisation for different functions.

Even so, von Baer was a vociferous anti-Darwinist, although he believed in the common ancestry of species. Devoting much of his scholarly effort to criticising natural selection, his criticism culminated with his last work Über Darwins Lehre ("On Darwin's Doctrine"), published in the year of his death in 1876.

=== Later biologists ===
The British zoologist Adam Sedgwick studied the developing embryos of dogfish and chicken, and in 1894 noted a series of differences, such as the green yolk in the dogfish and yellow yolk in the chicken, absence of embryonic rim in chick embryos, absence of blastopore in dogfish, and differences in the gill slits and gill clefts. He concluded:

There is no stage of development in which the unaided eye would fail to distinguish between them with ease... A blind man could distinguish between them.

Modern biologists still debate the validity of the laws. In one line of argument, it is said that although every detail of von Baer's law may not work, the basic assumption that early developmental stages of animals are highly conserved is a biological fact. But an opposition says that there are conserved genetic conditions in embryos, but not the genetic events that govern the development. One example on the problem of von Baer's law is the formation of notochord before heart. This is due to the fact that heart is present in many invertebrates, which never have notochord.

== See also ==
- Evolutionary developmental biology
- Embryology
- Recapitulation theory
