= Recapitulation theory =

Idea that an animal's developmental stages resemble its evolutionary ancestors

The theory of recapitulation, also called the biogenetic law or embryological parallelism – usually summarized as "ontogeny recapitulates phylogeny" – is a historical hypothesis that the development of the embryo of an animal, from fertilization to gestation or hatching (ontogeny), goes through stages resembling or representing successive adult stages in the evolution of the animal's remote ancestors (phylogeny). It was formulated in the 1820s by Étienne Serres based on the work of Johann Friedrich Meckel, after whom it is also known as the Meckel–Serres law.

Since embryos evolve in different ways, the shortcomings of the theory had been recognized by the early 20th century, and it had been relegated to "biological mythology" by the mid-20th century. New discoveries in evolutionary developmental biology are providing explanations for these phenomena on a molecular level.

Analogies to recapitulation theory have been formulated in other fields, including cognitive development and music criticism.

== Embryology ==
=== Meckel, Serres, Geoffroy ===
The idea of recapitulation was first formulated in biology from the 1790s onwards by the German natural philosophers Johann Friedrich Meckel and Carl Friedrich Kielmeyer, and by Étienne Serres after which, Marcel Danesi states, it soon gained the status of a supposed biogenetic law.

The embryological theory was formalised by Serres in 1824–1826, based on Meckel's work, in what became known as the "Meckel-Serres Law". This attempted to link comparative embryology with a "pattern of unification" in the organic world. It was supported by Étienne Geoffroy Saint-Hilaire, and became a prominent part of his ideas. It suggested that past transformations of life could have been through environmental causes working on the embryo, rather than on the adult as in Lamarckism. These naturalistic ideas led to disagreements with Georges Cuvier. The theory was widely supported in the Edinburgh and London schools of higher anatomy around 1830, notably by Robert Edmond Grant, but was opposed by Karl Ernst von Baer's ideas of divergence, and attacked by Richard Owen in the 1830s.

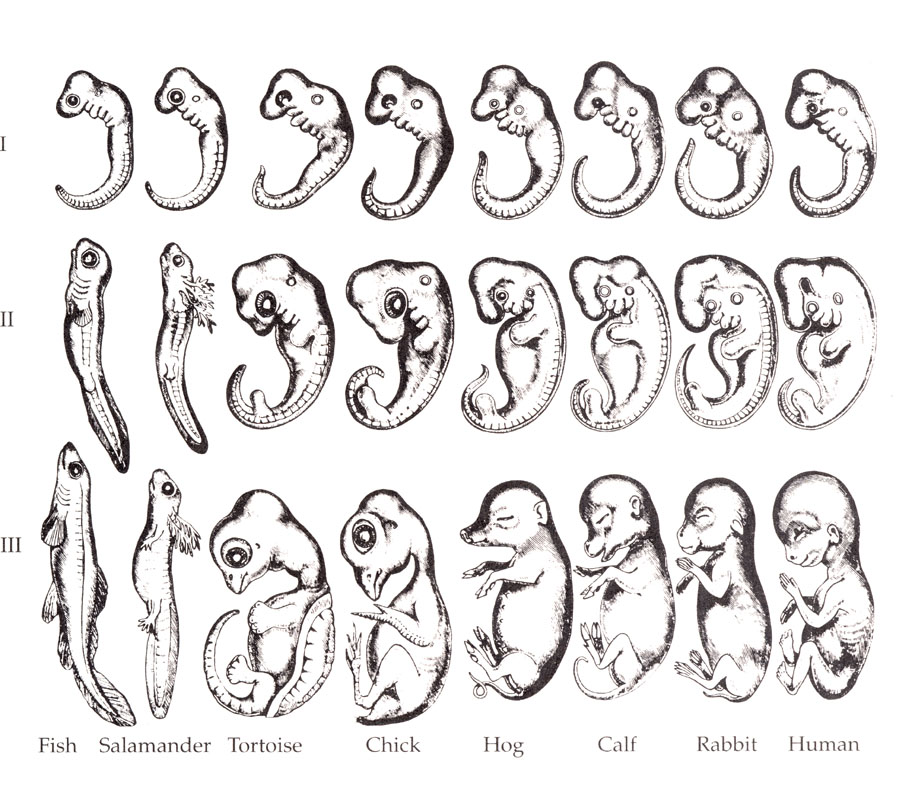
George Romanes's 1892 copy of Ernst Haeckel's controversial embryo drawings (Note: George Romanes's 1892 version of the figure is often attributed incorrectly to Haeckel.)

=== Haeckel ===
Ernst Haeckel (1834–1919) attempted to synthesize the ideas of Lamarckism and Goethe's Naturphilosophie with Charles Darwin's concepts. While often seen as rejecting Darwin's theory of branching evolution for a more linear Lamarckian view of progressive evolution, this is not accurate: Haeckel used the Lamarckian picture to describe the ontogenetic and phylogenetic history of individual species, but agreed with Darwin about the branching of all species from one, or a few, original ancestors. Since early in the twentieth century, Haeckel's "biogenetic law" has been refuted on many fronts.

Haeckel's formulation of the theory is mostly summed up in the dictum "ontogeny recapitulates phylogeny". In the original German version of the 1866 General Morphology, Haeckel uses a passive voice, with the word "short" ("brief") and often the word "rapid" when summarizing his observations of different organisms and their history. The notion later became simply known as the recapitulation theory, and the view as recapitulationism. Ontogeny is the growth (size change) and development (structure change) of an individual organism; phylogeny is the evolutionary history of a species. Haeckel claimed that the development of advanced species passes through stages represented by adult organisms of more primitive species. For example, Haeckel proposed that the pharyngeal grooves between the pharyngeal arches in the neck of the human embryo not only roughly resembled gill slits of fish, but directly represented an adult "fishlike" developmental stage, signifying a fishlike ancestor.

Haeckel produced embryo drawings that often overemphasized similarities between embryos of related species. Modern biology rejects the literal and universal form of Haeckel's theory, such as its possible application to behavioural ontogeny, i.e. the psychomotor development of young animals and human children.

=== Contemporary criticism ===
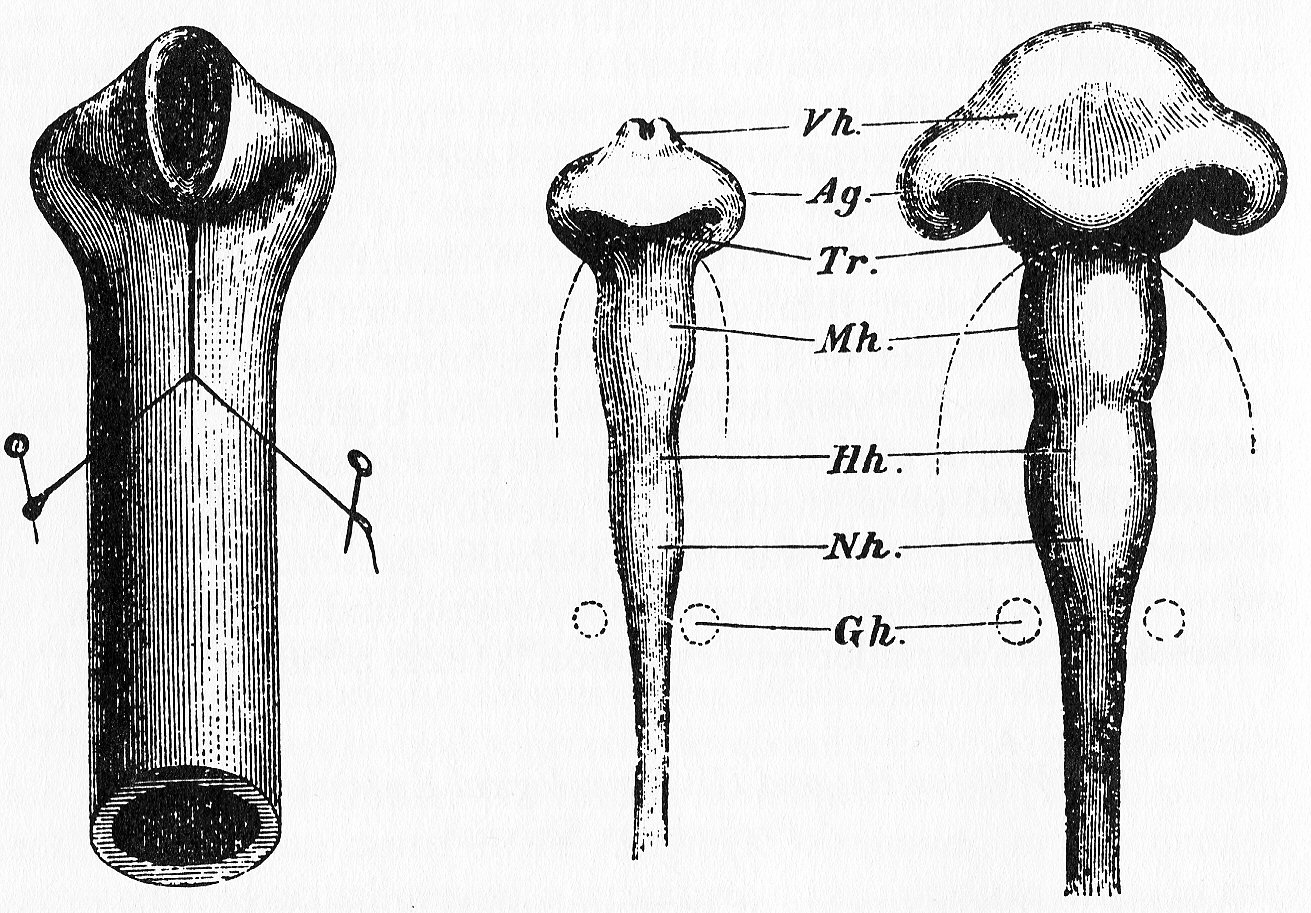
Drawing by Wilhelm His of chick brain compared to folded rubber tube, 1874. Ag (Anlage) = Optic lobes, matching bulges in rubber tube.

Haeckel's theory and drawings were criticised by his contemporary, the anatomist Wilhelm His Sr. (1831–1904), who had developed a rival "causal-mechanical theory" of human embryonic development. His's work specifically criticised Haeckel's methodology, arguing that the shapes of embryos were caused most immediately by mechanical pressures resulting from local differences in growth. These differences were, in turn, caused by "heredity". He compared the shapes of embryonic structures to those of rubber tubes that could be slit and bent, illustrating these comparisons with accurate drawings. Stephen Jay Gould noted in his 1977 book Ontogeny and Phylogeny that his attack on Haeckel's recapitulation theory was far more fundamental than that of any empirical critic, as it effectively stated that Haeckel's "biogenetic law" was irrelevant.

Embryology theories of Ernst Haeckel and Karl Ernst von Baer compared

Darwin proposed that embryos resembled each other since they shared a common ancestor, which presumably had a similar embryo, but that development did not necessarily recapitulate phylogeny: he saw no reason to suppose that an embryo at any stage resembled an adult of any ancestor. Darwin supposed further that embryos were subject to less intense selection pressure than adults, and had therefore changed less.

=== Modern status ===
Modern evolutionary developmental biology (evo-devo) follows von Baer, rather than Darwin, in pointing to active evolution of embryonic development as a significant means of changing the morphology of adult bodies. Two of the key principles of evo-devo, namely that changes in the timing (heterochrony) and positioning (heterotopy) within the body of aspects of embryonic development would change the shape of a descendant's body compared to an ancestor's, were first formulated by Haeckel in the 1870s. These elements of his thinking about development have thus survived, whereas his theory of recapitulation has not.

The Haeckelian form of recapitulation theory is considered defunct. Embryos do undergo a period or phylotypic stage where their morphology is strongly shaped by their phylogenetic position, rather than selective pressures, but that means only that they resemble other embryos at that stage, not ancestral adults as Haeckel had claimed. The modern view is summarised by the University of California Museum of Paleontology:

Embryos do reflect the course of evolution, but that course is far more intricate and quirky than Haeckel claimed. Different parts of the same embryo can even evolve in different directions. As a result, the Biogenetic Law was abandoned, and its fall freed scientists to appreciate the full range of embryonic changes that evolution can produce—an appreciation that has yielded spectacular results in recent years as scientists have discovered some of the specific genes that control development.

== Applications to other areas ==
The idea that ontogeny recapitulates phylogeny has been applied to some other areas.

=== Cognitive development ===
The English philosopher Herbert Spencer was one of the most energetic proponents of using evolutionary ideas to explain many phenomena. In 1861, five years before Haeckel first published on the subject, Spencer proposed a possible basis for a cultural recapitulation theory of education with the following claim:

If there be an order in which the human race has mastered its various kinds of knowledge, there will arise in every child an aptitude to acquire these kinds of knowledge in the same order... Education is a repetition of civilization in little.

— Herbert Spencer

The American psychologist G. Stanley Hall used Haeckel's theories as the basis for his theories of child development. His most influential work, "Adolescence: Its Psychology and Its Relations to Physiology, Anthropology, Sociology, Sex, Crime, Religion and Education" in 1904 suggested that each individual's life course recapitulated humanity's evolution from "savagery" to "civilization". Though he has influenced later childhood development theories, Hall's conception is now generally considered racist. Developmental psychologist Jean Piaget favored a weaker version of the formula, according to which ontogeny parallels phylogeny because the two are subject to similar external constraints.

The Austrian pioneer of psychoanalysis, Sigmund Freud, approved of Haeckel's doctrine. He was trained as a biologist under the influence of recapitulation theory during its heyday, and retained a Lamarckian outlook with justification from the recapitulation theory. Freud distinguished between physical and mental recapitulation, in which the differences would become an essential argument for his theory of neuroses. Gould (1977) described him as a "devout recapitulationist".

In the late 20th century, studies of symbolism and learning in the field of cultural anthropology suggested that "both biological evolution and the stages in the child's cognitive development follow much the same progression of evolutionary stages as that suggested in the archaeological record".

=== Music criticism ===
The musicologist Richard Taruskin in 2005 applied the phrase "ontogeny becomes phylogeny" to the process of creating and recasting music history, often to assert a perspective or argument. For example, the peculiar development of the works by modernist composer Arnold Schoenberg (here an "ontogeny") is generalized in many histories into a "phylogeny" – a historical development ("evolution") of Western music toward atonal styles of which Schoenberg is a representative. Such historiographies of the "collapse of traditional tonality" are faulted by music historians as asserting a rhetorical rather than historical point about tonality's "collapse".

Taruskin developed a variation of the motto into the pun "ontogeny recapitulates ontology" to refute the concept of "absolute music" advancing the socio-artistic theories of the musicologist Carl Dahlhaus. Ontology is the investigation of what exactly something is, and Taruskin asserts that an art object becomes that which society and succeeding generations made of it. For example, Johann Sebastian Bach's St. John Passion, composed in the 1720s, was appropriated by the Nazi regime in the 1930s for propaganda. Taruskin claims the historical development of the St John Passion (its ontogeny) as a work with an anti-Semitic message does, in fact, inform the work's identity (its ontology), even though that was an unlikely concern of the composer. Music or even an abstract visual artwork can not be truly autonomous ("absolute") because it is defined by its historical and social reception.

As "America's premier ethnologist," writes Gould (1977), Wesley Powell (1889) "compared child development with human history in tracing the evolution of music "from dance to symphony". Gould (1977) cites W. H. Auden, who said of Igor Stravinsky's life work that it "recapitulates or mirrors" history of art.

== See also ==
- Glottogony
- Stage theory
- Psychomotor patterning

== Sources ==
- Danesi, Marcel (1993). Vico, metaphor, and the origin of language. Indiana University Press. p. 65. ISBN 0253113709.
- Gould, Stephen Jay (1977). Ontogeny and Phylogeny. Cambridge Mass.: Belknap Press of Harvard University Press. ISBN 0-674-63941-3.
- Desmond, Adrian J. (1989). The politics of evolution: morphology, medicine, and reform in radical London. Chicago: University of Chicago Press. ISBN 0-226-14374-0.
- Mayr, Ernst (1994). "Recapitulation Reinterpreted: The Somatic Program". The Quarterly Review of Biology. 69 (2): 223–232. doi:10.1086/418541. JSTOR 3037718. S2CID 84670449.
