= ScienceDebate.org =

Science Debate
- Formation: 2008
- Purpose: Science Debate asks candidates, elected officials, the public and the media to focus more on science policy issues of vital importance to modern life. As a registered 501(c)(3), Science Debate is nonpartisan. We encourage everyone to ask their candidates to discuss and debate their science and technology policies for the well-being of our nation and society.
- Key people: Matthew Chapman, Sheril Kirshenbaum, Chris Mooney, Shawn Lawrence Otto, Lawrence Krauss, Austin Dacey, Darlene Cavalier, Michael Halpern

Science Debate is a nonpartisan American nonprofit organization working to elevate the importance of science and technology in the national public dialogue. They ask candidates running of office to share their science policy perspectives before Election Day so that every politician arrives in office prepared to meet the 21st centuries greatest challenges on day one. Driven by the vital role that science and technology play in the health, environmental, and economic well-being of society, Science Debate strives to provide voters with sufficient and meaningful information on these key issues when electing people to serve in public office.

The organization has the support of 24 Nobel laureates; 172 leaders of scientific institutions; 108 university presidents and provosts; and 55 current and former business leaders (such as company presidents, CEOs, and chairpersons). Well-known signatories include: actors Johnny Depp and Mark Ruffalo, presidential science adviser John Holdren, former energy secretary Steven Chu, inventor Elon Musk, actor/producer David Schwimmer, and educator Bill Nye.

== History ==
=== Founding of Science Debate ===
In the run-up to the 2008 presidential election, the lack of discussion about science and technology issues caught the attention of film director and screenwriter Matthew Chapman. Together with science journalist Chris Mooney, science writer Sheril Kirshenbaum, screenwriter and science advocate Shawn Lawrence Otto, theoretical physicist and cosmologist Lawrence Krauss, and science philosopher Austin Dacey, Science Debate 2008 was created. Shortly thereafter, Science Cheerleader founder Darlene Cavalier and science advocate Michael Halpern joined the team.

Within weeks of its founding, people and organizations from across the political spectrum signed on directly. This included prominent institutions such as the American Association for the Advancement of Science (AAAS) and the U.S. National Academies, as well as political movers ranging from John Podesta, President Bill Clinton’s former chief of staff, on the left to Newt Gingrich, former House Speaker, on the right. Collectively, by counting the members in the signatory organizations, Science Debate represents more than 125 million people.

=== Science Debate in 2008 ===
Throughout 2008, there were many calls for the candidates to participate in a science debate. On the eve of the Democratic National Convention, then nominee Barack Obama agreed to participate in an online “debate.” He formed a science advisory team that included Harold Varmus to help him answer the questions. Days later, Senator John McCain agreed to a “debate” in this format as well. The candidates’ answers to “The Fourteen Top Science Questions Facing America,” covering climate change, energy, health care, space, the environment, and the research drivers of economic competitiveness were published in Nature. Science Debate's story and the candidates' responses made nearly a billion media impressions.

=== Science Debate in 2012 ===
In partnership with Scientific American, Science Debate got President Obama and Republican nominee Mitt Romney to address fourteen questions on some of the biggest scientific and technological challenges facing the nation. Scientific American, the group’s media partner in 2012, published the answers and rated them based on the current science. The process of soliciting responses from the candidates and subsequent analysis of the answers was the subject of much conversation in the media during both the primaries and general election.

=== Science Debate in 2016 ===
For the 2016 election cycle, Science Debate signed with a major television network as a media partner. On October 8, 2015, Science Debate and Research!America commissioned a poll of American attitudes about science and politics. Conducted with 1,002 American adults of voting age, an overwhelming majority (87%) said it is important that candidates for President and Congress have a basic understanding of the science informing public policy issues, including majorities across the political spectrum (92% of Democrats, 90% of Republicans, and 79% of Independents). Americans also said the presidential candidates should participate in a debate to discuss key science-based challenges facing the United States, such as healthcare, climate change, energy, education, innovation and the economy (91% of Democrats, 88% of Republicans and 78% of Independents). The poll prompted major news outlets to ask why the candidates aren't addressing science issues.

On January 11, 2016, Science Debate released a PSA in which children ask the candidates for President to discuss various scientific issues including climate change, clean drinking water and the honey bee colony collapse problem. The video garnered significant media coverage, inspiring writers to echo the children's call for increased discussion of science.

On August 10 2016, Science Debate released the 20 top science questions. All four major candidates: President Donald Trump, Senator Hillary Clinton, Governor Gary Johnson, and Jill Stein responded in writing to the 2016 Science Debate Q&A.”

=== Science Debate in 2018 ===
In 2018, Science Debate expanded to ask all 2018 House, Senate and Gubernatorial candidates to participate in answering 10 questions about science policy. The first responses were released on January 3, 2018.

=== Science Debate in 2023 ===
In spring of 2023, Science Debate was renamed Science on the Ballot and joined the National Science Policy Network.
