= The Republican Brain =

2012 book by Chris Mooney

The Republican Brain: The Science of Why They Deny Science — and Reality
- Author: Chris Mooney
- Language: English
- Subjects: Conservatism in the United States, Republican Party, antiscience
- Publisher: Wiley
- Publication date: 2012
- Publication place: United States
- Media type: Print
- Pages: 327
- ISBN: 9781118094518
- OCLC: 773429781

The Republican Brain: The Science of Why They Deny Science — and Reality is a 2012 book about the psychological basis for many Republicans' rejection of mainstream scientific theories, as well as theories of economics and history, by the American journalist Chris Mooney.

== Reception ==
The Financial Times gave the book a favorable review, describing it as an "intelligent, nuanced and persuasive account" of psychological differences in political behavior.

Alissa Quart, in a New York Times opinion piece, cited conservative writers Alex Berezow and Hank Campbell who equated Mooney's argument with eugenics. It was criticized by American conservative Jonah Goldberg, who tried to associate it with "conservative phrenology". Mooney responded, stating that Goldberg had mispresented his book in several respects. Mooney also stated that Goldberg exhibited "precisely the traits he seeks to deny: ideological defensiveness, a lack of nuance, and a deeply unwarranted and overconfident sense of certainty". Mooney later rebutted a similar criticism by Andrew Ferguson and stated that Ferguson dismissed science himself while attacking the book.

Paul Krugman wrote in The New York Times that Mooney makes a good point: the personality traits associated with modern conservatism, particularly a lack of openness, make the modern Republican Party hostile to the idea of objective inquiry.

== Publication information ==
Mooney, Chris (2012). The Republican Brain: The Science of Why They Deny Science — and Reality. Wiley. ISBN 9781118094518.

== See also ==
- Antiscience
- Agnotology
- Climate change policy of the United States
- List of books about the politics of science
- Merchants of Doubt
- Politicization of science
- William R. Steiger
