= The Republican War on Science =

2005 book by Chris Mooney

- Author: Chris Mooney
- Publisher: Basic Books
- Publication date: 2005
- ISBN: 9780465046751

The Republican War on Science is a 2005 book by Chris Mooney, an American journalist who focuses on the politics of science policy. In the book, Mooney discusses the Republican Party leadership's stance on science, and in particular that of the George W. Bush administration, with regard to issues such as climate change denialism, intelligent design, bioethics, alternative medicine, pollution, separation of church and state, and the government funding of education, research, and environmental protection. The book argues that the administration regularly distorted and/or suppressed scientific research to further its own political aims.

The book was reviewed in Science and Nature Medicine as well as the popular press. It was featured on the cover of The New York Times Book Review and selected as an "Editors' Choice" by The New York Times, which described it as "[a] frankly polemical survey of scientific findings and procedures in collision with political operations."

Filmmaker Morgan Spurlock (of Super Size Me fame) optioned the rights for the book to create a documentary film, but in 2008 announced that he had released the option.

== Reviews ==
=== In scientific journals ===
A review in Science by Naomi Oreskes states the author recounts the 20-year campaign by "influential Republicans—initially in Congress and now also in the White House—in concert with determined allies in private industry and fundamentalist Christian organizations" to systematically deny, disparage and misrepresent scientific information related to public policy. She gave the following list of topics: "acid rain, global warming, the efficacy of condoms in preventing the spread of sexually transmitted diseases, the health impacts of excess dietary sugar and fat, the alleged link between abortion and breast cancer, the status of endangered species, the efficacy of abstinence-only sex education programs, the therapeutic potential of adult stem cells, and more." Oreskes goes on to detail the tactics used in the attempt to mislead both the public and politicians, "misrepresenting real debates, exaggerating uncertainty, interfering with the activities of expert agencies, trumpeting the views of outlier scientists whose interpretations are rarely to be found in the refereed literature, and attacking the integrity of genuine experts." She states that Mooney points out that multiple misinformation campaigns have involved the same individuals and groups. Oreskes concludes, "Mooney's book makes it clear that when sensible people stand on the sidelines, a great deal of nonsense can be spread."

Michael Stebbins wrote in Nature Medicine: "This book should serve as a harsh wake-up call to the scientific community and the American public." He stated that Mooney "painstakingly documents the roots of the efforts to undercut the influence of science on national policy and the relentless politicization of US science policy by conservatives working on behalf of the Republican Party." He notes that the author clearly documents the "Bush administrations' attacks on the integrity of science information" listing examples that include some of those mentioned by Oreskes and "undercutting the Clean Air Act and the Endangered Species Act, and stacking agencies and advisory committees with unqualified ideologues." Stebbins credits the book with providing context by detailing the tactics employed by "conservative Republicans" and establishing the roots of these undercutting techniques with examples from the last 40 years. He goes on to state, "Mooney's documentation of the willful manipulation of science on the part of conservatives to suit an agenda is well supported and nauseating." Stebbins addresses two criticisms of the book: the first, that it doesn't explain the science involved, which he explains is not the purpose of the book, and the second, that it doesn't detail the misuse of science by Democrats and liberals, which he dismisses as untrue. He finds issue with the last chapter, which proposes solutions, stating, "His suggestions are sound and well thought out, but seem more of an afterthought than a real goal of the book."

Daniel Sarewitz panned the book in a review in Issues in Science and Technology, describing it as a "tiresome polemic masquerading as a defense of scientific purity."

=== In the popular press ===
In a positive review in Scientific American, Boyce Rensenberger described the book as "a well-researched, closely argued and amply referenced indictment of the right wing's assault on science and scientists." Lisa Margonelli of The New York Times Book Review wrote that Mooney "juggled extensive research and sharp arguments [...] with precision and a showman’s wink that made his unpromising subject fun."

Keay Davidson wrote in the Washington Post that "Mooney's political heart is in the right place" but says "Mooney is like a judge who interprets a law one way to convict his enemies and another way to acquit his friends."

Writing in The New York Times, John Horgan said of the book that the prose was "often clunky and clichéd", but explains that Mooney "addresses a vitally important topic and gets it basically right." Horgan defends the book against another reviewer's criticism, saying "the journalist Keay Davidson faults Mooney for not acknowledging how hard it can be to distinguish good science from bad... But in many of the cases that [Mooney] examines, demarcation is easy, because one side has an a priori commitment to something other than the truth— God or money, to put it bluntly."

Stuart Derbyshire, a senior lecturer at the University of Birmingham School of Psychology, praises Mooney and notes that he explained how Republicans had manipulated the uncertainty in science "to ensure that Congress rarely hears any consensus opinion that may damage a Bush policy." Derbyshire agrees with Mooney's claim that there is Republican "flagrant twisting" of research findings and that it "violates the integrity of science."

== Media ==
Mooney was interviewed about the book on Science Friday.

== Publishing information ==
Mooney, Chris (2005). The Republican War on Science. Basic Books. ISBN 9780465046751.

== See also ==
- Antiscience
- Agnotology
- Climate change policy of the United States
- The Hockey Stick and the Climate Wars
- List of books about the politics of science
- Merchants of Doubt
- Politicization of science
- William R. Steiger
