= Unscientific America =

2009 book by Chris Mooney

- Author: Chris Mooney; Sheril Kirshenbaum
- Language: English
- Genre: Popular science
- Publisher: Basic Books
- Publication date: 2009
- Pages: 224
- ISBN: 978-0-465-01305-0
- OCLC: 436089164

Unscientific America: How Scientific Illiteracy Threatens Our Future is a nonfiction book by Chris Mooney and Sheril Kirshenbaum. It was a New York Times best seller. In the book, the authors tackle the problem of scientific illiteracy in America. The authors criticize scientists for talking down to the misinformed and insulting the religious while calling for more friendly and magnanimous science advocates. They also blame the New Atheist movement, the creation–evolution controversy, the entertainment industry, the media, and science skeptics.

== Reception ==
=== Science press ===
The journal Science Communication gave the book a favourable review, noting that the arguments presented "may make the Ph.D. crowd even more cranky than usual." Indeed, the book did spark significant debate particularly on-line. Seed magazine selected Unscientific America as one to "read now" although it was subsequently more critical of certain aspects of the book. The BMJ, while supporting the authors' assessment of the problem, was critical of the proposed solution. It said that the book sometimes "reads like an overlong and somewhat condescending whine about why science and scientists are not sufficiently appreciated." The New Scientist was similarly supportive of the description of the problem while being critical of the solution arguing that "by looking only at science, Unscientific America misses the big picture." American Scientist called it "at best, a thin and unsatisfying broth." Science was also critical calling the book "slight in both length and substance" and the analysis it contains "shallow and unreflective". This review was itself criticized by Donald Marcus of Baylor College of Medicine, who called it "a dismissive rant that misrepresents the text." PZ Myers, who was criticised in the book, stated in his review that "It's not a badly written book, but it's something worse: it's utterly useless."

=== Other media ===
California Bookwatch gave it a positive review. Kenneth Krause gave it a mixed to negative review in The Humanist criticizing the lack of an explanation of "how we can interest and invest the popular media in the serious science their viewers and subscribers have so evidently rejected" while characterizing the book with Chicken Little analogies. In the popular press Gerry Rising of The Buffalo News wrote, "This important book makes clear that the turn back toward science after the strong opposition of the Bush administration, [...], falls far short of solving our nation's problems." National Defense magazine said the authors had "captured the current zietgeist" in an analysis of the challenges of recruiting and retaining qualified young professionals in the defense industry. Kirshenbaum was interviewed about the book on Science Friday.

== Publication information ==
Mooney, Chris; Kirshenbaum, Sheril (2009). Unscientific America: How Scientific Illiteracy Threatens Our Future. Basic Books. ISBN 978-0-465-01305-0.

== See also ==
- Antiscience
- Agnotology
- List of books about the politics of science
- Politicization of science
