= Storm World =

Book by Chris Mooney

Storm World: Hurricanes, Politics, and the Battle over Global Warming
- Author: Chris Mooney
- Publication date: 2007
- ISBN: 9780151012879

Storm World: Hurricanes, Politics, and the Battle over Global Warming is a 2007 book by Chris Mooney. Mooney discusses tensions between two different approaches to analyzing global warming and its effect on hurricanes.

== Overview ==
After witnessing the devastation of his mother's house in Hurricane Katrina Mooney was concerned that government policy failed to consider worst-case scenarios when planning for the future even after that disaster. He explores whether global warming will affect hurricanes in general even if it cannot explain the specifics of any individual storm. Mooney found there were two camps in storm research one that felt the field should be based on data and another looking into deductions based on theories derived from physics. Surrounding this divide are politics, personalities and the drama of powerful storms. The question of the effect of global warming on storms and the difficulty reaching conclusions intensified the conflict. Mooney renders this into an accessible and compelling narrative with vivid portrayals of the scientists, accounts of new discoveries and their acceptance or denial by scientists and politicians. The integration of both research methods by some scientists gives Mooney hope and he concludes that in order to be effective scientists must be skilled communicators.

Storm World chronicles the history of the field of storm research from "the American Storm Controversy" a running disagreement in the 1800s between William Redfield whose observations led him to conclude that hurricanes were whirlwinds and James Pollard Espy who theorized convection, with water rising up a chimney, was the cause of hurricanes. It covers the clash of ideas in the 1950s between observationalists including Robert Simpson comparing hurricanes to "heat engines" and theorists and early computer modelers who advocated a mathematical theory Conditional Instability of the Second Kind (CISK). These early disputes set the stage for the current debate. Mooney details William Gray's changing role from groundbreaking theorist to climate change denying anti-theorist set against the background of the increasing public spotlight and urgency to develop a working understanding of storms and global warming in the aftermath of Hurricane Katrina.

== Reception ==
Lisa Margonelli, reviewing Storm World for the New York Times, describes it as "a well-researched, nuanced book that suffers from poor organization and a lack of pizazz."

In a mixed review in the Los Angeles Times Thomas Hayden wrote that Mooney deftly handled the complexity of the questions surrounding global warming and its effect on hurricanes. He praised Mooney as a writer and the timeliness of publication while pointing to continuity problems, a lack of integration and repetition. In particular he describes a later chapter on the most recent developments in hurricane and climate science as "tacked on just before the conclusion, so we learn important matters of substance after we've heard all the arguments." While saying that, "Mooney has a talent for humanizing the science and scientists" he criticizes the author for focusing too much on the over the top behavior of William Gray rather than presenting other researchers critiques of the subject. He continues noting Mooney's research is apparent throughout and that, "he does a fine job of sifting through complexities and presenting the science in an engaging and readable package." Hayden concludes, "Mooney catches real science in the act and, in so doing, weaves a story as intriguing as it is important."

It was selected as one of the best non-fiction books of year in 2007 by Publishers Weekly.

== Publication ==
Mooney, Chris C. (2007). Storm World: Hurricanes, Politics, and the Battle over Global Warming. Houghton Mifflin Harcourt. ISBN 9780151012879.

== See also ==
- Antiscience
- Agnotology
- Climate change policy of the United States
- List of books about the politics of science
- Merchants of Doubt
- Politicization of science
- Tropical Cyclones and Global Warming
