= Peter Agre =

American physician and academic (born 1949)

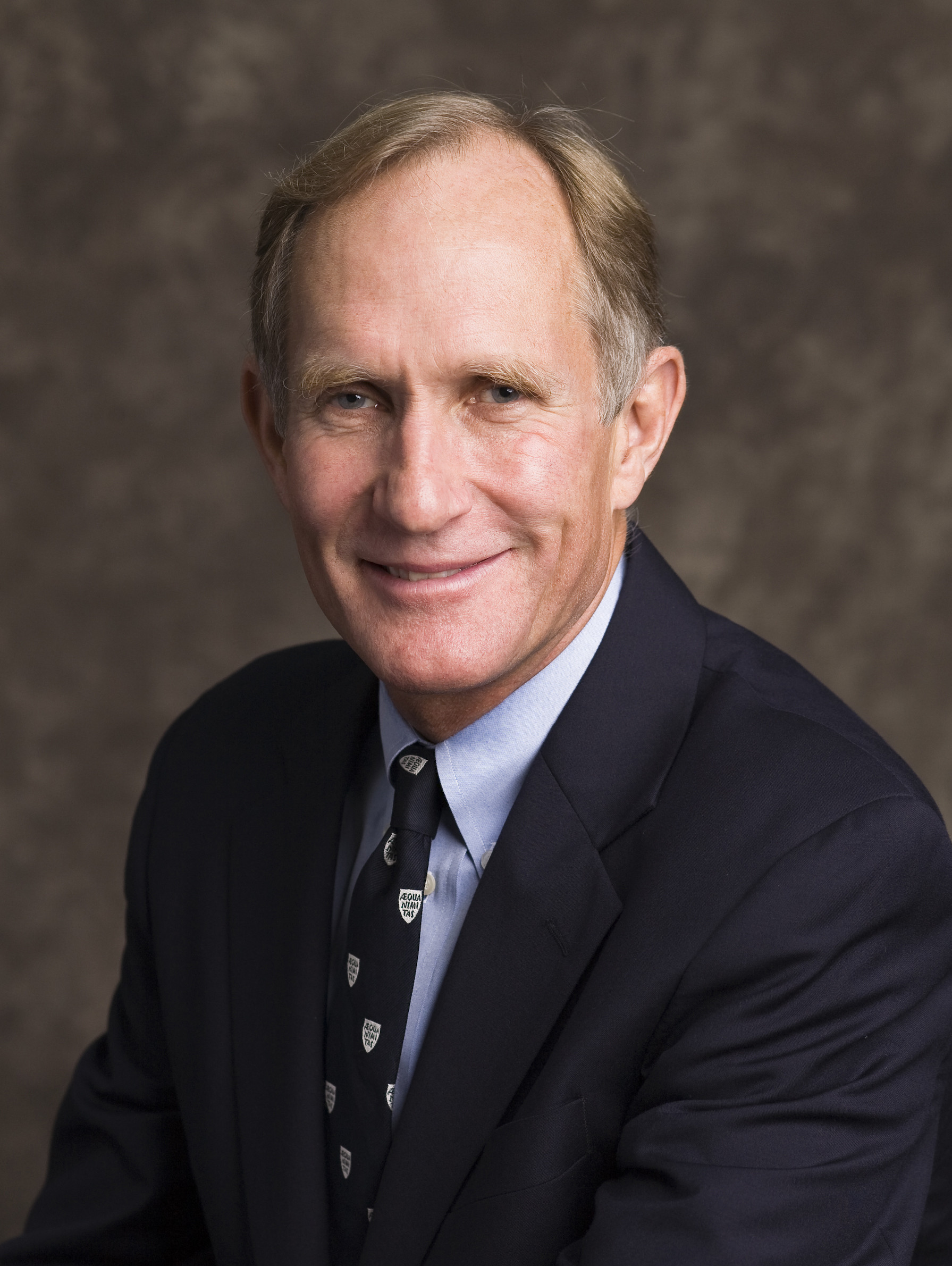
- Agre in 2003
- Born: January 30, 1949 (age 77); Northfield, Minnesota, U.S.
- Education: Augsburg College (BA); Johns Hopkins University (MD)
- Known for: Aquaporins
- Awards: Nobel Prize in Chemistry (2003) Bloomberg Distinguished Professorships (2014)
- Scientific career
- Fields: Medicine; Chemistry; Biochemistry
- Workplaces: Johns Hopkins Malaria Research Institute; Duke University; Case Western Reserve

Peter Courtland Agre (/ˈɑːɡriː/; born January 30, 1949) is a Nobel Laureate American physician, molecular biologist, Bloomberg Distinguished Professor at the Johns Hopkins Bloomberg School of Public Health and Johns Hopkins School of Medicine, and director emeritus of the Johns Hopkins Malaria Research Institute. In 2003, Agre and Roderick MacKinnon shared the 2003 Nobel Prize in Chemistry for "discoveries concerning channels in cell membranes." Agre was recognized for his discovery of aquaporin water channels. Aquaporins are water-channel proteins that move water molecules through the cell membrane. In 2009, Agre was elected president of the American Association for the Advancement of Science (AAAS) and became active in science diplomacy.

== Biography ==
Agre was born in Northfield, Minnesota and is the second of six children to parents of Norwegian and Swedish descent. Agre is a Lutheran. Fascinated by international travel after a high school camping trip through the Soviet Union, Agre was an inconsistent student until he developed an interest in science from his father who was a college chemistry professor.

Agre graduated from Roosevelt High School (Minnesota) before he received his B.A. in Chemistry from Augsburg University in Minneapolis and his M.D. in 1974 from the Johns Hopkins School of Medicine in Baltimore, Maryland. From 1975 to 1978, he completed his clinical training in Internal Medicine at Case Western Reserve University's Case Medical Center under Charles C.J. Carpenter. He subsequently did a Hematology-Oncology fellowship at North Carolina Memorial Hospital of UNC Chapel Hill. In 1981, Agre returned to the Johns Hopkins School of Medicine to join the lab of Vann Bennett in the Department of Cell Biology.

In 1984, Agre was recruited to the faculty of the Department of Medicine led by Victor A. McKusick. He subsequently joined the Department of Biological Chemistry led by Dan Lane. Agre rose to full professor in 1992 and remained at Johns Hopkins until 2005. From 2005 to 2007, Agre served as the Vice Chancellor for Science and Technology at Duke University Medical Center in Durham, North Carolina, where he guided the development of Duke's biomedical research. In 2008, he returned to Johns Hopkins, where he directs the Johns Hopkins Malaria Research Institute (JHMRI) in the Johns Hopkins Bloomberg School of Public Health and holds a joint appointment in the Johns Hopkins School of Medicine.

In 2004, Agre received the Golden Plate Award of the American Academy of Achievement. In February 2014, he was named a Bloomberg Distinguished Professor at Johns Hopkins University for his accomplishments as an interdisciplinary researcher and excellence in teaching the next generation of scholars. The Bloomberg Distinguished Professorships were established in 2013 by a gift from Michael Bloomberg.

=== Personal life ===
Agre and his wife, Mary, have been married since 1975. They have three daughters, one son, and two young granddaughters. Agre is an Eagle Scout and recipient of the Distinguished Eagle Scout Award (DESA). Two of his brothers, also physicians, and his son Clarke, a public defender, are also Eagle Scouts. Agre enjoys wilderness canoeing in the arctic and cross-country skiing, having completed the 60 mile Vasaloppet ski race in Sweden five times. Diagnosed with Parkinson's disease in 2012, Agre has had to reduce his activities.

"I identify more with Huckleberry Finn than with Albert Einstein," he told Scouting magazine.

Agre is known among science students for his humanity and humility. He appeared on The Colbert Report, discussing his role as a founding member of Scientists and Engineers for America (SEA), sound science in politics, and the decline of American knowledge of science, among other topics.

== Awards and recognition ==
In addition to the 2003 Nobel Prize in Chemistry, Agre was elected to membership in the National Academy of Sciences in 2000, the American Academy of Arts and Sciences in 2003, the American Philosophical Society in 2004, the National Academy of Medicine in 2005, and the American Society for Microbiology in 2011. Agre has received 19 honorary doctorates from universities around the world, including Japan, Norway, Greece, Mexico, Hungary, and the United States.

== Biomedical research ==
As a Johns Hopkins medical student in the early 1970s, Agre worked in the labs of Brad Sack and Pedro Cuatrecasas where he investigated the enterotoxin-induced diarrhea that caused dehydration and death of small children in developing countries. After clinical training, Agre joined Vann Bennett's lab in the Cell Biology Department at Johns Hopkins where he studied red cell membranes and identified spectrin deficiency as a common cause of hereditary spherocytosis, a hemolytic anemia with fragile, spherically shaped red cells. In 1984, Agre joined the Department of Medicine, where he built his own research program and first isolated the 32 kilodalton core subunit of the Rhesus blood group antigen, RhD.

=== Aquaporins ===
While studying RhD, Agre's team serendipitously discovered a 28 kilodalton red cell membrane protein. Also abundant in kidney tubules, the 28 kDa protein was related to proteins from diverse origins, including fruit fly brain, mammalian lens, bacteria, and plants. Since the function was unknown, Agre consulted John C. Parker, his former hematology professor at the University of North Carolina, who suggested that the protein may be the long-sought water channel responsible for rapid movements of water across the membranes of red cells and certain other cell types.

Teaming up with William Guggino at the Department of Physiology at Johns Hopkins, Agre's postdoctoral fellow Gregory Preston confirmed water channel function by expressing the cRNA in Xenopus laevis oocytes (frog eggs) that then became osmotically active and exploded in fresh water. The 28 kDa protein is now known as aquaporin-1 (abbreviated AQP1), the archetypal member of a large family of water channel proteins. Aquaporins are "the plumbing system for cells," said Agre. Every cell is primarily water. "But the water doesn't just sit in the cell, it moves through it in a very organized way. The process occurs rapidly in tissues that have these aquaporins or water channels." For 100 years, scientists assumed that water leaked through the cell membrane, and some water does. "But the very rapid movement of water through some cells was not explained by this theory," said Agre.

Agre's team and others identified paralogs in different tissues, and twelve aquaporins exist in humans. Permeated by water, aquaporins are required for generation of cerebrospinal fluid, aqueous humour, tears, sweat, saliva, humidification of airways, and renal concentration. Defects include cerebral edema, dry eye, anhydrosis, dehydration and water retention. Permeated by water plus glycerol, aquaglyceroporins confer glycerol uptake to the basal level of skin, glycerol release from fat during fasting, and glycerol uptake by liver where it is converted to glucose. Aquaporins and aquaglyceroporins exist in all life forms including invertebrates, plants, microbes, archaea, and parasites including the plasmodia that cause malaria.

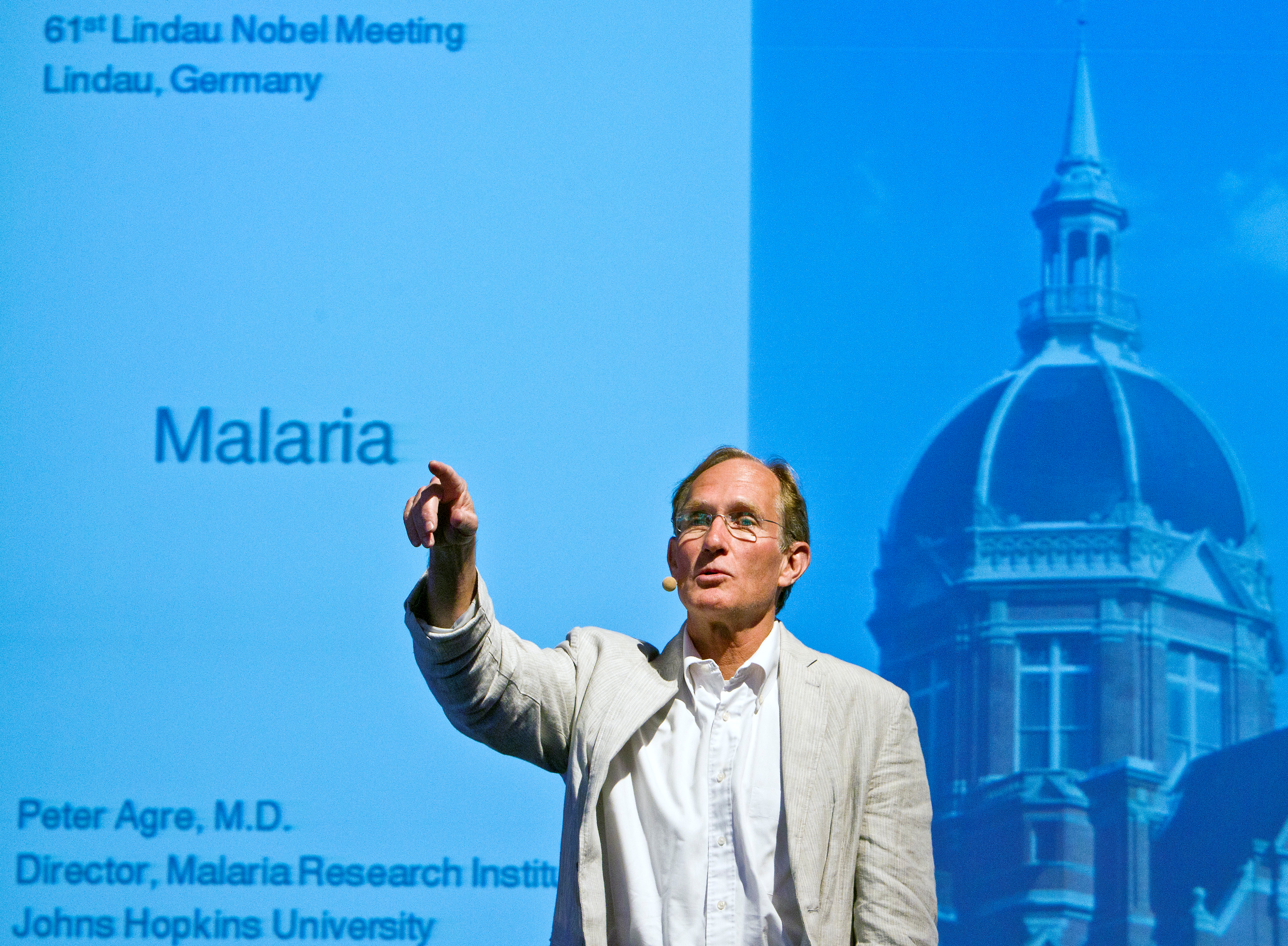
Peter Agre lecturing on malaria at the 61st Lindau Nobel Laureate Meeting in Lindau, Germany

=== 2003 Nobel Prize in Chemistry ===
In October 2003, it was announced that the Nobel Prize in Chemistry would go to two medical doctors, Peter Agre and Roderick MacKinnon, "for discoveries concerning channels in cell membranes." Credited for discovery of the aquaporin water channels, Agre was in bed at 5:30 am when the call came from Stockholm. Upon learning the news later, his mother responded, "That's very nice but don't let it go to his head." MacKinnon, credited with solving the structure and selectivity of potassium channels, was traveling back from a weekend fishing trip and only learned the news from colleagues.

=== Malaria ===
Long interested in diseases of the developing world, Agre and his team investigated aquaporins in malaria parasites, malaria mosquitoes, and cerebral malaria. In 2008, Agre became Director of the Johns Hopkins Malaria Research Institute (JHMRI) at the Bloomberg School of Public Health. Launched in 2001 by a gift from Michael Bloomberg and the Bloomberg Philanthropies, JHMRI includes 20 faculty members whose lab efforts include development of mosquitoes resistant to malaria transmission, design of novel malaria vaccines, biological studies of potential malaria drug targets and search for novel anti-malarial medicines.

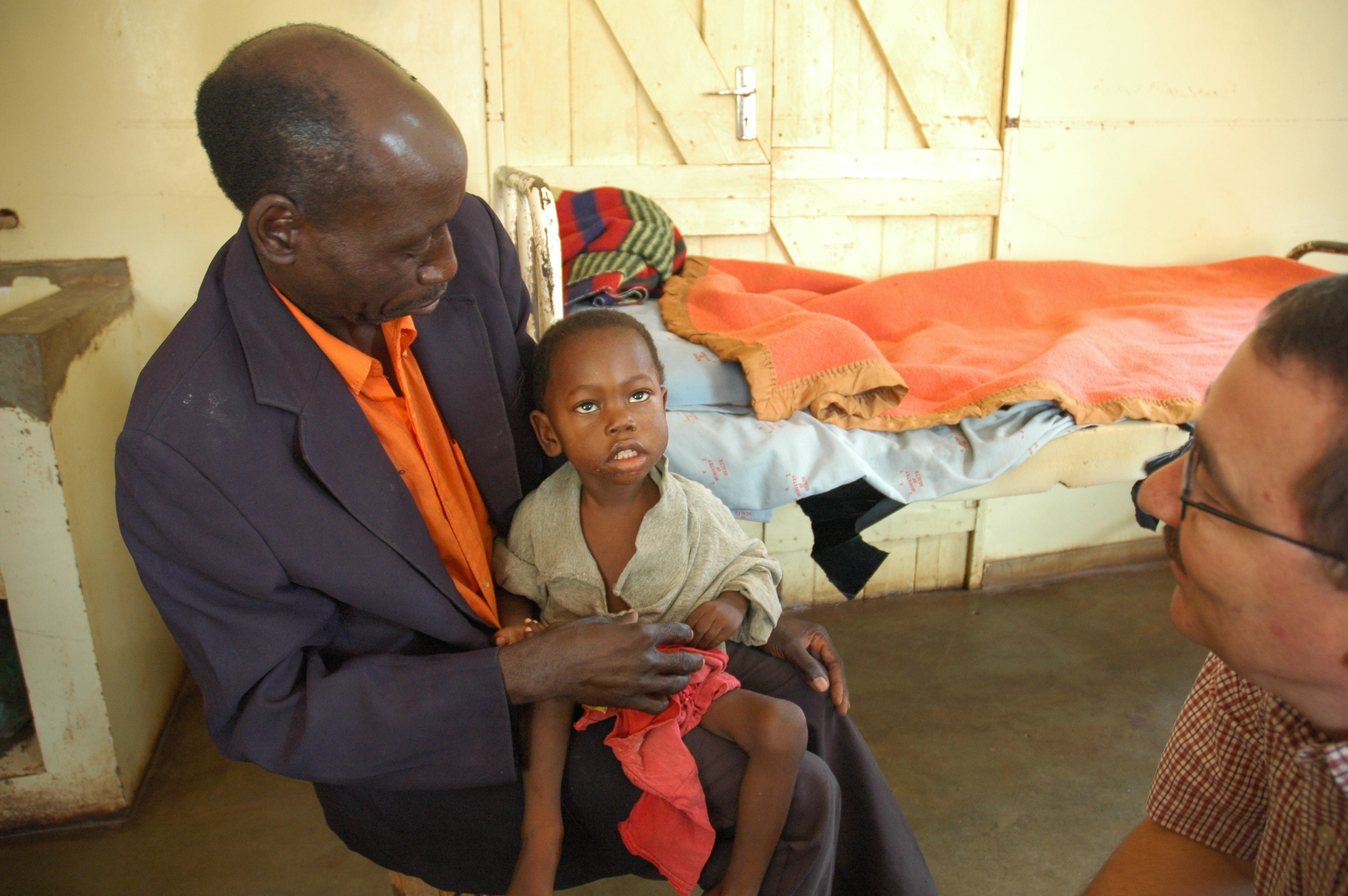
A Zambian villager holding his grandson whose life was saved by Dr. Philip Thuma. Afflicted with cerebral malaria, the child was near death but was left with permanent blindness.

Fieldwork in rural Africa is central to the JHMRI mission. A long-term partnership was initiated in 2003 with Macha Research Trust, a faith-based research program led by Dr. Philip Thuma that is affiliated with a former mission hospital in rural southern Zambia. With resources from JHMRI, a small modern research campus was constructed where African scientists and visiting scientists from Johns Hopkins are studying malaria drug resistance, mosquito insecticide resistance, and rates of malaria transmission. Since introduction of artemisinin combination therapy in 2003 and distribution of insecticide treated bed nets in 2007, the burden of malaria in small children has declined in Macha by 96%.

Receipt of an International Center of Excellence in Malaria Research Award (ICEMR) from the US National Institutes of Health in 2010 allowed expansion of the JHMRI program in Africa. New field sites were organized in partnership with African agencies in northern Zambia and southeastern Democratic Republic of Congo, where malaria control has failed, and in eastern Zimbabwe at the border of Mozambique, where malaria has become resurgent.

== Science diplomacy ==
While serving from 2009 to 2011 as president and chair of the board of advisors of the American Association for the Advancement of Science, Agre became very active in the AAAS Center for Science Diplomacy. Working with AAAS Chief International Officer, Vaughan Turekian, and former Scientific Advisor to the U.S. Secretary of State, Norman P. Neureiter, Agre led a series of science diplomacy visits to countries with adversarial relationships to the U.S. The objective of each trip was to foster exchanges and collaborations on peaceful scientific projects and thereby reduce tensions.

=== Cuba ===
The governments of Cuba and the US have maintained a hostile relationship made worse by the embargo that prevented the import of essential goods, equipment and even medicines. The inauguration of Barack Obama in 2009 led to a liberalized interpretation of restrictions by the U.S. government allowing scientific and cultural exchanges between the two countries.

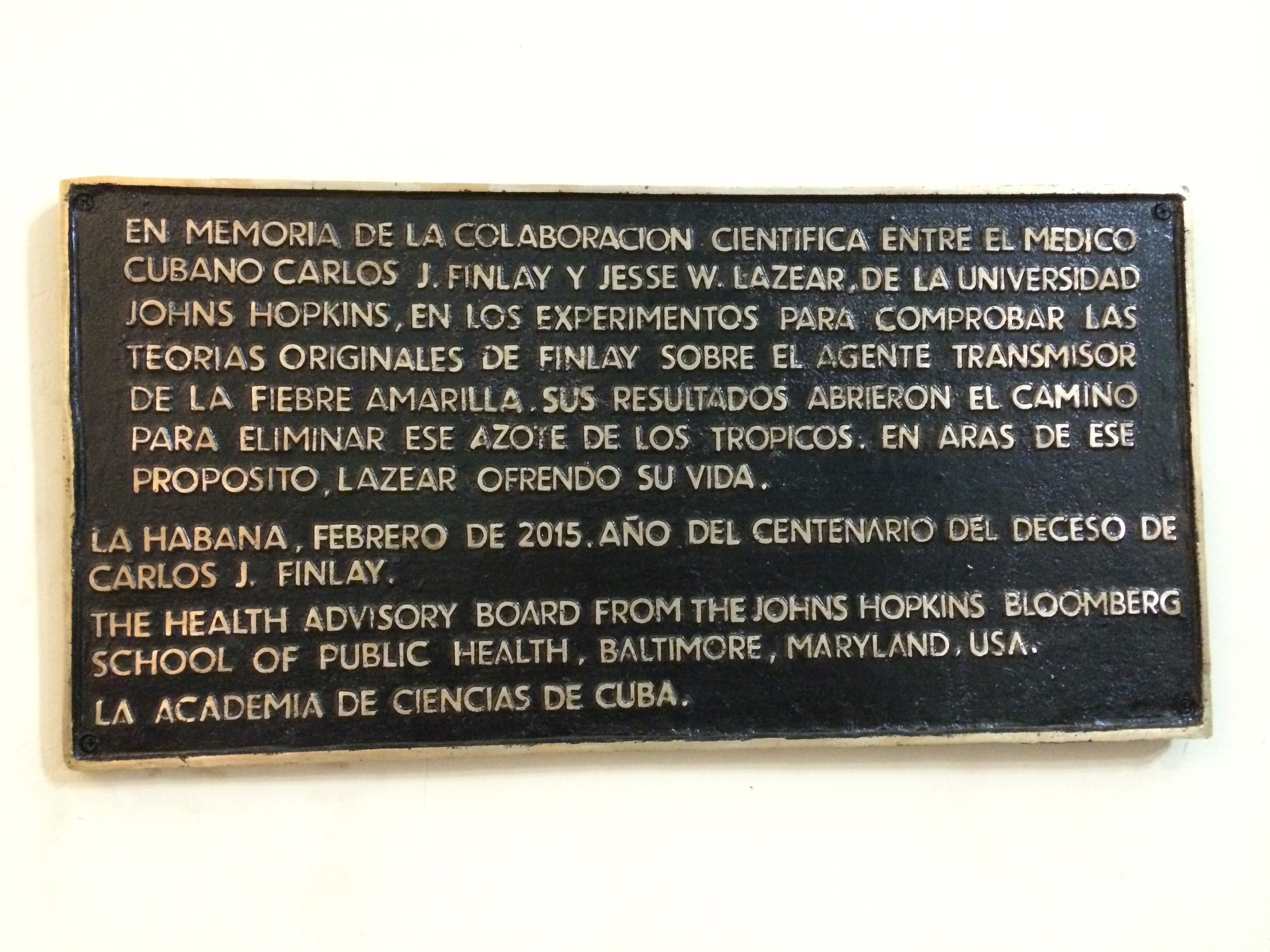
Plaque commemorating the collaboration of Cuban scientist Carlos Finlay and Johns Hopkins scientist Jesse Lazear in the Cuban Academy of Sciences by the Johns Hopkins Bloomberg School of Public Health Advisory Board visit to Havana in February 2015

In November 2009, Agre made the first of six trips to Cuba when he led a group of scientists from AAAS to Havana. Two years later, Agre led an extensive series of visits to the Cuban Academy of Sciences and leading Cuban scientific institutions including the institutes for biotechnology, pharmaceutical and vaccine development, a teaching hospital and ELAM (Latin American School of Medicine) Cuba. Invited to lecture at the University of Havana, Agre also met with Fidel Castro who discussed numerous topics including the need for universal health care as one cause for the Cuban Revolution. Agre subsequently led another AAAS visit and served as Honorary President of Biotecnologia Habana 2012 and Plenary Lecturer at Quimcuba 2015.

Despite animosities, Cuba and the U.S. have had a long tradition of scientific interactions that dated from 1900. The outbreak of Yellow Fever at the time of the Spanish–American War resulted in the Yellow Fever Commission led by US Army Major Walter Reed. Working together, Cuban medical scientist, Carlos Finlay, and a young Johns Hopkins faculty member, Jesse William Lazear, proved for the first time that yellow fever was transmitted by mosquitoes. In a fateful experiment, Lazear allowed himself to be bitten by mosquitoes that had fed upon yellow fever patients, and he died of the disease. This discovery led to conquest of Yellow Fever. Cuba always felt that Finlay and Lazear never received proper credit, an issue partially ameliorated by the 2015 visit by the Johns Hopkins Health Advisory Board and plaque unveiling.

=== Democratic People's Republic of Korea (North Korea) ===
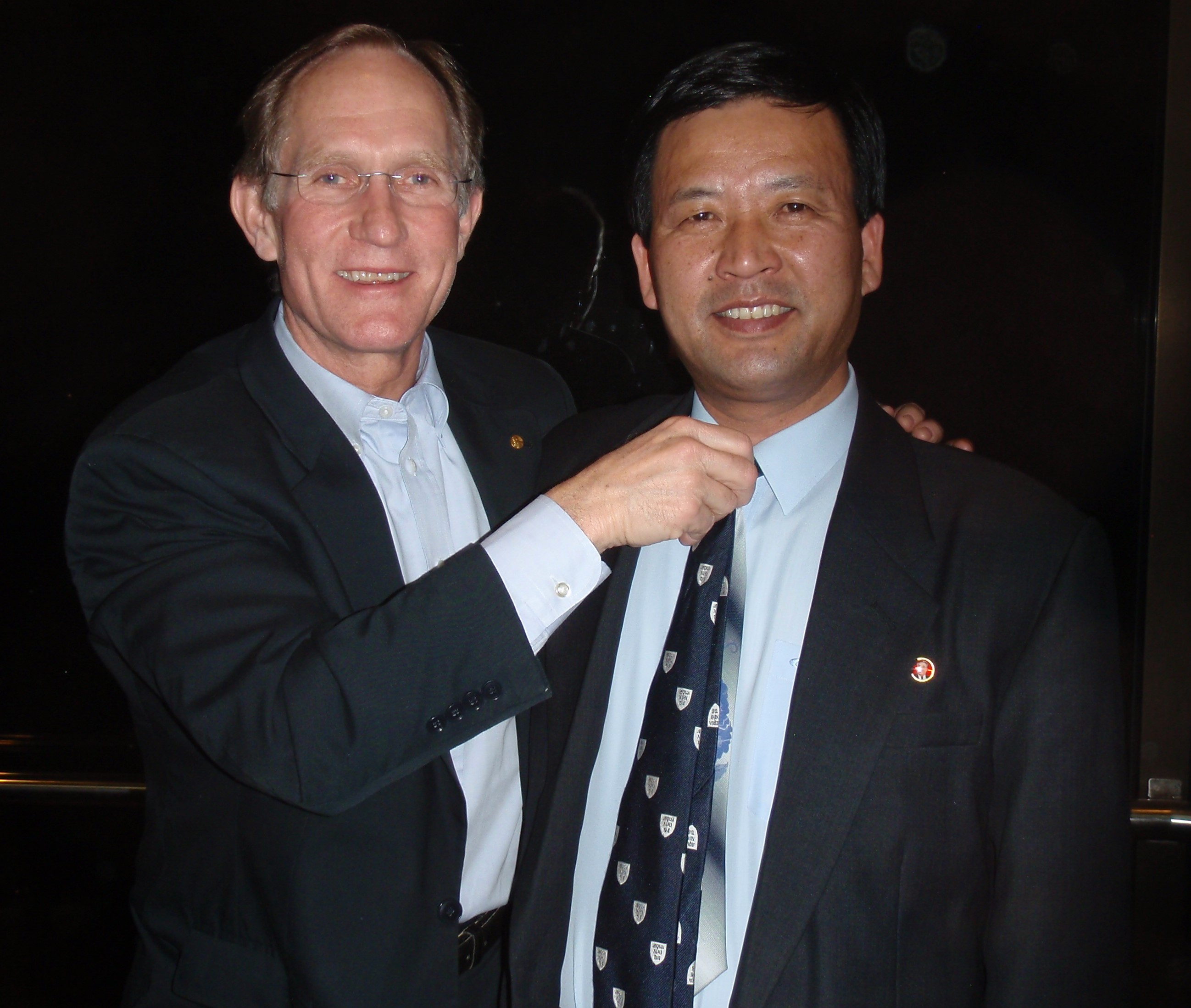
Peter Agre in 2009 presenting his Johns Hopkins necktie to the Vice President of the DPRK State Academy of Science. The tie worn by Agre during his 2003 Nobel lecture in Stockholm is to be presented to the first DPRK scientist who wins a Nobel Prize.

Referred to as the "Hermit Kingdom," the DPRK has been nearly totally isolated from the world since the negotiated ceasefire in 1953. Requests for entry by US organizations were rebuffed. Working through the DPRK Ambassador to the UN, an invitation was issued to the Nobel Laureate-led AAAS team in partnership with CRDF Global for a visit hosted by the DPRK State Academy of Sciences in December 2009. Avoiding issues related to weapons development, requests to visit 15 research institutes, universities, the Grand People's Study House, and a hospital were all granted. In most cases, the leadership of these institutions had never seen or met an American previously. Potential future scientific collaboration in the life sciences such as medicine development and agricultural research received extensive and enthusiastic discussion. A follow-up visits by DPRK scientific leadership to the AAAS – CRDF team occurred 15 months later at the Carter Center in Atlanta.

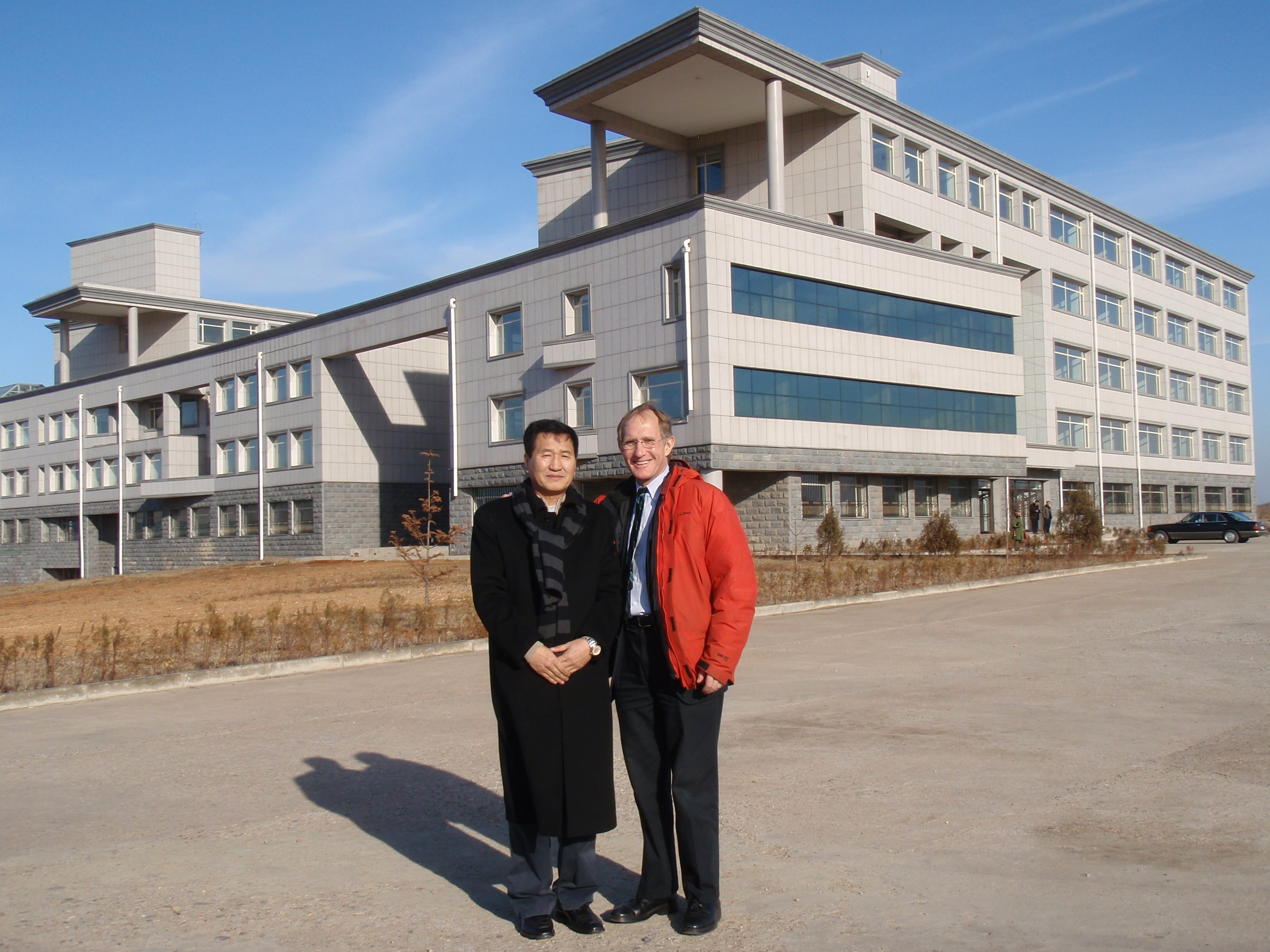
Peter Agre visiting the Pyongyang University of Science and Technology in 2009

A meeting occurred with the leadership of the Pyongyang University of Science and Technology (PUST), a private university founded by a Korean-born American businessman. The only English language university in DPRK, PUST draws outstanding undergraduate and graduate students from DPRK and volunteer faculty from abroad. Opening in 2010, PUST is the only campus where westerners can mingle with students in DPRK. Agre provided keynote plenary lectures to the first International Science Symposium at PUST in 2011 and the third symposium in 2015. Invited to participate in a tour of multiple DPRK universities by four Nobel Laureates in 2016, Agre was unable to attend due to a hospitalization. It would have been his fourth trip to the country.

=== Myanmar (Burma) ===
A visit by Agre and the AAAS Science Diplomacy team to Myanmar occurred in April 2010. Travel was made to the new capital, Naypyidaw, for formal meetings with the Ministry of Forestry and Ministry of Health to discuss malaria. A meeting with faculty of University of Yangon was also held. Despite continued existence of the junta, an impending transition was evident, as meetings with the opposition were arranged in Yangon. Although Aung San Suu Kyi was unavailable as she was still under house arrest, her release occurred six months later, and Myanmar has made solid progress towards liberal democracy.

=== Iran (Islamic Republic of Iran) ===
Meetings with Iranian Foreign Minister Ali Akbar Salehi at the New York residence of the Iranian Ambassador to the UN resulted in a June 2012 visit to Tehran by Agre and Norman P. Neureiter. Salehi, a PhD graduate of MIT and former head of the Atomic Energy Organization of Iran, arranged for lectures in multiple universities in Tehran where Agre was appointed visiting professor at the Sharif University of Technology and a private meeting was held with President Mahmoud Ahmadinejad.

== Political activism ==
=== Thomas Butler Case ===
As Chairman of the Committee on Human Rights of the National Academies of Sciences, Engineering, and Medicine, Agre led a group of prominent scientists that defended Thomas C. Butler, an infectious disease researcher from Texas Tech University who in January 2003 voluntarily reported to the university safety office that 30 vials of plague bacteria were missing and had probably been autoclaved or incinerated. Although Butler cooperated with FBI agents, he was accused of lying and was arrested. When he refused to plead guilty, federal prosecutors charged Butler with many confusing charges concerning grant accounting and sample shipping. Despite support from Agre and other scientists, Butler was convicted in a jury trial, lost his medical license, and served 2 years in prison. Occurring at a time of large national fear following the 9/11 attacks, the incident has been seen by some as an overreaction by the FBI due to public fear of bioterrorism.

=== 2008 Minnesota U.S. Senate race ===
In the spring of 2007, Agre announced that he would explore the US Senate race in his home state of Minnesota being contested by two residents originally from New York – incumbent Sen. Norm Coleman and challenger comedian Al Franken. Agre emphasized health care and environmental issues rather than the Iraq war. He said, "The issues that were important to us at the millennium are still important today." He also felt that the US Senate would benefit from the perspective of a medical scientist.

Despite polls indicating that he could win, Agre announced in August 2007 that he would not enter the race for the Minnesota Senate seat, calculating the huge personal cost and the termination of his federally funded scientific research program and humanitarian service. An advocate for increased representation of science in government, he would not rule out the possibility of seeking public office in the future.

Although Barack Obama carried Minnesota by a landslide, the senate election was a statistical tie resulting in a recount and six months of legal fights before the Minnesota Supreme Court awarded Al Franken the victory by only 312 votes out of 2.9 million ballots cast. The outcome was important as Franken was sworn in as Senator in July 2009 and provided the 60th vote necessary to end debate on the Affordable Care Act.

=== Other activism ===
In addition to being a founding member of Scientists and Engineers for Change, Agre was one of 48 Nobel laureates who signed a letter endorsing Massachusetts Sen. John Kerry for president. Agre criticized many policies of the Bush administration.

He has said that he admired Linus Pauling, another Nobel laureate and peace activist.

Agre served on the transition team for Barack Obama's 2008 presidential campaign, helping forge science policy and answers to scientific policy questions posed by Science Debate 2008.

In 2015, Agre signed the Mainau Declaration 2015 on Climate Change on the final day of the 65th Lindau Nobel Laureate Meeting. The declaration was signed by a total of 76 Nobel Laureates and handed to then-President of the French Republic, François Hollande, as part of the successful COP21 climate summit in Paris.

In 2026 he would endorse Emma Lewisham's skincare brand for its sustainability and scientific methods.

== See also ==
- Roderick MacKinnon
- Gheorghe Benga
