= Scientists and Engineers for America =

Professional advocacy organization

- Formation: September 27, 2006
- Type: 501(c)(3) Nonprofit Advocacy Group
- Headquarters: Washington, D.C.
- Location: United States
- Members: 7,100
- Official language: English
- Website: SHARP.SEforA.org (inactive)

Scientists and Engineers for America (SEA) was an organization focused on promoting sound science in American government, and supporting candidates who understand science and its applications. SEA was formed on September 27, 2006, and describes itself as non-partisan.

SEA is organized as a 501(c)(3) organization, and represents a reorganization of Scientists and Engineers for Change, an organization founded in 2004 to support the election of John Kerry. Its current executive director is Tom Price. SEA operates a wiki site called the Science, Health And Related Policies (SHARP) Network, which allows members to track and contribute information on Congressional representatives, candidates, and science policy issues. SEA is associated with a 501(c)(4) organization known as the SEA Action Fund, whose president is geneticist Michael Stebbins.

== Political positions ==
=== Bill of Rights for Scientists and Engineers ===
A bill of rights which outlines the principles of the organization states:

# Public policy shall be made using the best available scientific, technical, and engineering knowledge.

1. No government organization shall knowingly distribute false or misleading information.
2. Government funding for science, technology, engineering, and mathematics (STEM) education shall only be used for evidence-based curricula.
3. No one should fear reprisals or intimidation because of the results of his or her research.
4. Scientists, technologists, and engineers conducting research or analysis with public funding shall be free of unreasonable restrictions in discussing and publishing their work, and the results of governmentally-funded research and analysis shall be made open to the public without unreasonable delay.
5. A clear, public, and transparent process shall be used to make decisions about restricting public access to information for reasons of national security. There shall be a process for challenging decisions, and remedial measures to correct mistakes and abuses of the classification system.
6. Employees exposing what they believe to be manipulation of research and analysis for political or ideological reasons shall be protected from intimidation, retribution, or adverse personnel action resulting from the decision to speak out.
7. Appointments to publicly funded advisory committees shall be based on professional and academic qualifications, not political affiliation or ideology.

=== Mission statement ===
The organization's mission statement states:

We envision a future where wise science and technology policy can help every American live in a safe and clean environment, enjoy good health and education, and benefit from a strong system of national defense. Scientists and Engineers for America is the only national organization dedicated exclusively to advancing these goals through the electoral process.

SEA works to promote evidence-based decision making in politics and at all levels of government by:

- Raising the level of debate on science and policy in elections and beyond;
- Encouraging people with training in science and engineering to run for office;
- Facilitating the participation of scientists and engineers in politics and civic life; and
- Providing timely information on the science policy positions of elected officials and candidates for elected office.

SEA is a nonprofit, nonpartisan, educational organization exempt from taxation under section 501(c)(3) of the Internal Revenue Code.

== Programs ==
=== SHARP Network ===
The Science, Health and Related Policies Network is a wiki to track congressional representatives, senators, and candidates as well as presidential candidates.

=== Innovation & the Elections 2008 ===
Scientists and Engineers for America organized a coalition of 19 science organizations to submit a set of 7 questions to all the candidates for United States Congress. The coalition includes groups such as the American Association for the Advancement of Science, National Academy of Sciences, and Science Debate 2008.

=== Campaign Education and Training ===
The Campaign Education and Training project is a workshop aimed at training science-oriented professionals to run for public office. Along with the workshop, SEA also hosts an online advice column called Campaign Lab for scientists to ask political experts on different aspects of running for political office.

=== SEA chapters ===
SEA chapters provide a way for students and members of the scientific community to influence the interface between science and politics. These chapters develop the means for both current and future scientists and engineers to influence the policy arena and expand the forum through which SEA involves scientists and engineers in the political and civic process.

== Board of Advisers ==
Among others, the SEA Board of Advisers includes noted Nobel Laureates such as:

- Peter Agre
- Sidney Altman
- Philip W. Anderson
- Johann Deisenhofer
- Alfred Gilman
- Douglas D. Osheroff
- Martin Perl
- Burton Richter
- Harold E. Varmus

== Criticism ==
Soon after its foundation, the organization was accused of partisanship by several conservative media outlets. An editorial in The Wall Street Journal criticised the organization for seeming to stifle scientific dissent:

That is one reason why it is always dismaying when scientists -- of all people -- suggest that on some subjects there must be no questioning because debate is closed. And on one level, at least, this would seem to be the implicit message of the newly formed 527 political organization called Scientists and Engineers for America, or SEA.

In a rebuttal posted on the SEA website, founding executive director Michael Brown stated:

Nothing could be further from the truth. As one who is familiar with SEA and its mission, I must confess that I had to read the editorial three or four times before I had any idea what it was talking about. In fact, it was not until I re-read the Weekly Standard article that I understood the "debate" we were allegedly closing. This is the debate about whether scientists and engineers should engage in public policy and actively address the misuse and politicization of science or whether they should remain silent when their voices are censured, their findings are misused, and scientific integrity itself is attacked. This is a debate that is open, ongoing---and that we join with enthusiasm.

== See also ==
- Politicization of science
- Scientific Integrity in Policymaking
- Union of Concerned Scientists
- Federation of American Scientists
