= Johann Deisenhofer =

German biochemist

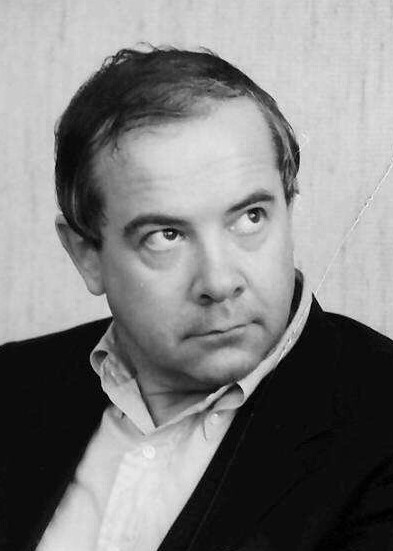
- Born: September 30, 1943 (age 83); Zusamaltheim, Germany
- Citizenship: Germany and United States
- Education: Technical University of Munich; Max Planck Institute for Biochemistry
- Known for: Crystallography; Photosynthesis
- Awards: Max Delbruck Prize (1986); Golden Plate Award of the American Academy of Achievement (1989); Nobel Prize for Chemistry) (1988)
- Scientific career
- Fields: Biophysics and biochemistry
- Workplaces: University of Texas Southwestern Medical Center
- Doctoral advisor: Robert Huber
- Website: www.utsouthwestern.edu/labs/deisenhofer

Johann Deisenhofer (German pronunciation: [ˈjoːhan ˈdaɪzn̩ˌhoːfɐ]; born September 30, 1943) is a German biochemist who, along with Hartmut Michel and Robert Huber, received the Nobel Prize for Chemistry in 1988 for their determination of the first crystal structure of an integral membrane protein, a membrane-bound complex of proteins and co-factors that is essential to photosynthesis.

== Early life and education ==
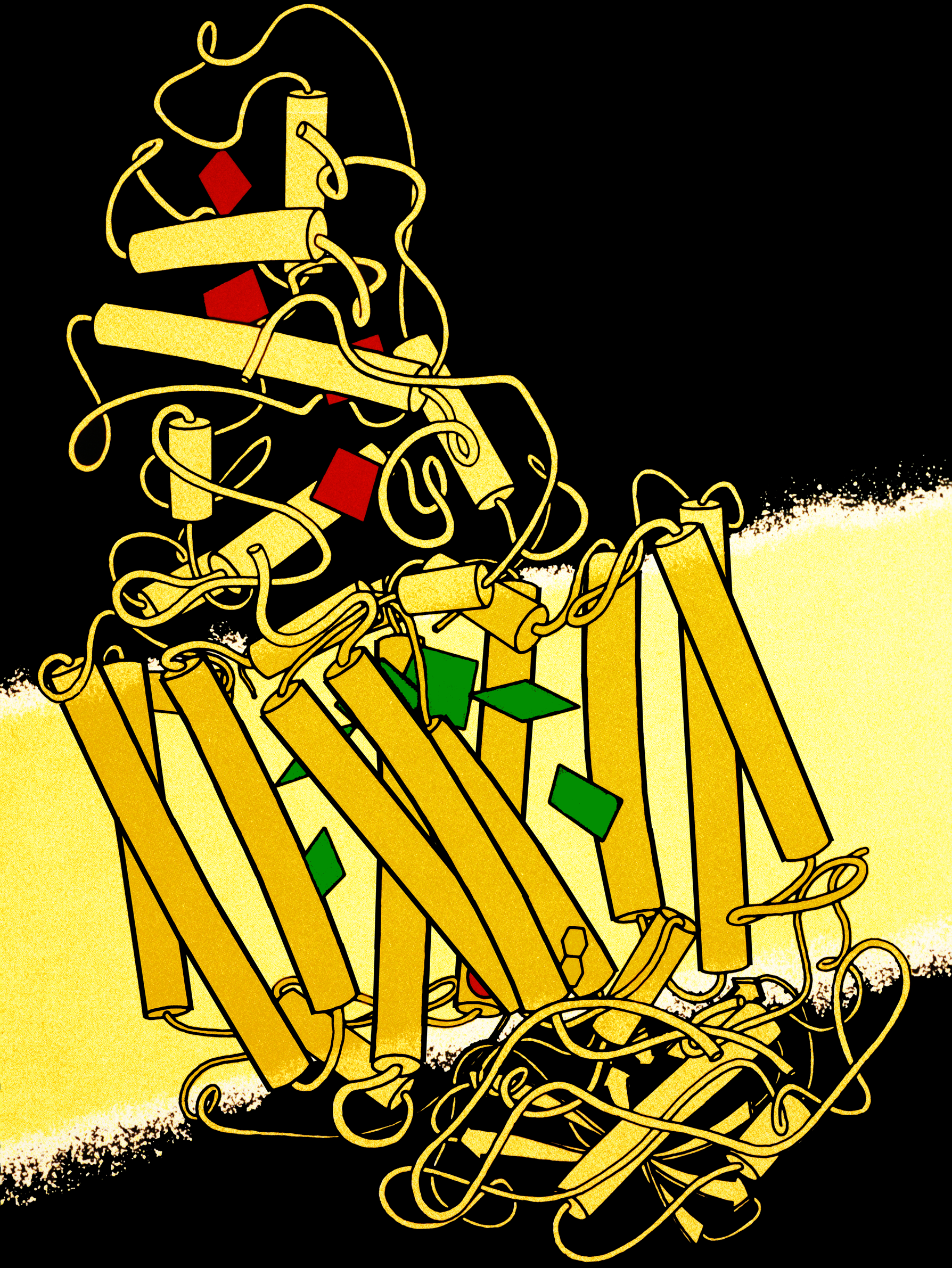
Schematic of photosynthetic reaction center structure in membrane.

Born in Bavaria, Deisenhofer earned his doctorate from the Technical University of Munich for research work done at the Max Planck Institute of Biochemistry in Martinsried, West Germany, in 1974. He conducted research there until 1988, when he joined the scientific staff of the Howard Hughes Medical Institute and the faculty of the Department of Biochemistry at The University of Texas Southwestern Medical Center at Dallas.

== Career ==
Together with Michel and Huber, Deisenhofer determined the three-dimensional structure of a protein complex found in certain photosynthetic bacteria. This membrane protein complex, called a photosynthetic reaction center, was known to play a crucial role in initiating a simple type of photosynthesis. Between 1982 and 1985, the three scientists used X-ray crystallography to determine the exact arrangement of the more than 10,000 atoms that make up the protein complex. Their research increased the general understanding of the mechanisms of photosynthesis and revealed similarities between the photosynthetic processes of plants and bacteria.

Deisenhofer currently serves on the board of advisors of Scientists and Engineers for America, an organization focused on promoting sound science in American government. In 2003 he was one of 22 Nobel Laureates who signed the Humanist Manifesto. He is currently a professor at the Department of Biophysics at the University of Texas Southwestern Medical Center.
