= The War on Science =

2016 book by Shawn Lawrence Otto

- Author: Shawn Lawrence Otto
- Language: English
- Subject: Philosophy of science
- Genre: Non-fiction
- Publisher: Milkweed Editions
- Publication date: 17 May 2016
- Publication place: United States
- Awards: Minnesota Book Award for General Nonfiction
- ISBN: 978-1571313539
- Website: milkweed.org/book/the-war-on-science

The War on Science: Who's Waging It, Why It Matters, What We Can Do About It is a 2016 book by science advocate Shawn Lawrence Otto with a foreword by Lawrence Krauss about denialism. It won the Minnesota Book Award for General Nonfiction.

== Synopsis ==
The book is divided into four parts: The first part is an introduction, the second part relates science to politics (and nature and society in general), the third part also looks at related actors that engage in denialism, and the fourth part lists recommendations as to how denialism may be countered.

=== Part I ===
Otto argues that religiously fundamentalist groups act antithetically to modern science, contrasting that with the pro-scientific beliefs of Thomas Jefferson. It argues in favour of the scientific method and peer review, but stresses that scientific discovery may contradict established dogma.

=== Part II ===
Otto goes on to relate science to politics, describing the history of an intertwinedness of the two, ie. how they might influence each other and have done so in the past. He also claims that mathematicians tend to be brilliant musicians. He analyses not only the effects of science on politics, but also on nature and society in general. He notably argues against a notion of "balance" according to which unscientific and scientifically accurate information should be given the same media attention. In this context, he worries that economical incentives may dissuade journalists from what he describes as attainable objectivity.

=== Part III ===
Otto refutes Academic skepticism and Post-structuralism and instead supports an Epicurean point of view. He critically analyses the arguments that Christian anti-scientists use, and also reviews the history and strategies of economical actors deceiving the public and attacking science with sinister motivations.

=== Part IV ===
In the last part, Otto not only argues in favour of reconciling economical growth with the need of keeping the environment intact, but also for defending scientific truths. He states that it is immoral (and should be called thus) to argue against these. He goes on to state a host of recommendations the implementation of which might counter denialism.

== Reception ==
The Guardian published a positive review, calling it a "must read". The Scientific American published a non-judgmental review, though it is noted that the range of facts, trends and history treated was "astonishingly broad". The Library Journal described it as overly long, but nonetheless "well-written" and "vital reading" for people especially interested in the role of science in a healthy democracy.
