= Cancer Wars =

1998 documentary

Cancer Wars is a six-part documentary that aired on PBS on May 25, 1998. The first episode discussed the history of cancer research such as contributions of epidemiologists at the University of Jena which were the first to document the link between cancer and smoking. The documentary discusses how US government tobacco interests prevented this evidence from coming to surface since tobacco was such an important US export. Cancer Wars delved into the pioneering work of Rachel Carson, whose book Silent Spring radically changed the world's thinking about chemicals and their effects on human health and the environment. Other episodes in this series discussed various topics ranging from the history of the advances in cancer therapy to the influence of Margaret Thatcher's neoliberal policies which cut funding to Anti-smoking campaigns in Britain because of interests in protecting British tobacco companies.

The documentary is based on Robert N. Proctor's 1995 book, Cancer Wars: How Politics Shapes What we Know and Don't Know About Cancer.

== Transmission ==
The series was first broadcast on 18 January 1998 on Channel 4 in the United Kingdom, in four parts.

== Episodes ==
No.	Title	Original release date
1	"Blind to Danger"	May 25, 1998
The series opens with the early post-war period when cancer seemed to pose no great threat and continues with the first warnings that smoking was to blame, President Nixon's 1971 declaration of "war on cancer" and the first cure. The episode also covers the recent discovery of Nazi archives that revealed their 1930's discovery of the link between cancer and smoking.
2	"Heroes and Villans"	June 1, 1998
The early optimism that science would find a cure gave way to a sober assessment of the problem, with regulators in government pointing the finger at industry, particularly asbestos, and warning of millions of deaths to come. Women started talking about breast cancer for the first time and Laetrile became, and has remained, a controversial drug to which thousands of desperate patients turn.
3	"Moving the Target"	June 8, 1998
The 1980s brought a backlash against regulation and the idea that nature played a larger role than man in causing cancer. It was the time of the cancer-causing "scare-a-day" that included coffee, apples, hairspray and other products, but smoking remained the major cause of cancer and alternative treatments became more popular.
4	"Living with the Enemy"	June 15, 1998
The last program of the series looks at some of the gains and setbacks of the 1990s. In mid-decade, the death rate from cancer began to decline. However, increased cigarette marketing in developing countries would surely mean increased lung cancer victims in the future.

== See also ==
- Agnotology
- Merchants of Doubt
