= Chris Mooney (journalist) =

American journalist and author

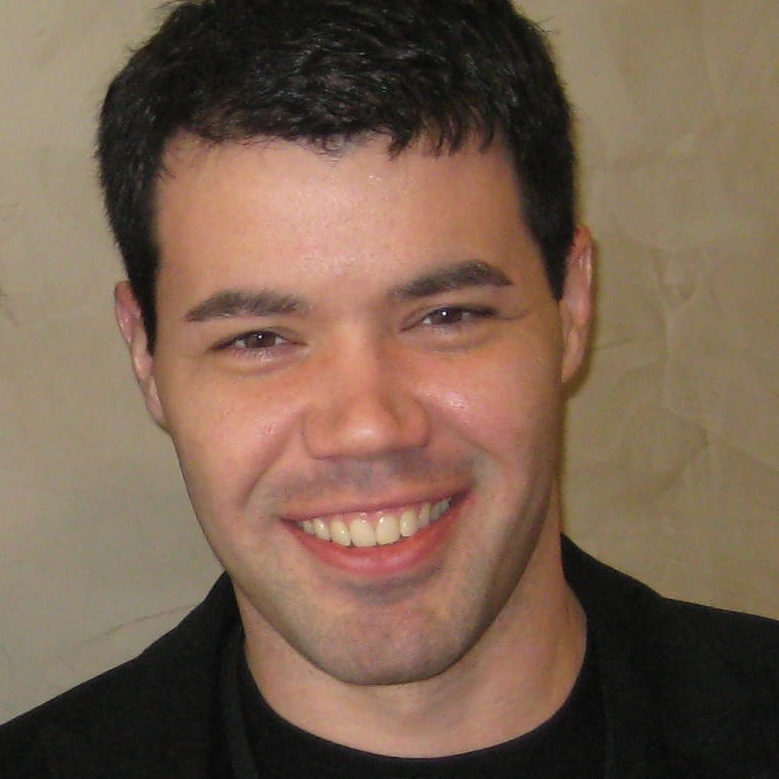
- Mooney in 2010
- Born: Christopher Cole Mooney; September 20, 1977 (age 49); Mesa, Arizona, U.S.
- Education: Yale University
- Occupations: Author, journalist
- Writing career
- Subjects: Science and politics
- Notable work: The Republican War on Science
- Website: ChrisMooney.com

Christopher Cole Mooney (born September 20, 1977) is an American journalist, professor at the University of Tennessee and author of four books including The Republican War on Science (2005). Mooney's writing focuses on subjects such as climate change denialism and creationism in public schools, and he has been described as "one of the few journalists in the country who specialize in the now dangerous intersection of science and politics." In 2020 he was awarded a Pulitzer Prize for a series of articles on global warming published in The Washington Post.

== Early life and education ==
Mooney was born in Mesa, Arizona, and grew up with two siblings in New Orleans, Louisiana. Both of his parents were college English professors. He attended Isidore Newman School before entering Yale University, where he graduated with a B.A. in English in 1999. His interest in the natural sciences was strongly influenced by his grandfather Gerald A. Cole, a professor at Arizona State University and author of Textbook of Limnology, a noted book in the field.

== Career ==
=== Journalism ===
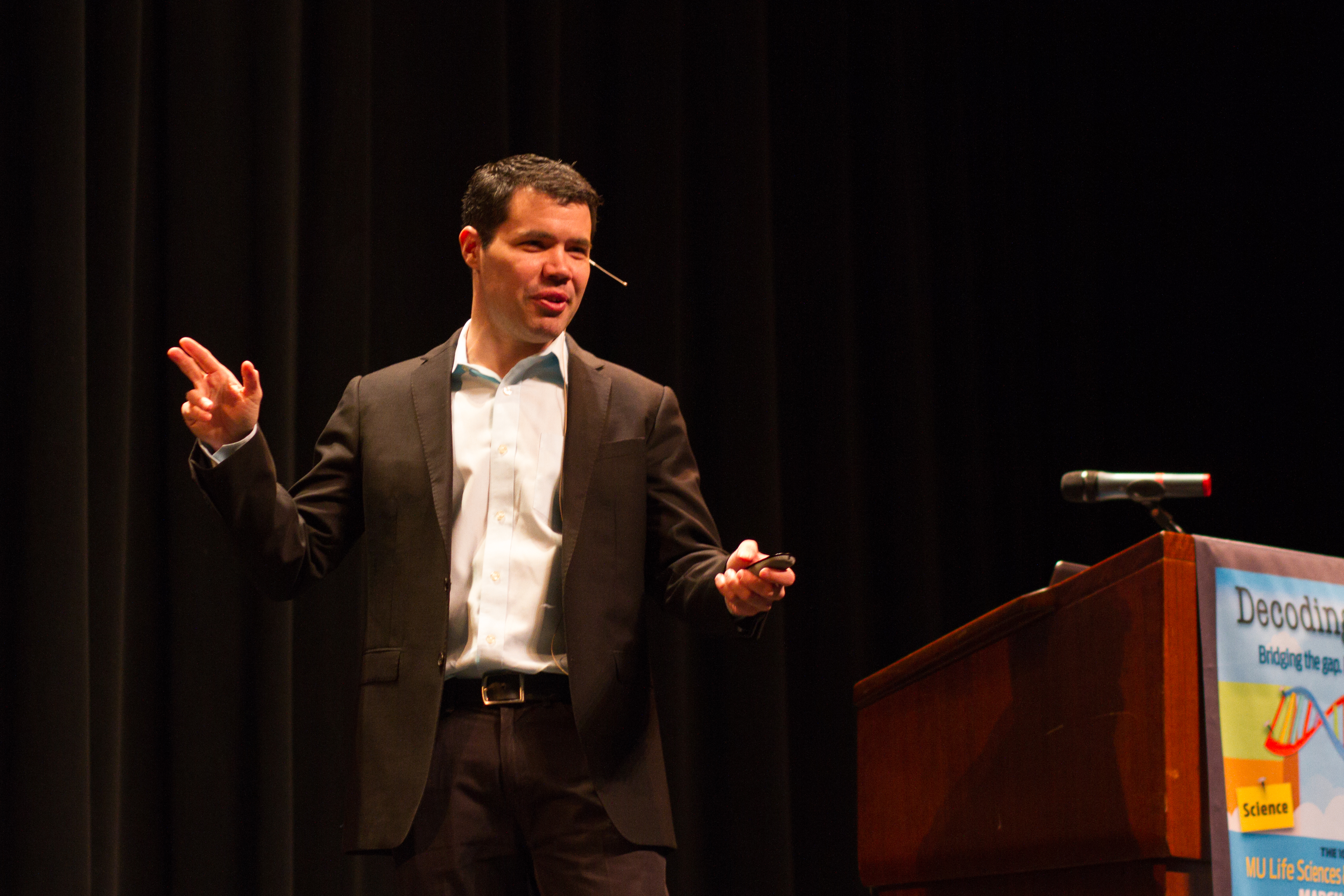
Chris Mooney at the University of Missouri in March 2014

Mooney helped establish Tapped, the group blog of American Prospect.

Mooney continued his freelance work contributing to Slate, Salon.com, Reason, The Washington Monthly, the Utne Reader, Columbia Journalism Review, The Washington Post, and The Boston Globe. Mooney maintained the column Doubt and About for the magazine Skeptical Inquirer, last contributing in 2006. Mooney started the blog The Intersection which ran on ScienceBlogs from 2006 to 2009, then at Discover Magazine until 2011, before moving to Science Progress in 2011. From 2007 until 2013 he contributed to DeSmogBlog, a blog that focuses on topics related to global warming. Mooney was then a correspondent for The Climate Desk magazine and for Mother Jones. In October 2014 the Washington Post announced that Mooney would begin writing a new, environmentally focused blog for the paper. In 2017, he was selected as a recipient of the SEAL Environmental Journalism Award for his environmental coverage. In 2018, he was one of four writers selected as a repeat recipient of the SEAL Environmental Journalism Award.

In 2005 Mooney's first book, The Republican War on Science, was released. The book explored the premise that the presidential administration of George W. Bush regularly distorted and/or suppressed scientific research to further its own political aims. The book became a New York Times Best Seller and landed Mooney interviews on popular television programs such as The Daily Show and The Colbert Report, as well as podcasts such as Point of Inquiry and Rationally Speaking. In 2012 a paper published in the American Sociological Review confirmed the book's thesis that conservatives in the United States have become increasingly distrustful of science. Mooney continued this line of inquiry into a fourth book published in 2012. The Republican Brain generated some controversy, with his argument compared to eugenics, and Mooney was on Up with Chris Hayes, Hardball with Chris Matthews, and Now with Alex Wagner.

=== Podcast host ===
From 2010 to 2013, Mooney served as one of the hosts of the Center for Inquiry podcast Point of Inquiry. In June 2013, due to disagreement with Center for Inquiry president Ronald Lindsay over his remarks at a conference focused on women in secularism, Mooney, co-host Indre Viskontas, and producer Adam Isaak announced their resignation from the Point of Inquiry podcast. Mooney, Viskontas, and Isaak started a new podcast at Mother Jones, titled Inquiring Minds, and the first episode of the new podcast was released in September 2013. On October 10, 2014, Mooney announced his departure from the Inquiring Minds podcast, in order to pursue a new assignment with the Washington Post.

=== Academics ===
In 2009, he joined the Center for Collaborative History at Princeton University for the Spring semester as a visiting associate. From 2009 to 2010, Mooney was a Knight Science Journalism Fellow at the Massachusetts Institute of Technology. In February 2010, Mooney was named a Templeton-Cambridge Journalism Fellow at the Templeton Foundation.

In 2024 he joined the University of Virginia’s Environmental Institute as a professor to teach courses on science communication.

=== Science communication and "Framing" ===
In 2007 Mooney and co-author Matthew Nisbet wrote a paper for Science on the topic of "Framing Science". They advocated that scientists and science communicators tailor their messages to account for how the general public filters information based on pre-existing beliefs. Practical examples of this filtering include the impact of fundamental religious beliefs on the topic of creationism and conservative political beliefs on the topic of climate change denialism. Mooney and Nesbit called out atheist activist and author Richard Dawkins, noting his criticism of religion was unlikely to change religious fundamentalist minds and in fact more likely to strengthen their doubt of the scientific data. The framing science proposal created a large, often contentious debate within the online scientific blogging community, though research continues to study the influence of framing.

In the book Unscientific America, Mooney and co-author Sheril Kirshenbaum expressed the concern that some science communicators were pressing the view that one must make a choice between accepting science or accepting religion. Mooney defended his position in a number of publications and podcasts by citing that ongoing scientific studies continues to support the hypothesis that people integrate new information based on their pre-existing worldviews, and that failure to account for this fact will lead to continued failures in science communication.

== Written work ==
=== Bibliography ===
- The Republican War on Science. Basic Books. 2005. ISBN 978-0-465-04676-8.
- Storm World: Hurricanes, Politics, and the Battle over Global Warming. Houghton Mifflin Harcourt. 2007. ISBN 978-0-15-101287-9.
- Kirshenbaum, Sheril (2009). Unscientific America: How Scientific Illiteracy Threatens Our Future. Basic Books. ISBN 978-0-465-01305-0.
- The Republican Brain: The Science of Why They Deny Science – and Reality. Wiley. 2012. ISBN 978-1-118-09451-8.

=== Critical reviews ===
The Republican War on Science received many positive reviews. A review in Scientific American described it as well-researched and closely argued. Michael Stebbins wrote in Nature Medicine that the book should be a wake-up call and stated, "Mooney's documentation of the willful manipulation of science on the part of conservatives to suit an agenda is well supported and nauseating." It was featured on the cover of The New York Times Book Review and selected as an "Editors' Choice" by The New York Times.

Storm World was written after Mooney witnessed the devastation of his mother's house in Hurricane Katrina. Tom Hayden wrote in the Los Angeles Times that Mooney deftly handled the complexity of the questions surrounding global warming and its effect on hurricanes while weaving an intriguing and important story. A review in The New York Times Book Review called it "a well-researched, nuanced book" but criticized its organization and lack of "pizazz".

Unscientific America cowritten with Sheril Kirshenbaum addressed scientific illiteracy in America. A favorable review in Science Communication anticipated controversy. Less favorable reviews in the BMJ and the New Scientist supported the authors' analysis of the problem but were critical of the solutions proposed. American Scientist and Science published negative reviews, complaining about its lack of depth.

Writing about The Republican Brain in The New York Times Paul Krugman stated that Mooney makes a good point: the personality traits associated with modern conservatism, particularly a lack of openness, make the modern Republican Party hostile to the idea of objective inquiry. The book sparked some controversy, with two science writers calling Mooney's argument eugenics.

=== Other noted articles ===
- "Blinded by Science: How 'Balanced' Coverage Lets the Scientific Fringe Hijack Reality". Discover. 15 January 2010.
- "The Dover Monkey Trial". Seed. 1 October 2005. Archived from the original on 9 December 2009. Republished in Weiner, Jonathan, ed. (2005). The Best American Science & Nature Writing 2005. Houghton Mifflin Harcourt. ISBN 978-0-618-27343-0.
- Kirshenbaum, S.R.; —; Otto, S.L.; Chapman, M.; et al. (11 April 2008). "Science and the candidates". Policy Forum: Science and Government. Science. 320 (5873): 182. doi:10.1126/science.1158281. PMID 18403695.
- "If scientists want to educate the public, they should start by listening". The Washington Post (op-ed). 27 June 2010.
- Do Scientists Understand the Public? (PDF). Cambridge, MA: American Academy of Arts and Sciences. 2010. ISBN 978-0-87724-086-0.
