= Sheril Kirshenbaum =

American science writer and scientist

- Born: May 24, 1980 (age 46)
- Education: Tufts University, Michigan State University, University of Maine
- Occupations: Scientist, author, science policy advocate
- Known for: Unscientific America, The Science of Kissing
- Website: http://www.sherilkirshenbaum.com

Sheril Kirshenbaum (born May 24, 1980) is an American science writer and scientist. She co-authored Unscientific America: How Scientific Illiteracy Threatens Our Future with Chris Mooney, and wrote The Science of Kissing. She also co-founded and led Science Debate, a nonprofit organization with a stated goal of restoring science to its rightful place in politics.

Sheril has served as a Council on Foreign Relations International Affairs Fellow with Senator Gary Peters. She has also been a Presidential Leadership Scholar, a Marshall Memorial Fellow, a Next Generation Fellow through the Robert Strauss Center for International Security and Law, and a John A. Knauss Fellow in the U.S. Senate with Senator Bill Nelson.

Kirshenbaum currently works at Michigan State University and hosts Serving Up Science on PBS. Her research focuses on scientific decision-making in Congress. She is Jewish.
