= Shawn Lawrence Otto =

American novelist

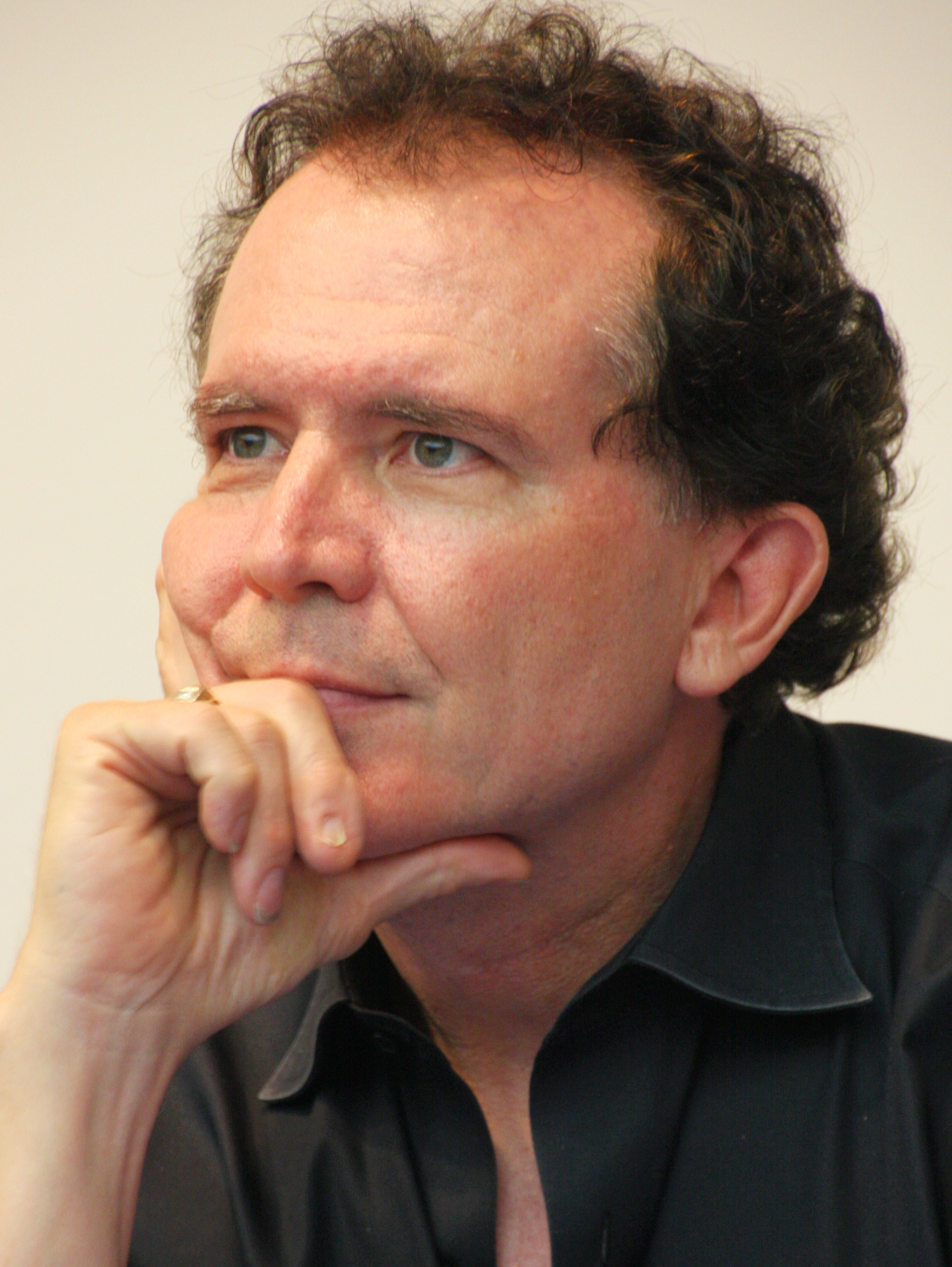
Otto in 2017

Shawn Lawrence Otto (born April 21, 1961) is an American novelist, nonfiction author, filmmaker, political strategist, speaker, science advocate, and screenwriter and co-producer of the 2003 film House of Sand and Fog.

== Biography ==
Otto co-founded and became the CEO of the Science Debate 2008. Presidential candidates Barack Obama and John McCain participated in the debate.

Otto delivered keynotes at the 45th annual Nobel Conference, on "Democracy in the Age of Science", at the United States National Academies, on "Examining the Mistrust of Science", the New York Academy of Sciences, the EuroScience Open Forum (ESOF), and the European Conference of Science Journalists. He has discussed science and politics on National Public Radio's Talk of the Nation: Science Friday.

Otto's work has been published in Science, Salon.com, Huffington Post, MinnPost.com, Issues in Science & Technology, New Scientist, and Scientific American.

Otto lives on a hobby farm near Marine on St. Croix with his wife, Rebecca Otto, a former Minnesota State Auditor and 2018 candidate for Governor. Their home, called "Breezy", is passive and active solar, geothermal, wind-powered, and super-insulated house that they designed and built. Otto's family forefather, C.D. Gilfillan, co-founded the Republican Party of Minnesota.

Otto is a past (2009–2011) Board Chair of the Loft Literary Center in Minneapolis.

== Works ==
- Sins of Our Fathers (ISBN 978-1571311092), a novel published in 2014 that received a starred review by Publishers Weekly and was a finalist for the Los Angeles Times Book Prize.
- Screenwriter and coproducer of the DreamWorks 2003 movie House of Sand and Fog
- Fool Me Twice: Fighting The Assault On Science In America (ISBN 978-1605292175)
- The War on Science: Who's Waging It, Why It Matters, What We Can Do About It (ISBN 978-1571313539)

== Awards and honors ==
- Otto's 2016 book The War on Science: Who's Waging It, Why It Matters, What We Can Do About It (ISBN 978-1571313539) won the Minnesota Book Award for General Nonfiction, in 2017.
- Otto's book Fool Me Twice won the 2012 Minnesota Book Award for non-fiction and received starred reviews from Kirkus and Publishers Weekly.
- His film House of Sand and Fog was nominated for three Academy Awards.
- Otto's first screenplay, Shining White, won the Heathcote Award, the McKnight Artist Fellowship and the Barry Morrow Fellowship.
- He is a PEN Center USA Literary Awards finalist in screenwriting for House of Sand and Fog.
- He is an Alfred P. Sloan Foundation Fellow for his project Hubble.
