= Science Debate 2008 =

Science Debate 2008, was a grassroots campaign to call for a public debate in which the candidates for the U.S. presidential election discuss issues relating to the environment, health and medicine, and science and technology policy.

In 2008, the effort was co-chaired by U.S. House representatives Vernon J. Ehlers and Rush D. Holt, Jr., and the steering committee includes Chris Mooney, Matthew Chapman, Arne Carlson, Lawrence Krauss, Sheril Kirshenbaum, John Rennie, and Shawn Lawrence Otto.

Both Barack Obama and John McCain participated in the initiative, which marked the first time in history the endorsed candidates for president laid out detailed science policies before the election. It became the largest political initiative in the history of American science, and made over 800 million media impressions.

Among the scientific organizations supporting the program were the Carnegie Institution of Washington, the American Association for the Advancement of Science, the National Academy of Sciences, the Union of Concerned Scientists, the Biophysical Society, and the Association for Women in Science. Other supporters included politicians, prominent research universities, Nobel laureates, business institutions, and science media editors.

Science Debate's partners in the debate were the National Academy of Science, the Institute of Medicine, the National Academy of Engineering, the Council on Competitiveness, and the American Association for the Advancement of Science.

Originally, the four top candidates for the 2008 election, Hillary Clinton, Barack Obama, Mike Huckabee, and John McCain, were officially invited to discuss science and technology issues at Philadelphia's Franklin Institute on April 18, 2008. However, after none of the candidates agreed to participate in the debate, a second invitation was sent, proposing a debate at Portland State University on May 2, May 9, or May 16. The moderator was to be David Brancaccio, and it was set to air on PBS. Unlike most other debates, the questions were to be provided in advance. Although the candidates did not agree to the two televised debates proposed by Science Debate 2008, both Obama and McCain did participate in an online written version, sciencedebate.org providing detailed responses to the "14 Top Science Questions Facing America," a list suggested by the organization's members, and the Obama answers formed an early basis for the Obama science policy. Several of the earliest supporters of Science Debate later joined Obama administration, including Energy Secretary Steven Chu, NOAA Director Jane Lubchenco, and Presidential Science Advisor John Holdren.

Science Debate 2008 has received media attention from MSNBC, Science Friday, Wired.com, Earth & Sky, as well as the editors of Scientific American and Science. An editorial in Nature cautioned that "the proposed debate can be seen as an attempt by various élite institutions to grab the microphone and set the agenda from the top down" and Nature columnist David Goldston stated that "there is no reason to assume that a presidential debate on science matters would be instructive for the public or helpful to scientists."

The Science Debate organization continued to be active through the 2020 campaign cycle.

== See also ==
- United States presidential election debates, 2008
- Democratic Party (United States) presidential debates, 2008
- Republican Party (United States) presidential debates, 2008
