= Michael Stebbins =

American geneticist

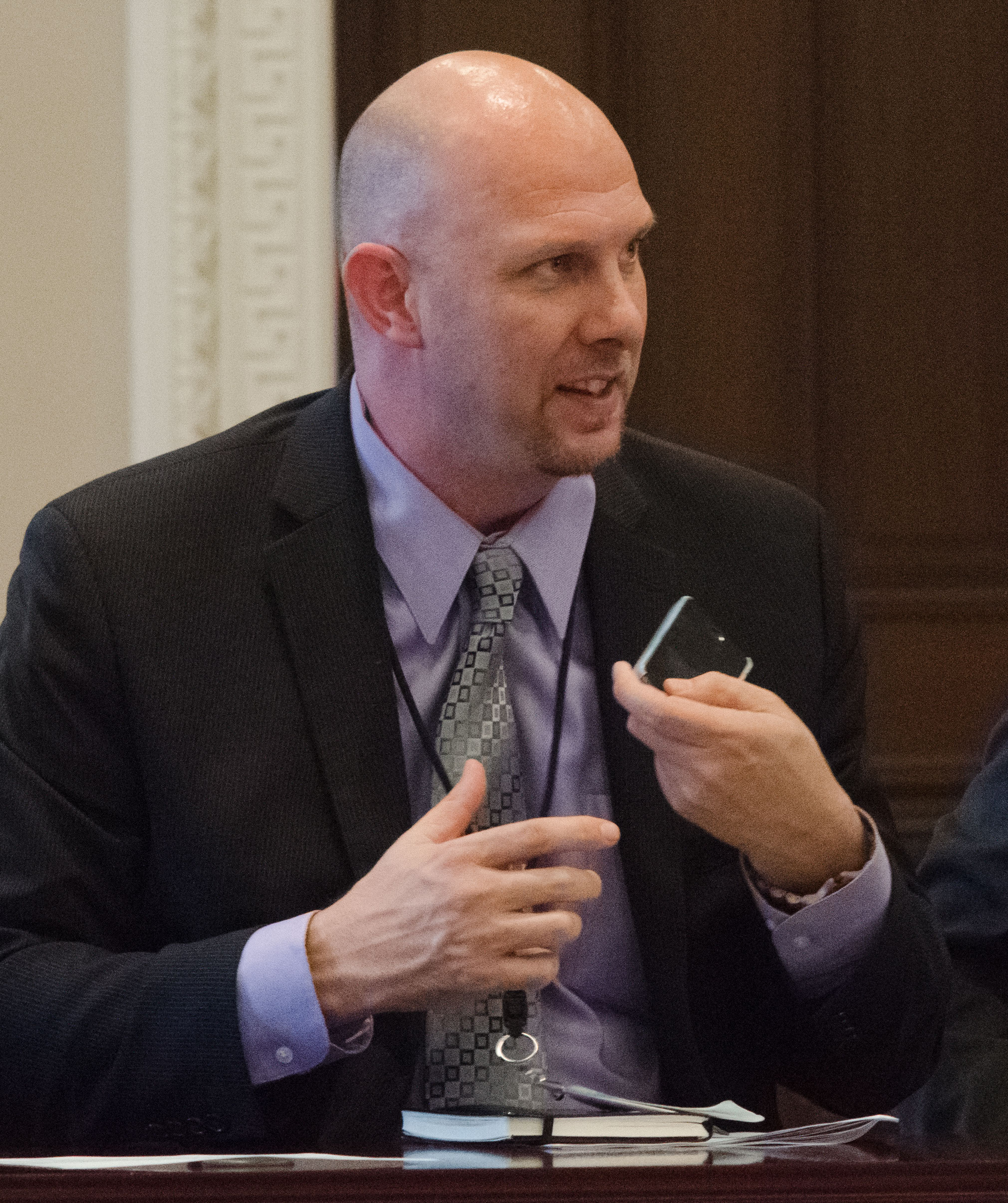
- Education: State University of New York, Cold Spring Harbor Laboratory (PhD)
- Known for: Proposing the creation of ARPA-H, authoring 8 executive Actions for President Obama.
- Scientific career
- Fields: Genetics, Public Policy
- Workplaces: The White House

Michael Stebbins is an American geneticist and President of Science Advisors, a consultancy that he established in 2018 to provide strategic guidance to a diverse array organizations in health and science including PBS, MIT, and the National Academies, with notable achievements such as founding a new federal agency (ARPA-H), and developing PBS KIDS' digital data strategy. He is the former Vice President of Science and Technology at the Laura and John Arnold Foundation and previously served for seven years as the Assistant Director for Biotechnology, at the White House Office of Science and Technology Policy.

== Education ==
He received his B.S. in biology from the State University of New York at Stony Brook, and his Ph.D. in genetics while working at Cold Spring Harbor Laboratory, where he constructed transgenic systems to control gene expression in the brains of animals for the study of long-term memory formation. That system is now used to create sterile male mosquitoes for the control of dengue fever and other mosquito borne diseases. Stebbins also created the first monoclonal antibody against luciferase, which is now sold worldwide in research kits using luciferase.

== Career ==
Stebbins is a former member of the National Academies of Science, Board on Research Data and Information. He serves on the Board of Directors for the Value in Cancer Care Consortium that aims to improve access, affordability, and value of cancer therapies and chairs the board for Vivli, whose mission is to "Promote, coordinate, and facilitate clinical research data sharing through the creation and implementation of a sustainable global data-sharing enterprise."

He is the former President of the SEA Action Fund, and co-founded and 'served on the Board of Scientists and Engineers for America (SEA), an organization that focused on getting scientists more engaged in public policy and politics, and promoted sound science in government. He is the former Director of Biology Policy for the Federation of American Scientists (FAS), where he worked on control of biological weapons, preparedness for biological, nuclear, and chemical weapons attacks, and the responsible use of science and technology.

On November 18, 2008, Stebbins was named a member of the Obama transition in the "Executive Office of the President Team," with responsibility for the Office of Science Technology and Policy."

At the White House, Stebbins was responsible for developing and driving initiatives in life sciences research, including the Administration's efforts focused on improving veterans' mental health, combating antibiotic resistance, increasing access to federally funded scientific research results, restoring pollinator health, and reforming the regulatory system for biotechnology products.

Dr. Stebbins served as the Vice President of Science and Technology for the Laura and John Arnold Foundation where he was responsible for opening their Washington DC office and establishing a science and technology investment portfolio for the foundation.

In April 2020, Stebbins co-wrote the proposal for the creation of a new federal agency modeled on DARPA, but focused on health. That proposal was adopted by the President Biden's campaign and became the model used to establish the Advanced Research Projects Agency for Health (ARPA-H).

Previously, Stebbins worked as a legislative fellow for U. S. Senator Harry Reid (D-NV) where he led efforts to repeal President George W. Bush's ban on the use of federal funding for research on embryonic stem cells and created a platform for addressing the challenges faced by people with disabilities.

He worked as a policy fellow for the National Human Genome Research Institute. He has also worked as a senior editor for the journal Nature Genetics, and as a science journalist for Reuters. He has written for Seed Magazine, and is a science advisor to ScienCentral, a company that produces science-related news stories for ABC and NBC television affiliates.

== Publications ==
- Behavioral Economics Megastudies are Necessary to Make America Healthy, 2025
- In Honor of Patient Safety Day, Four Recommendations to Improve Healthcare Outcomes, 2025
- Creating a US Innovation Accelerator Modeled On In-Q-Tel, 2025
- There's a better way to get drugs on the market: progressive approval, 2025
- The future of open research policy should be evidence based, 2024
- An Invisible Hand for Creating Value from Data, 2024 Harvard Data Science Review
- Book Chapter: A circuitous career from Science to Science Policy and beyond, 2024
- Using DNA to reunify separated migrant families, 2021
- Re-envisioning scientific methods reporting, 2021
- Establishing the White House Council on Disabilities to address modern challenges for the disabilities community, 2021
- How a DNA database can reunite migrant families, 2021
- Opening Up Mortality Data for Health Research, 2021
- Adopting an Open-Source Approach to Pharmaceutical Research and Development, 2020
- Open Access to Federally Funded Research Data, 2020
- The failure of distance learning presents an opportunity to better engage parents, The Hill, 2020
- Hackers are targeting the COVID-19 response and putting lives at risk, The Hill, 2020
- Time for NIH to Lead on Data Sharing, Science, 2020
- Creating the Health Advanced Research Projects Agency (HARPA), 2020
- NCCN validates path toward de-escalated doses and reduced costs of cancer drugs, The Cancer Letter, 29 March 2019, Issue 13Volume 45; 4-5
- Enhancing Transparency at the US Food and Drug Administration, JAMA, 2017; 317(16):1621-1622
- Preprints for the life sciences, Science, 20 May 2016: Vol. 352, Issue 6288, pp. 899-901

Stebbins is the author of the book Sex, Drugs and DNA: Science's Taboos Confronted and was also a frequent contributor to This Week in Science, where he discussed issues relating to science and policy in his segment titled "The Weird from Washington".
