= Agnotology =

Study of culturally induced ignorance or doubt

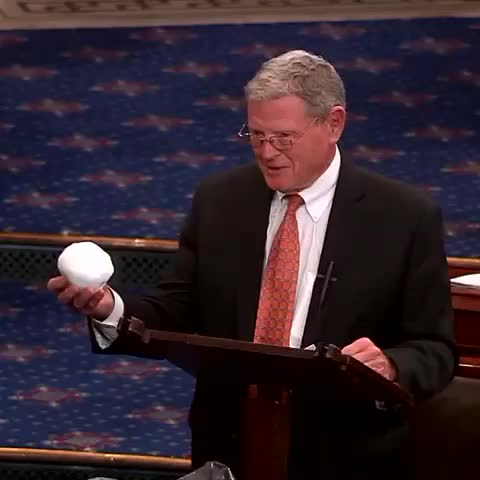
Having called conclusions about human-caused climate change "alarmist", contrary to the scientific consensus on climate change, Republican Senator Jim Inhofe displayed a snowball—in winter—as evidence the globe was not warming, in a year that was found to be Earth's warmest to date. The director of NASA's Goddard Institute for Space Studies distinguished local weather in a single location in a single week from global climate change.

Within the sociology of knowledge, agnotology (formerly agnatology) is the study of deliberate, culturally cultivated ignorance or doubt, typically to sell a product, influence opinion, or win favour, particularly through the publication of inaccurate or misleading scientific data (i.e. disinformation). More generally, the term includes the condition where more knowledge of a subject creates greater uncertainty.

Stanford University professor Robert N. Proctor cites the Tobacco industry playbook to manufacture doubt about the adverse health effects of tobacco use as a prime example. David Dunning of Cornell University warns that powerful interests exploit the internet to "propagate ignorance".

Active agents of culturally cultivated ignorance include mass media, corporations, and government agencies, operating through secrecy and suppression of information, document destruction, and selective memory. Passive causes include structural information bubbles, such as those produced by racial or class divisions, characterized by limited and selective access to information. Agnotology also focuses on how and why diverse knowledge does not "come to be", or is ignored or delayed. For example, knowledge about plate tectonics was censored and delayed for at least a decade because some evidence remained classified military information related to undersea warfare.

The availability of large amounts of knowledge may allow people to cherry-pick information (whether factual or not) that reinforces their beliefs, a practice known as confirmation bias, and ignore inconvenient knowledge by consuming repetitive or fact-free entertainment. Evidence conflicts on how television affects viewers.

== Origins ==
There is a cult of ignorance in the United States, and there has always been. The strain of anti-intellectualism has been a constant thread winding its way through our political and cultural life, nurtured by the false notion that democracy means that
"my ignorance is just as good as your knowledge".

— Isaac Asimov, 1980

The term was coined in 1992 by linguist and social historian Iain Boal, at the request of Stanford University professor Robert N. Proctor. The word is based on the Neoclassical Greek word agnōsis (ἄγνωσις, 'not knowing'; cf. Attic Greek ἄγνωτος, 'unknown' and -logia (-λογία). The term "agnotology" first appeared in print in a footnote in Stanford University professor Proctor's 1995 book, The Cancer Wars: How Politics Shapes What We Know and Don't Know About Cancer:

Historians and philosophers of science have tended to treat ignorance as an ever-expanding vacuum into which knowledge is sucked – or even, as Johannes Kepler once put it, as the mother who must die for science to be born. Ignorance, though, is more complex than this. It has a distinct and changing political geography that is often an excellent indicator of the politics of knowledge. We need a political agnotology to complement our political epistemologies.

In a 2001 interview about his lapidary work with agate, Proctor used the term to describe his research "only half jokingly" as "agnotology". He connected the topics by noting the lack of geologic knowledge and study of agate since its first known description by Theophrastus in 300 BC, relative to the extensive research on other rocks and minerals such as diamonds, asbestos, granite, and coal. He said agate was a "victim of scientific disinterest," the same "structured apathy" he called "the social construction of ignorance". He was later quoted as calling it "agnotology, the study of ignorance," in a 2003 The New York Times story on medical historians who testify as expert witnesses.

In 2004, Londa Schiebinger, an historian and the then new director of the Institute for Research on Women and Gender (IRWG), argued that agnotology questions why humans do not know important information and that it could be an "outcome of cultural and political struggle". In 2004, Schiebinger offered a more precise definition in a paper on 18th-century voyages of scientific discovery and gender relations, and contrasted it with epistemology, the theory of knowledge, saying that the latter questions how humans know while the former questions why humans do not know: "Ignorance is often not merely the absence of knowledge but an outcome of cultural and political struggle." Proctor co-organized events with Schiebinger, his wife and fellow professor of science history. In 2008, they published an anthology entitled Agnotology: The Making and Unmaking of Ignorance which "provides a new theoretical perspective to broaden traditional questions about 'how we know' to ask: Why don't we know what we don't know?" They locate agnotology within the field of epistemology.

== Examples ==
Proctor offers some examples where agnotology may explain instances of unnatural ignorance. The fossil fuel industry used agnotological techniques in its campaign against the scientific consensus on climate change. It became the focus of the 2010 book Merchants of Doubt by Naomi Oreskes and Erik M. Conway. Oil companies paid teams of scientists to downplay its effects.

Michael Betancourt used agnotology in a critical assessment of political economy in a 2010 article and book. His analysis focused on the housing bubble as well as the 1980 to 2008 period. Betancourt argued that this political economy should be termed "agnotologic capitalism", claiming that the systematic production and maintenance of ignorance enabled a "bubble economy" that allowed the economy to function. In his view, the role of affective labor is to create/maintain agnotologic views that enable the maintenance of the capitalist status quo. This is done by proffering counters to every fact, creating contention and confusion that is difficult to resolve. This confusion reduces dissent by deenergizing its motivating alienation and thus its potential to address weaknesses that may trigger collapse.

== Related concepts ==
=== Agnoiology ===
From the same Greek roots, agnoiology refers either to "the science or study of ignorance, which determines its quality and conditions" or "the doctrine concerning those things of which we are necessarily ignorant," describing a branch of philosophy studied by James Frederick Ferrier in the 19th century.

=== Ainigmology ===
Anthropologist Glenn Stone points out that some examples of agnotology (such as work promoting tobacco use) do not actually create a lack of knowledge so much as they create confusion. As a more accurate term Stone suggested "ainigmology", from the Greek root ainigma (as in 'enigma'), referring to riddles or to language that obscures the true meaning of a story.

=== Cognitronics ===
An emerging scientific discipline that connects to agnotology is cognitronics, which aims to explain distortions in perception caused by the information society and globalization and cope with these distortions.

=== Unknowledge ===
Irvin C. Schick distinguishes unknowledge from ignorance, using the example of "terra incognita" in early maps in which mapmakers marked unexplored territories with that or similar labels, which provided "potential objects of Western political and economic attention."

== See also ==
- Antiscience – Attitudes that reject science and the scientific method
- Anti-intellectualism – Hostility to and mistrust of education, philosophy, art, literature, and science
- Cancer Wars – 1998 documentary, a six-part documentary that aired on PBS in 1997, based on Robert N. Proctor's 1995 book, Cancer Wars: How Politics Shapes What we Know and Don't Know About Cancer
- Cognitive dissonance – Mental phenomenon of holding contradictory beliefs, a social psychology theory that may explain the ease of maintaining ignorance (because people are driven to ignore conflicting evidence) and which also provides clues to how to bring about knowledge (perhaps by forcing the learner to reconcile reality with long-held, though inaccurate beliefs; see Socratic method)
- Cognitive inertia – Lack of motivation to mentally tackle a problem or issue
- Confirmation bias – Bias confirming existing attitudes
- Conspiracy of silence (expression) – "Culture of silence"
- Creationism – Belief that nature originated through supernatural acts, systematic denial of scientific biological realities by misrepresenting them in terms of various dogmatic tenets
- Denialism – Rejecting scientific or historical consensus
- Doubt Is Their Product – 2008 book by David Michaels
- The Dunning–Kruger effect, a cognitive bias whereby people with low ability at a task overestimate their skill level, and people with high ability at a task underestimate their skill level.
- Fear, uncertainty and doubt (FUD) – Tactic used to influence opinion, a disinformation technique using the appeal to fear
- Intelligent design – Pseudoscientific argument for the existence of God, a class of creationism that attempts to support assorted topics in biological denialism by misrepresenting them and related junk science as scientific research
- Japanese commercial whaling – Commercial hunting of whales in Japan, an attempt at obfuscation of the culpability of commercial whaling by misrepresenting its junk-scientific rationale as scientific research.
- Junk science – Scientific data considered to be spurious or fraudulent
- Merchants of Doubt – 2010 book by Naomi Oreskes and Erik M. Conway
- Misinformation
- Historical negationism – Distortion of historical record
- Myth of the flat Earth
- Neo-Luddism – Philosophy opposing modern technology
- Obscurantism – Practice of obscuring information
- Pseudoscience – Unscientific claims presented as scientific
- Scientific skepticism – Questioning of claims lacking empirical evidence
- Sociology of scientific ignorance – Study of ignorance in science, or Ignorance Studies, the study of ignorance as something relevant.
- Subvertising – Parody advertising
- The Republican War on Science – 2005 book by Chris Mooney
- Thought suppression – Conscious effort to discontinue a thought
- Vaccine controversies – Reluctance or refusal of vaccines, based on assorted junk-scientific strategies to misrepresent life- and health-saving technologies as harmful rather than beneficial.
- Willful ignorance – Strategy of avoiding accountably or liability
