= William R. Steiger =

American government official

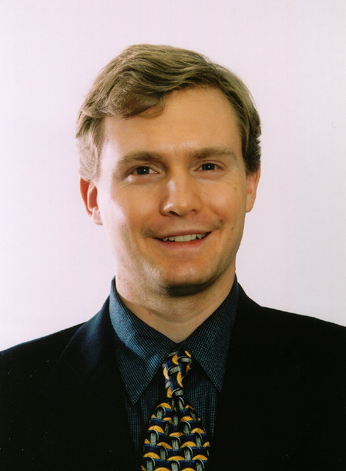
William R. Steiger

William Raymond Steiger (born 1969 in Arlington, Virginia) is the CEO of Malaria No More in Washington, D.C. He was a Public Policy Fellow at the Wilson Center and chief of staff at the United States Agency for International Development from 2017 to 2021. Previously, Steiger was the chief program officer at Pink Ribbon Red Ribbon, an organization affiliated with the George W. Bush Institute, which works to reduce deaths from cervical cancer and breast cancer in low- and middle-income countries. He was the special assistant to the secretary for international affairs and the director of the Office of Global Health Affairs at the U.S. Department of Health and Human Services (DHHS) during the George W. Bush administration, with a portfolio that included HIV/AIDS, malaria, avian flu and pandemic-influenza preparedness.

== Early life and education ==
Steiger is the son of the late Congressman William A. Steiger (a Republican who represented the 6th District of Wisconsin) and the late Janet Dempsey Steiger, former chair of the U.S. Federal Trade Commission, and the godson of former president George H. W. Bush. Steiger graduated cum laude in 1987 from the college preparatory St. Albans School for Boys in Washington, D.C. He graduated from Yale College summa cum laude with a degree in history in 1991. He earned an M.A. and Ph.D. in Latin American History at the University of California, Los Angeles. In 1995–96, Steiger was a Luce Scholar in the Philippines; he taught Latin American History at the University of the Philippines, Diliman, and the Ateneo de Manila University.

== Bush administration tenure ==
Steiger's role in the Bush administration was the subject of controversy. He was charged with implementing a Bush administration policy declaring that U.S. government scientists and public-health experts must "serve as representatives of the U.S. government at all times and advocate U.S. government policies." The policy required that U.S. government scientists be cleared by a political appointee before accepting invitations to World Health Organization (WHO) meetings. The policy was criticized in the scientific community as an effort to politicize science, while the Bush administration defended its policy by arguing than HHS was in a better position than WHO to know which scientists to send to meetings.

Steiger was involved in several other scientific-political controversies during the Bush administration. In 2004, on behalf of the administration, he attacked a WHO plan to combat obesity, arguing that the link between the marketing of high-fat foods and obesity was unproven, as was the role of vegetables and fruit in a healthy diet. Steiger's letter echoed complaints about the report from the U.S. sugar and food lobbies.

Steiger was also identified in a Washington Post story by several public health officials as responsible for blocking the publication of U.S. Surgeon General Richard Carmona's report on global health problems, allegedly because the report failed to advance the Bush administration's political agenda. Steiger, who according to the Post lacked "any background or expertise in medicine or public health", attributed the rejection of the report to "sloppy work, poor analysis, and lack of scientific rigor" on the part of the Surgeon General's office.

== Later career ==
Steiger has served as the U.S. Member of the executive board of the World Health Organization, President of the executive committee of the Pan-American Health Organization, and U.S. Member and Alternate Member on the board of directors of the Global Fund to Fight AIDS, Tuberculosis, and Malaria. He acted as the HHS Secretary's liaison to the United States National Security Council, the U.S. Department of State, and the U.S. Agency for International Development. He also served as the department's representative to the Office of the U.S. Global AIDS Coordinator in the implementation of the President's Emergency Plan for AIDS Relief (PEPFAR), and to the Steering Committee that manages the President's International Malaria Initiative. Steiger served on the selection committee that chose Peter Sands to succeed Mark Dybul as executive director of the Global Fund to Fight AIDS, Tuberculosis and Malaria (GFATM) in 2017. Steiger served as the chief of staff at the U.S. Agency for International Development (USAID) as a political appointee in the Trump administration. He is a contributor to the Project 2025 Mandate for Leadership: The Conservative Promise. He joined Malaria No More as CEO in 2026.
