= Antiscience =

Attitudes that reject science and the scientific method

Antiscience is a set of attitudes and a form of anti-intellectualism that involves a rejection of science and the scientific method. People holding antiscientific views do not accept science as an objective method that can generate universal knowledge. Antiscience commonly manifests through rejection of scientific ideas such as climate change and evolution and the effectiveness of vaccination. It also includes pseudoscience, methods that claim to be scientific but reject the scientific method. Antiscience can lead to belief in false conspiracy theories and alternative medicine. Lack of trust in science has been linked to the promotion of political extremism, corruption and distrust in medical treatments.

== History ==
In the early days of the Scientific Revolution, scientists such as Robert Boyle (1627–1691) found themselves in conflict with those such as Thomas Hobbes (1588–1679), who were skeptical of whether science was a satisfactory way to obtain genuine knowledge about the world.

Hobbes' stance is regarded by Ian Shapiro as an antiscience position:

In his Six Lessons to the Professors of Mathematics,...[published in 1656, Hobbes] distinguished 'demonstrable' fields, as 'those the construction of the subject whereof is in the power of the artist himself,' from 'indemonstrable' ones 'where the causes are to seek for.' We can only know the causes of what we make. So geometry is demonstrable, because 'the lines and figures from which we reason are drawn and described by ourselves' and 'civil philosophy is demonstrable, because we make the commonwealth ourselves.' But we can only speculate about the natural world, because 'we know not the construction, but seek it from the effects.'

In his book Reductionism: Analysis and the Fullness of Reality, published in 2000, Richard H. Jones wrote that Hobbes "put forth the idea of the significance of the nonrational in human behaviour". Jones goes on to group Hobbes with others he classes as "antireductionists" and "individualists", including Wilhelm Dilthey (1833–1911), Karl Marx (1818–1883), Jeremy Bentham (1748–1832) and J S Mill (1806–1873), later adding Karl Popper (1902–1994), John Rawls (1921–2002), and E. O. Wilson (1929–2021) to the list.

Jean-Jacques Rousseau, in his Discourse on the Arts and Sciences (1750), claimed that science can lead to immorality. "Rousseau argues that the progression of the sciences and arts has caused the corruption of virtue and morality" and his "critique of science has much to teach us about the dangers involved in our political commitment to scientific progress, and about the ways in which the future happiness of mankind might be secured". Nevertheless, Rousseau does not state in his Discourses that sciences are necessarily bad, and states that figures like René Descartes, Francis Bacon, and Isaac Newton should be held in high regard. In the conclusion to the Discourses, he says that these (aforementioned) can cultivate sciences to great benefit, and that morality's corruption is mostly because of society's bad influence on scientists.

William Blake reacted strongly in his paintings and writings against the work of Isaac Newton, and is seen as being perhaps the earliest (and almost certainly the most prominent and enduring) example of what is seen by historians as the aesthetic or Romantic antiscience response. For example, in his 1795 poem "Auguries of Innocence", Blake describes the beautiful and natural robin redbreast imprisoned by what one might interpret as the materialistic cage of Newtonian mathematics and science. Blake's painting of Newton depicts the scientist "as a misguided hero whose gaze was directed only at sterile geometrical diagrams drawn on the ground". Blake thought that "Newton, Bacon, and Locke with their emphasis on reason were nothing more than 'the three great teachers of atheism, or Satan's Doctrine'...the picture progresses from exuberance and colour on the left, to sterility and blackness on the right. In Blake's view Newton brings not light, but night". In a 1940 poem, W.H. Auden summarises Blake's anti-scientific views by saying that he "[broke] off relations in a curse, with the Newtonian Universe".

One recent biographer of Newton considers him more as a renaissance alchemist, natural philosopher, and magician rather than a true representative of scientific Enlightenment, as popularized by Voltaire (1694–1778) and other Newtonians.

Antiscience issues are seen as a fundamental consideration in the historical transition from "pre-science" or "protoscience" such as that evident in alchemy. Many disciplines that pre-date the widespread adoption and acceptance of the scientific method, such as geometry and astronomy, are not seen as anti-science. However, some of the orthodoxies within those disciplines that predate a scientific approach (such as those orthodoxies repudiated by the discoveries of Galileo (1564–1642)) are seen as being a product of an anti-scientific stance.

Friedrich Nietzsche in The Gay Science (1882) questions scientific dogmatism:

"[...] in Science, convictions have no rights of citizenship, as is said with good reason. Only when they decide to descend to the modesty of a hypothesis, of a provisional experimental point of view, of a regulative fiction, maybe they be granted admission and even a certain value within the realm of knowledge – though always with the restriction that they remain under police supervision, under the police of mistrust. But does this not mean, more precisely considered, that a conviction may obtain admission to science only when it ceases to be a conviction? Would not the discipline of the scientific spirit begin with this, no longer to permit oneself any convictions? Probably that is how it is. But one must still ask whether it is not the case that, in order that this discipline could begin, a conviction must have been there already, and even such a commanding and unconditional one that it sacrificed all other convictions for its own sake. It is clear that Science too rests on a faith; there is no Science 'without presuppositions.' The question whether truth is needed must not only have been affirmed in advance, but affirmed to the extent that the principle, the faith, the conviction is expressed: 'nothing is needed more than truth, and in relation to it, everything else has only second-rate value".

The term "scientism", originating in science studies, was adopted and is used by sociologists and philosophers of science to describe the views, beliefs and behavior of strong supporters of applying ostensibly scientific concepts beyond its traditional disciplines. Specifically, scientism promotes science as the best or only objective means to determine normative and epistemological values. The term scientism is generally used critically, implying a cosmetic application of science in unwarranted situations considered not amenable to application of the scientific method or similar scientific standards. The word is commonly used in a pejorative sense, applying to individuals who seem to be treating science in a similar way to a religion. The term reductionism is occasionally used in a similarly pejorative way (as a more subtle attack on scientists). However, some scientists feel comfortable being labelled as reductionists, while agreeing that there might be conceptual and philosophical shortcomings of reductionism.

However, non-reductionist (see Emergentism) views of science have been formulated in varied forms in several scientific fields like statistical physics, chaos theory, complexity theory, cybernetics, systems theory, systems biology, ecology, information theory, etc. Such fields tend to assume that strong interactions between units produce new phenomena in "higher" levels that cannot be accounted for solely by reductionism. For example, it is not valuable (or currently possible) to describe a chess game or gene networks using quantum mechanics. The emergentist view of science ("More is Different", in the words of 1977 Nobel-laureate physicist Philip W. Anderson) has been inspired in its methodology by the European social sciences (Durkheim, Marx) which tend to reject methodological individualism.

== Political ==
Elyse Amend and Darin Barney argue that while antiscience can be a descriptive label, it is often used as a rhetorical one, being effectively used to discredit one's political opponents. Thus, charges of antiscience are not necessarily warranted.

=== Left-wing ===
One expression of antiscience is the "denial of universality and... legitimisation of alternatives" and that the results of scientific findings do not always represent any underlying reality but can merely reflect the ideology of dominant groups within society. Alan Sokal states that this view associates science with the political right and is seen as a belief system that is conservative and conformist, that suppresses innovation, that resists change, and that acts dictatorially. This includes the view, for example, that science has a "bourgeois and/or Eurocentric and/or masculinist world-view".

The anti-nuclear movement, often associated with the left, has been criticized for overstating the negative effects of nuclear power, and understating the environmental costs of non-nuclear sources that can be prevented through nuclear energy. Opposition to genetically modified organisms (GMOs) has also been associated with the left.

=== Right-wing ===
The origin of antiscience thinking may be traced back to the reaction of Romanticism to the Enlightenment, a movement often referred to as the Counter-Enlightenment. Romanticism emphasizes that intuition, passion, and organic links to nature are primal values and that rational thinking is merely a product of human life. Modern right-wing antiscience includes climate change denial, rejection of evolution, misinformation about transgender healthcare, Modern flat Earth beliefs, and misinformation about COVID-19 vaccines. While concentrated in areas of science that are seen as motivating government action, these attitudes are strong enough to make conservatives appreciate science less in general.

Characteristics of antiscience associated with the right include the appeal to conspiracy theories to explain why scientists believe what they believe, in an attempt to undermine the confidence or power usually associated to science (e.g., in global warming conspiracy theories). In modern times, it has been argued that right-wing politics carries an anti-science tendency. While some have suggested that this is innate to either rightists or their beliefs, others have argued it is a "quirk" of a historical and political context in which scientific findings happened to challenge or appeared to challenge the worldviews of rightists rather than leftists.

=== Religious ===
In this context, antiscience may be considered dependent on religious, moral, and cultural arguments. For this kind of religious antiscience philosophy, science is an anti-spiritual and materialistic force that undermines traditional values, ethnic identity, and accumulated historical wisdom in favor of reason and cosmopolitanism. In particular, the traditional and ethnic values emphasized are similar to those of white supremacist Christian Identity theology. Still, similar right-wing views have been developed by radically conservative sects of Islam, Judaism, Hinduism, and Buddhism. New religious movements such as the left-wing New Age and the far-right Falun Gong thinking also criticize the scientific worldview as favouring a reductionist, atheist, or materialist philosophy.

A frequent basis of antiscientific sentiment is religious theism with literal interpretations of sacred text. Here, scientific theories that conflict with divinely inspired knowledge are regarded as flawed. The body of creation theologies known collectively as creationism, including the teleological theory of intelligent design, has been promoted by religious theists (primarily fundamentalists) in response to the process of evolution by natural selection. One of the more extreme creation theologies, young Earth creationism, also finds itself in conflict with research in cosmology, historical geology, and the origin of life. Young Earth creationism is predominantly found amongst fundamentalist Protestant Christianity, though it is also present in Catholicism and Judaism, albeit to a lesser extent.

Studies suggest that a belief in spirituality rather than religion may better indicate an anti-science position.

To the extent that attempts to overcome antiscience sentiments have failed, some argue that a different approach to science advocacy is needed. One such approach says that it is important to develop a more accurate understanding of those who deny science (avoiding stereotyping them as backward and uneducated) and also to attempt outreach via those who share cultural values with target audiences, such as scientists who also hold religious beliefs.

== Areas ==
There is a cult of ignorance in the United States, and there has always been. The strain of anti-intellectualism has been a constant thread winding its way through our political and cultural life, nurtured by the false notion that democracy means that "my ignorance is just as good as your knowledge".

— Isaac Asimov, "A Cult of Ignorance", Newsweek, 21 January 1980

Historically, antiscience first arose as a reaction against scientific materialism. The 18th century Enlightenment had ushered in "the ideal of a unified system of all the sciences", but there were those fearful of this notion, who "felt that constrictions of reason and science, of a single all-embracing system... were in some way constricting, an obstacle to their vision of the world, chains on their imagination or feeling". Antiscience then is a rejection of "the scientific model [or paradigm]... with its strong implication that only that which was quantifiable, or at any rate, measurable... was real". In this sense, it comprises a "critical attack upon the total claim of the new scientific method to dominate the entire field of human knowledge". However, scientific positivism (logical positivism) does not deny the reality of non-measurable phenomena, only that those phenomena should not be adequate to scientific investigation. Moreover, positivism, as a philosophical basis for the scientific method, is not consensual or even dominant in the scientific community (see philosophy of science).

Recent developments and discussions around antiscience attitudes reveal how deeply intertwined these beliefs are with social, political, and psychological factors. A study published by Ohio State News on July 11, 2022, identified four primary bases that underpin antiscience beliefs: doubts about the credibility of scientific sources, identification with groups holding antiscience attitudes, conflicts between scientific messages and personal beliefs, and discrepancies between the presentation of scientific messages and individuals' thinking styles. These factors are exacerbated in the current political climate, where ideology significantly influences people's acceptance of science, particularly on topics that have become politically polarized, such as vaccines and climate change. The politicization of science poses a significant challenge to public health and safety, particularly in managing global crises like the COVID-19 pandemic.

The following quotes explore this aspect of four major areas of antiscience: philosophy, sociology, ecology and politics.

=== Philosophy ===
Philosophical objections against science are often objections about the role of reductionism. For example, in the field of psychology, "both reductionists and antireductionists accept that... non-molecular explanations may not be improved, corrected or grounded in molecular ones". Further, "epistemological antireductionism holds that, given our finite mental capacities, we would not be able to grasp the ultimate physical explanation of many complex phenomena even if we knew the laws governing their ultimate constituents". Some see antiscience as "common...in academic settings...many people see that there are problems in demarcation between science, scientism, and pseudoscience resulting in an antiscience stance. Some argue that nothing can be known for sure".

Many philosophers are "divided as to whether reduction should be a central strategy for understanding the world". However, many agree that "there are, nevertheless, reasons why we want science to discover properties and explanations other than reductive physical ones". Such issues stem "from an antireductionist worry that there is no absolute conception of reality, that is, a characterization of reality such as... science claims to provide".

=== Sociology ===
Sociologist Thomas Gieryn refers to "some sociologists who might appear to be antiscience". Some "philosophers and antiscience types", he contends, may have presented "unreal images of science that threaten the believability of scientific knowledge", or appear to have gone "too far in their antiscience deconstructions". The question often lies in how much scientists conform to the standard ideal of "communalism, universalism, disinterestedness, originality, and... skepticism". "scientists don't always conform... scientists do get passionate about pet theories; they do rely on reputation in judging a scientist's work; they do pursue fame and gain via research". Thus, they may show inherent biases in their work. "[Many] scientists are not as rational and logical as the legend would have them, nor are they as illogical or irrational as some relativists might say".

=== Ecology and health sphere ===
Within the ecological and health spheres, Levins identifies a conflict "not between science and antiscience, but rather between different pathways for science and technology; between a commodified science-for-profit and a gentle science for humane goals; between the sciences of the smallest parts and the sciences of dynamic wholes... [he] offers proposals for a more holistic, integral approach to understanding and addressing environmental issues". These beliefs are also common within the scientific community, with for example, scientists being prominent in environmental campaigns warning of environmental dangers such as ozone depletion and the greenhouse effect. In the medical sphere, patients and practitioners may choose to reject science and adopt a pseudoscientific approach to health problems. This can be both a practical and a conceptual shift and has attracted strong criticism: "therapeutic touch, a healing technique based upon the laying-on of hands, has found wide acceptance in the nursing profession despite its lack of scientific plausibility. Its acceptance is indicative of a broad antiscientific trend in nursing".

Glazer also criticises the therapists and patients, "for abandoning the biological underpinnings of nursing and for misreading philosophy in the service of an antiscientific world-view". In contrast, Brian Martin criticized Gross and Levitt by saying that "[their] basic approach is to attack constructivists for not being positivists," and that science is "presented as a unitary object, usually identified with scientific knowledge. It is portrayed as neutral and objective. Second, science is claimed to be under attack by 'antiscience' which is composed essentially of ideologues who are threats to the neutrality and objectivity that are fundamental to science. Third, a highly selective attack is made on the arguments of 'antiscience'". Such people allegedly then "routinely equate critique of scientific knowledge with hostility to science, a jump that is logically unsupportable and empirically dubious". Having then "constructed two artificial entities, a unitary 'science' and a unitary 'academic left', each reduced to epistemological essences, Gross and Levitt proceed to attack. They pick out figures in each of several areas – science studies, postmodernism, feminism, environmentalism, AIDS activism – and criticise their critiques of science".

The writings of Young serve to illustrate more antiscientific views: "The strength of the antiscience movement and of alternative technology is that their advocates have managed to retain Utopian vision while still trying to create concrete instances of it". "The real social, ideological and economic forces shaping science...[have] been opposed to the point of suppression in many quarters. Most scientists hate it and label it 'antiscience'. But it is urgently needed, because it makes science self-conscious and hopefully self-critical and accountable with respect to the forces which shape research priorities, criteria, goals".

Genetically modified foods also bring about antiscience sentiment. The general public has recently become more aware of the dangers of a poor diet, as there have been numerous studies that show that the two are inextricably linked. Anti-science dictates that science is untrustworthy, because it is never complete and always being revised, which would be a probable cause for the fear that the general public has of genetically modified foods despite scientific reassurance that such foods are safe.

Antivaccinationists rely on whatever comes to hand presenting some of their arguments as if scientific; however, a strain of antiscience is part of their approach.

=== Political ===
Political scientist Tom Nichols, from Harvard Extension School and the U.S. Naval War College, points out that skepticism towards scientific expertise has increasingly become a symbol of political identity, especially within conservative circles. This skepticism is not just a result of misinformation but also reflects a broader cultural shift towards diminishing trust in experts and authoritative sources. This trend challenges the traditional neutrality of science, positioning scientific beliefs and facts within the contentious arena of political ideology.

The COVID-19 pandemic, for example, conflicting responses to public health measures and vaccine acceptance have highlighted the extent to which science has been politicized. Such polarization suggests that for some, rejecting scientific consensus or public health guidance serves as an expression of political allegiance or skepticism towards perceived authority figures.

This politicization of science complicates efforts to address public health crises and undermines the broader social contract that underpins scientific research and its application for the public good. The challenge lies not only in combating misinformation but also in bridging ideological divides that affect public trust in science. Strategies to counteract antiscience attitudes may need to encompass more than just presenting factual information; they might also need to engage with the underlying social and psychological factors that contribute to these attitudes, fostering dialogue that acknowledges different viewpoints and seeks common ground.

== Antiscience media ==
Major antiscience media include portals Natural News, Global Revolution TV, TruthWiki.org, TheAntiMedia.org and GoodGopher. Antiscience views have also been supported on social media by organizations known to support fake news such as the web brigades.

== See also ==
- Anarcho-primitivism – Anarchist critique of civilization
- Anti-intellectualism – Hostility to and mistrust of education, philosophy, art, literature, and science
- Anti-psychiatry – Movement against psychiatric treatment
- Authoritarianism – Political system
- Creation science – Pseudoscientific form of Young Earth creationism
- Modern Flat Earth societies – Anti-scientific belief
- Bruno Latour – French philosopher, anthropologist and sociologist (1947–2022)
- Denialism – Rejecting scientific or historical consensus
- Philosophical skepticism – Philosophical views that question the possibility of knowledge or certainty
- Ernst Cassirer – German philosopher (1874–1945)
- Eugenics – Effort to improve purported human genetic quality
- Faith and rationality
- Fundamentalism – Unwavering attachment to a set of irreducible beliefs
- Georg Wilhelm Friedrich Hegel – German philosopher (1770–1831)
- Giambattista Vico – Italian philosopher (1668–1744)
- Greedy reductionism – Kind of erroneous reductionism
- Green conservatism – Combination of conservatism and environmentalism
- Holism – Philosophical theory
- Idealism – Metaphysical position that reality is fundamentally mental
- Johann Georg Hamann – German philosopher (1730–1788)
- Johann Gottfried Herder – German philosopher, theologian, poet (1744–1803)
- Johann Wolfgang von Goethe – German writer and polymath (1749–1832)
- Neo-Luddism – Philosophy opposing modern technology
- Platonism – Philosophical system
- Politicization of science – Use of science for political purposes
- Pseudoskepticism – Position that appears to be skeptic but is actually dogmatic
- Radical environmentalism
- Reactionary – Political view advocating return to a previous societal state
- Science wars – 1990s dispute in philosophy of science
- Social Darwinism – Group of pseudoscientific theories and societal practices
- Sokal affair – 1996 scholarly publishing sting accepted by an academic journal
- Subjective idealism – Philosophy that only minds and ideas are real
- Technological dystopia – Community or society that is undesirable or frightening
- Technophobia – Fear or discomfort with technology
- William Morris – English textile artist, author, and socialist (1834–1896)
- William R. Steiger – American government official

== Bibliography ==
- A Bullock & S Trombley [Eds.], The New Fontana Dictionary of Modern Thought, third edition, London: Harper Collins, 1999
- Burger, P and Luckman, T, "The Social Construction of Reality: A Treatise" in the Sociology of Knowledge. Garden City, NY: Doubleday, 1966
- Collins, Harry and Pinch, Trevor, The Golem. What everyone should know about science, Cambridge: Cambridge University Press, 1993
- Gross, Paul R and Norman Levitt, Higher Superstition: The Academic Left and Its Quarrels with Science, Baltimore: Johns Hopkins University Press, 1994
- Gerald Holton, Science and anti-science, Harvard University Press, 1993 ISBN 0674792998
- Knorr-Cetina, Karin D, & Mulkay, Michael, Science Observed: Perspectives on the Social Study of Science, Sage Publications Ltd, 1983
- Knorr-Cetina, Karin D, Epistemic Cultures: How the Sciences Make Knowledge, Harvard University Press, 1999
- Levins, R. "Ten propositions on science and antiscience" in Social Text, 46/47:101–111, 1996.
- Levins, R. "Touch Red," in Judy Kaplan an Linn Shapiro, eds., Red Diapers: Growing up in the Communist Left, U. of Illinois, 1998, pp. 257–266.
- Levins, R. "Dialectics and systems theory" in Science and Society 62(3):373–399, 1998.
- Levins, R. "The internal and external in explanatory theories", Science as Culture, 7(4):557–582, 1998.
- Levins, R. and Lopez C. "Toward an ecosocial view of health", International Journal of Health Services 29(2):261–293, 1999.
- Nye, Andrea, Words of Power: A Feminist Reading of the History of Logic, London: Routledge, 1990
- Pepper, David, The Roots of Modern Environmentalism, London: Routledge, 1989
- Ullica Segerstrale (Ed), Beyond the Science Wars: the missing discourse about science and society, Albany: State University of New York Press, 2000, ISBN 0791446182
- Vining, Joseph, On the Future of Total Theory: Science, Antiscience, and Human Candor, Erasmus Institute papers, 1999
- Leviathan and the Air Pump Schapin and Shaffer (covers the conflict between Hobbes and Boyle).
- The Scientific Outlook by Bertrand Russell (sets out the limits of science from the perspective of a vehement campaigner against anti-science).
- An Enquiry Concerning Human Understanding by David Hume (The first major work to point out the limits of inductive reasoning, the 'new tool of science').
- Against Method by Paul Feyerabend (probably the individual most accused of reinvigorating anti-science, although some claim that he is in fact strengthening the scientific debate).
