= SecularHelp =

International organization

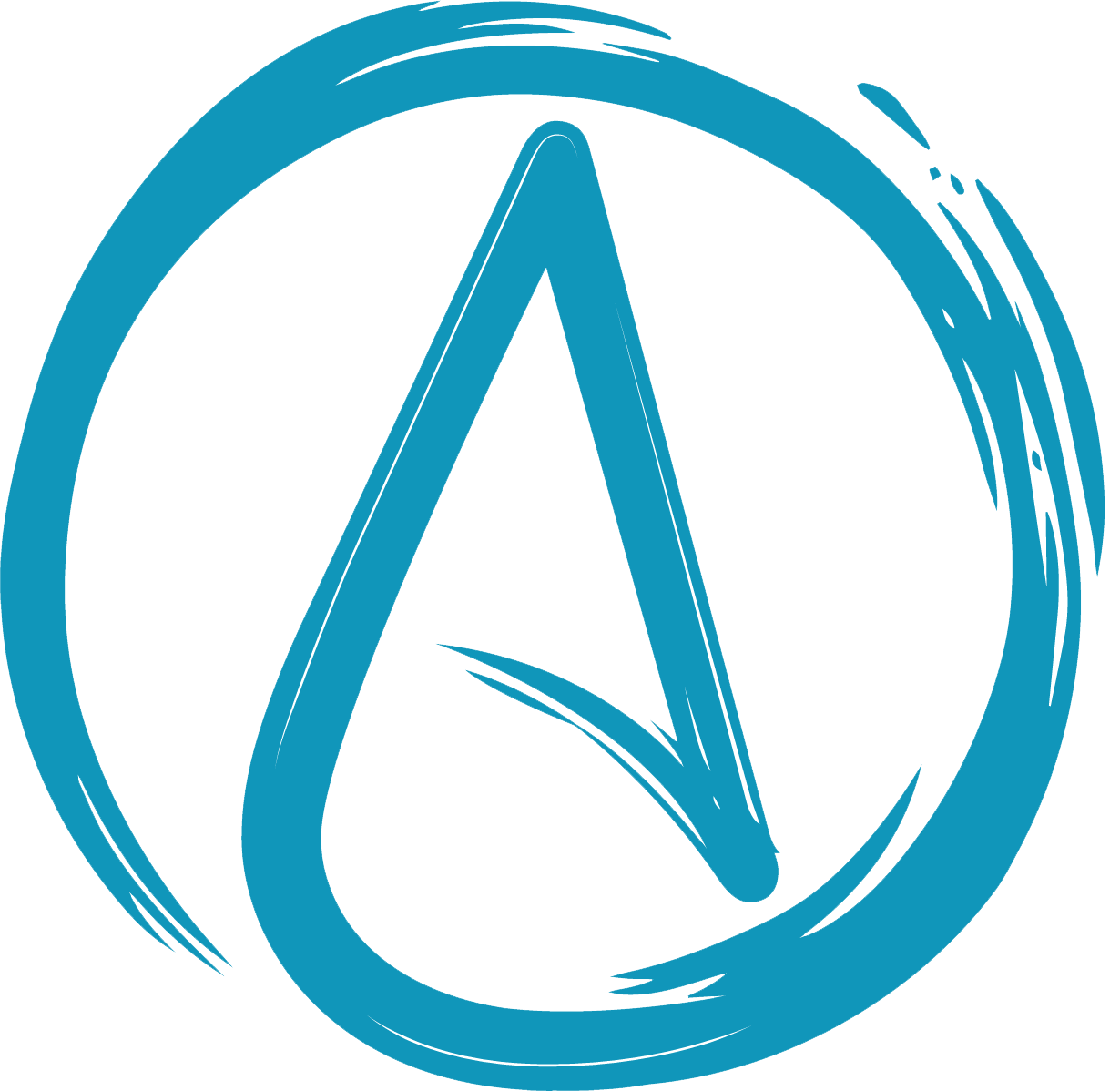
- Logo
- Formation: 1991; 35 years ago
- Type: Non-profit
- Purpose: Advocacy of atheism and secularism
- Headquarters: Sacramento, CA, United States
- Region served: Worldwide
- Official language: English
- Website: secularhelp.org

SecularHelp is a non-profit organization committed to evidence-based compassion, critical thinking, inclusivity, and ethical action. Centered on empowering people to find purpose and meaning in life while fostering secular practices and supporting secular groups and individuals with values based on secular humanism.

== History ==
SecularHelp began as Atheist Alliance and was established in 1991, incorporated August 1992, as an alliance of four American-based local atheist groups. Over time Atheist Alliance expanded, adding both local, regional groups and international groups as members. The organization changed its name to Atheist Alliance International in 2001. In 2010 and 2011, members approved the division of the American and international segments of AAI into separate organizations to accommodate each group's different strategic interests. The American group of AAI was named Atheist Alliance of America (AAoA), and the international federation reused the existing Atheist Alliance International name while forming a new foundation.

Since 2011, the Atheist Alliance of America has been a separate entity, and in 2018, the organization dissolved all prior agreements and ties with Atheist Alliance International in order to adopt an international scope. In 2022 the organization was rebranded as SecularHelp.

== Organization structure ==
As of 2025, the Board of Directors, led by President Mark W. Gura, are Derek Colanduno, Joanna Wills, Darek Dalas, Michelle W. Gura.

Past president (of AAoA) is Aron Ra.

== Publications and podcasts ==
In 2013 the organization launched the Secular Nation magazine.

In 2014 they started the Secular Nation podcast. Interviews include Aron Ra who was the President of AAoA, Margaret Downey and David Silverman.

== Conventions and conferences ==
Annual conventions are held at Dragon Con in conjunction with Skeptrack.

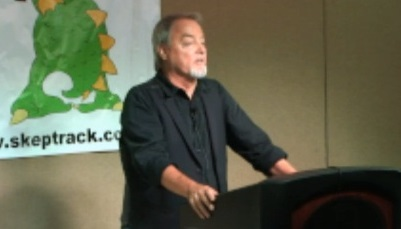
Mark Edward at Skeptrack

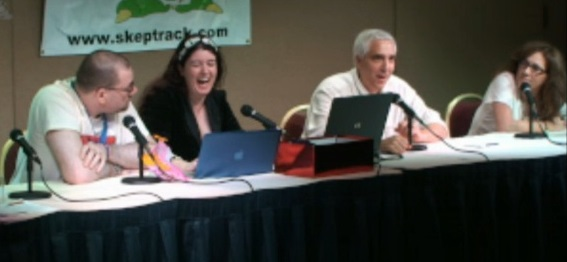
Kylie Sturgess Podcast Panel at Skeptrack 2011

During the years that the organization was under the banners of the Atheist Alliance of America and Atheist Alliance International (pre-2011), it hosted several conferences.

In 2007, the conference was held in Washington, DC, and Christopher Hitchens, Sam Harris, and Andy Thomson were among the speakers.

In 2009 the conference was held in Burbank, CA with notable speakers including Bill Maher, Richard Dawkins, Daniel Dennett, Brian Dalton (aka Mr Diety), PZ Meyers, Lawrence Krauss, Carolyn Porco, Jerry Coyne, and Eugenie Scott. Bill Maher was presented with the Richard Dawkins Award.

The final conference under the AAI name (before the organization change) was held in 2010 in Montreal, with the theme "Atheists without Borders".

In 2013 the conference saw Paula Apsell speaking and Steven Pinker getting the Richard Dawkins award.

The 2014 conference was held in Seattle. Some of the speakers included David Fitzgerald, Steven Pinker, Rebecca Goldstein, Richard Haynes and Richard Carrier. There was a last-minute change in speakers when one of the speakers, author Horus Gilgamesh (pen name) of the "Awkward Moments Not Found in Your Average Children's Bible" blog, received a death threat to his home address before the convention. Subsequently, he decided not to attend the conference.

Atlanta, Georgia was the host city for the 2015 conference.

== Awards ==
Beginning in 2003, the Atheist Alliance of America, in conjunction with the Richard Dawkins Foundation, would bestow the Richard Dawkins Award annually "to honor an outstanding atheist whose contributions raise public awareness of the nontheist life stance; who, through writings, media, the arts, film, and/or the stage, advocates increased scientific knowledge; who, through work or by example, teaches acceptance of the nontheist philosophy".

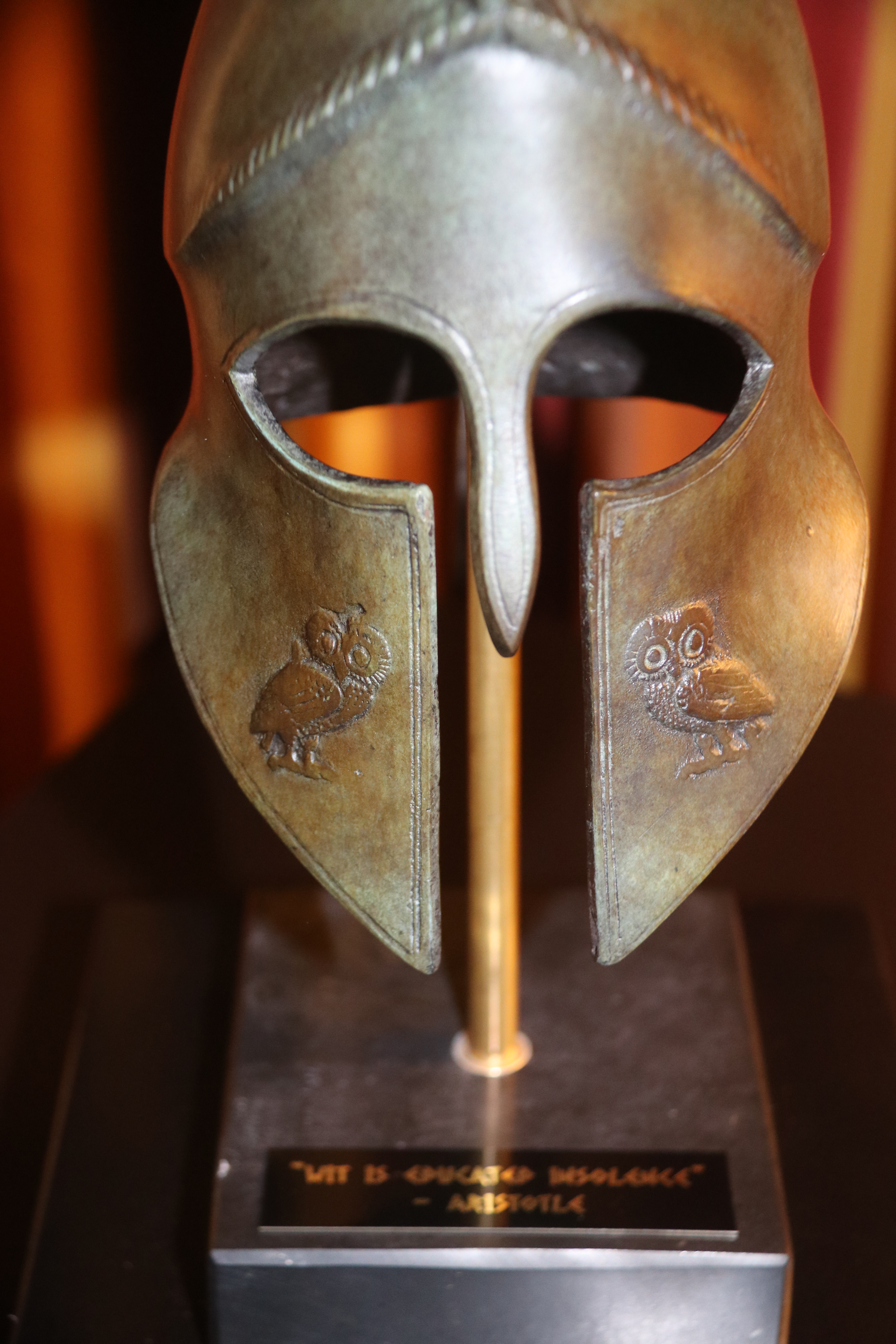
2018 Richard Dawkins Award Trophy Given to Stephen Fry

Past award recipients:
2003: James Randi
2004: Ann Druyan
2005: Penn & Teller
2006: Julia Sweeney
2007: Daniel Dennett
2008: Ayaan Hirsi Ali
2009: Bill Maher
2010: Susan Jacoby
2011: Christopher Hitchens
2012: Eugenie Scott
2013: Steven Pinker
2014: Rebecca Goldstein
2015: Jerry Coyne
2016: Lawrence Krauss
2017: David Silverman
2018: Stephen Fry

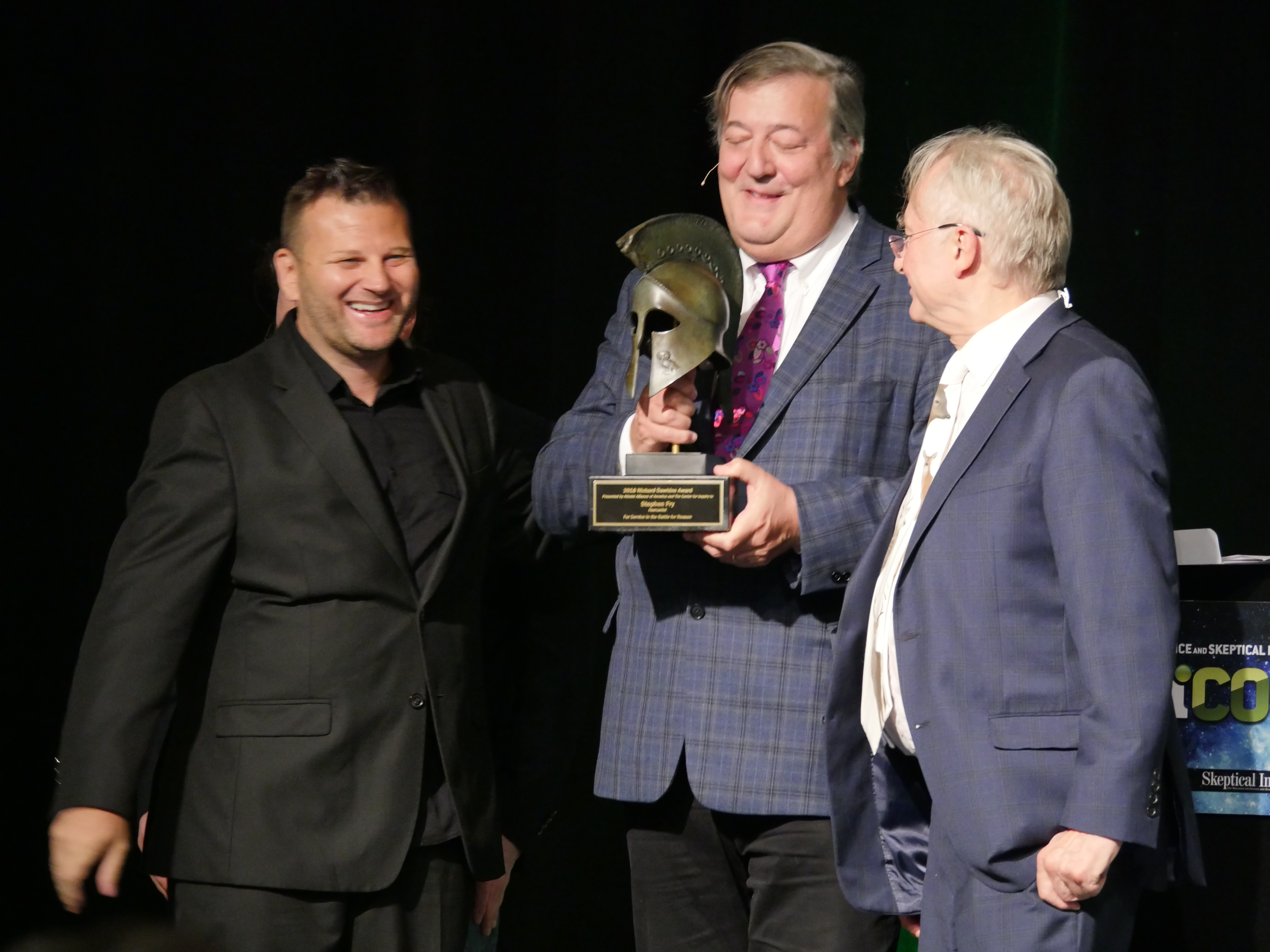
CSICon 2018 Mark W. Gura & Richard Dawkins Present Stephen Fry the 2018 Atheist Alliance Richard Dawkins Award

After 2018, the Center for Inquiry began bestowing this award.
