= Aron Ra =

American atheist activist, science communicator and podcaster

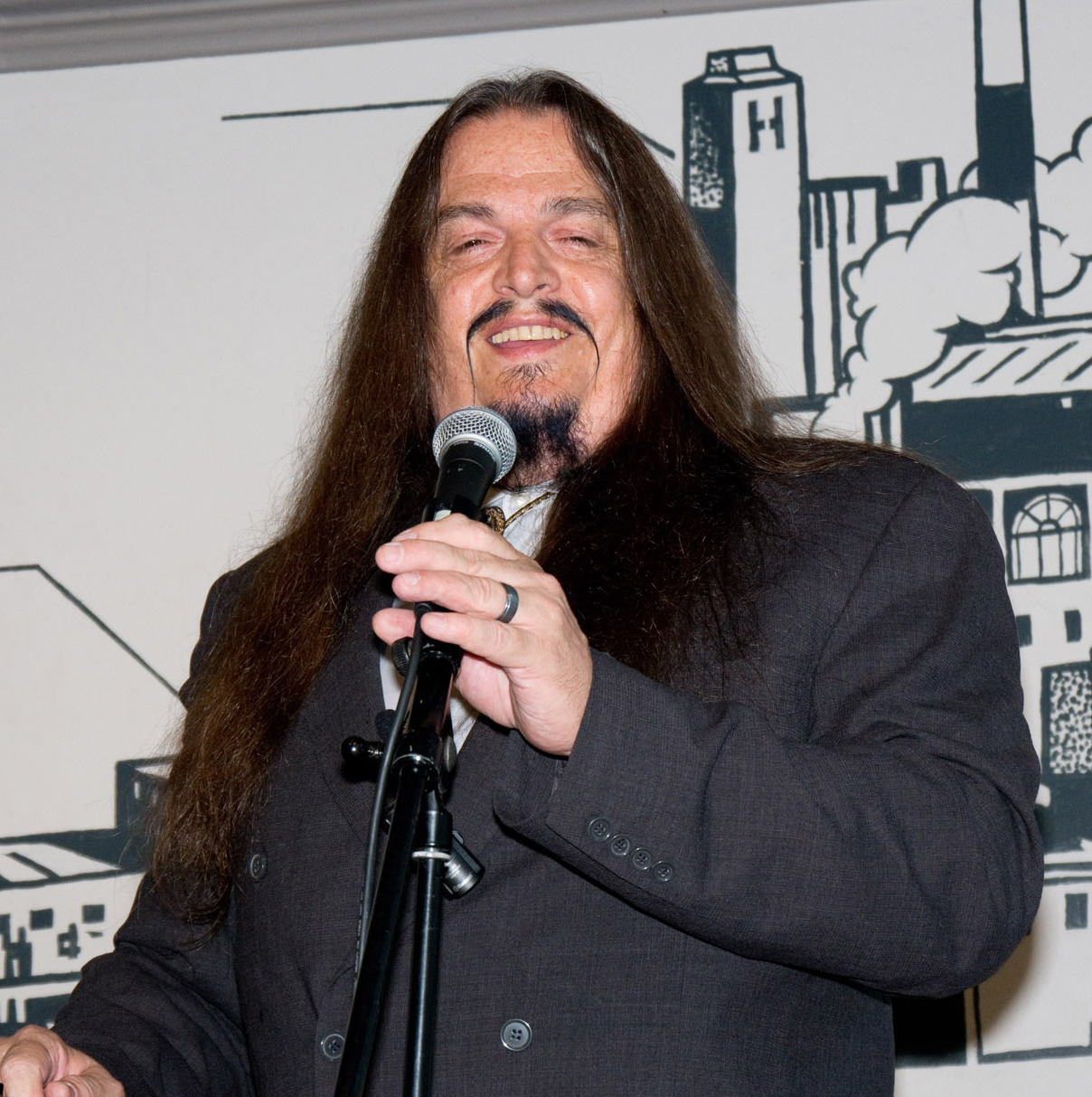
- Ra speaking at De Vrije Gedachte (The free thought), in Utrecht, Netherlands in 2015
- Born: L. Aron Nelson; October 15, 1962 (age 63); Kingman, Arizona
- Education: University of Texas at Dallas; Arizona State University (BS); Dallas College (AS)
- Occupations: Public speaker, video producer, vlogger, podcaster
- Organization(s): American Atheists, Atheist Alliance of America, Democratic Party of Texas, The Satanic Temple
- Known for: Anti-theist activism, evolution education
- Spouse: Lilandra Ra (m. 2009)
- Ra's voice On worldviews
- Website: aronra.com

Aron Ra (formerly L. Aron Nelson, born October 15, 1962) (pronounced /ərən/) is an American atheist activist. Ra is the host of the Ra-Men Podcast and a member of the American Atheists board of directors. He had previously served as president of the Atheist Alliance of America and ran as a Texas Democratic Party candidate for Texas Senate, District 2.

== Early life and education ==
Aron Ra was born in Kingman, Arizona, and baptized as a Mormon. Despite his religious upbringing, he states that he has been a skeptic since he was young.

He studied paleontology at the University of Texas in Dallas. He holds an associate's degree from Dallas College and, in 2022, earned a Bachelor of Science in Anthropology from the School of Human Evolution and Social Change at Arizona State University.

== Activist career ==
A noted anti-theist and educational activist, Ra is a vocal critic of theism and creationism and an advocate of the inclusion of evolution in science curricula. Ra produces YouTube videos on the topics of evolution, skepticism, free thought, and atheism. He is a regional director for American Atheists and is also the director of the Phylogeny Explorer Project.

Ra has engaged in live debates with young Earth creationists, including Ray Comfort, and presented at skepticism conferences in Europe. As a member of the Unholy Trinity, he toured the United States and Australia with two fellow atheist activists—Seth Andrews of The Thinking Atheist, and Matt Dillahunty formerly of The Atheist Experience.

He appeared in the documentary films My Week in Atheism, directed by John Christy, and Batman & Jesus, directed by Jozef K. Richards. He published his first book, Foundational Falsehoods of Creationism, in 2016. He is the host of the Ra-Men podcast.

== Political candidacy and views ==
In March 2017, Ra resigned from his position as president of the Atheist Alliance of America to run for the Texas State Senate against Republican incumbent Bob Hall. The first Democratic candidate to run for the District 2 seat since 2002, he dropped out of the race after failing to secure the Democratic Party's endorsement.

Politically, Ra identifies as a liberal, leftist, and feminist. In February 2022, Ra identified himself as a Satanist.

== Books ==
- Foundational Falsehoods of Creationism (2016)
- We Are All Apes (2022)
