= Apostacon =

Annual freethought conference

- Status: Active
- Genre: atheism, freethought, humanism, secularism and skepticism
- Locations: Lincoln, Nebraska (2009–2010); Omaha, Nebraska (2011–2014); Irving, Texas (2015)
- Country: United States
- Inaugurated: 2009
- Attendance: 450 (2014)
- Organizer: Lincoln Secular Humanists (AHA chapter) (2009–2010)

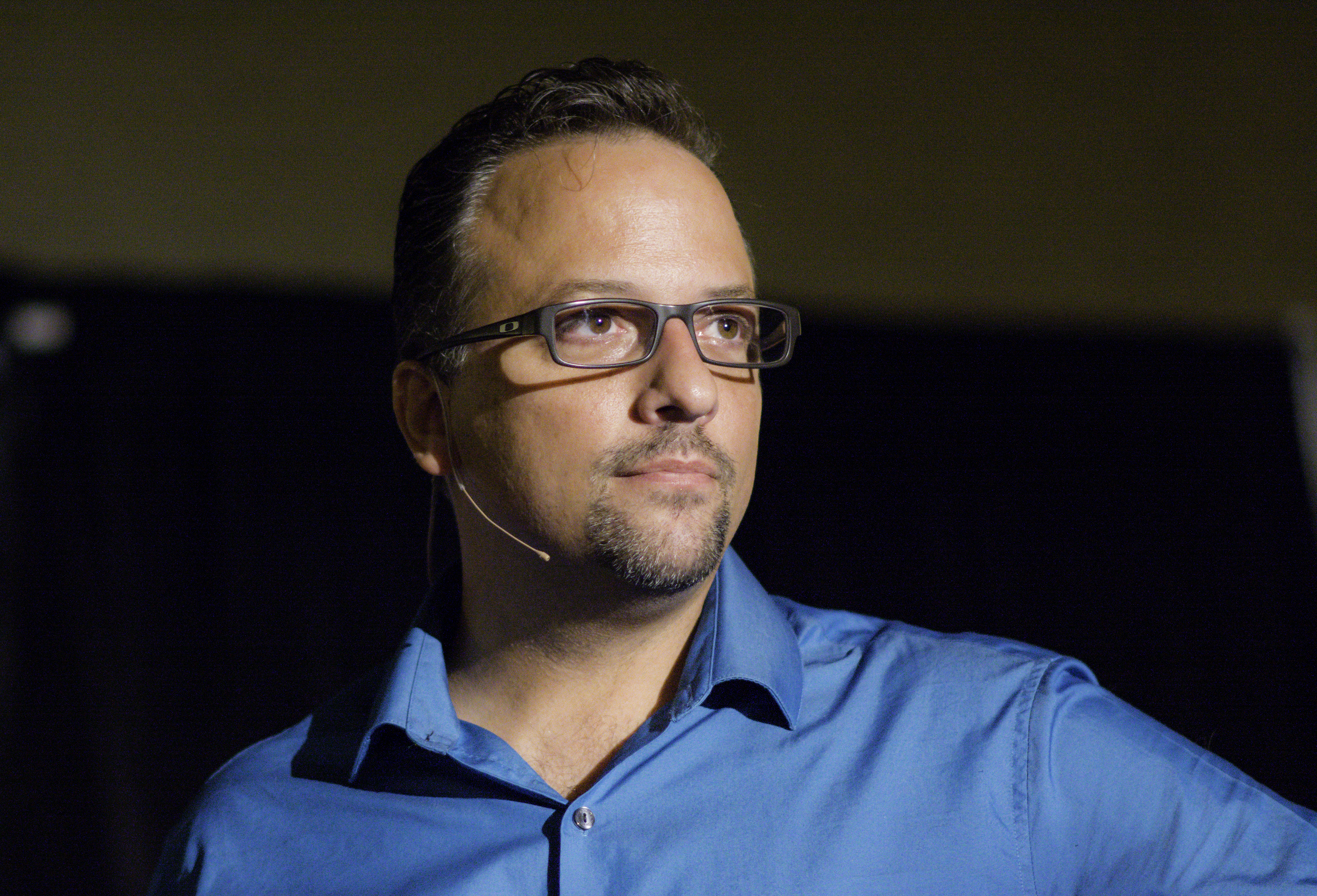
Seth Andrews, host of The Thinking Atheist podcast, at Apostacon 2014

Apostacon (portmanteau of "apostate" + "conference"), before 2013 known as Midwest Humanist Conference, Midwest Humanist and Freethought Conference and Midwest Freethought Conference, is an annual event about atheism, freethought, humanism, secularism and skepticism in the (Midwestern) United States. The conference, which embraces the parody religion of the Flying Spaghetti Monster, is aimed at "atheists, humanists, agnostics, skeptics, apostates, freethinkers, rationalists and pastafarians."

== History ==
The 2009 event was held at the University of Nebraska–Lincoln (UNL), hosted by the Lincoln Secular Humanists and coordinated by Humanist and LGBT activist Jason Frye. Speakers lectured on topics ranging from reproductive rights and LGBT rights to community building. In 2010, the second conference themed “No God, No Problem” was again coordinated by Frye, but this time held in the Country Inn & Suites in Lincoln, Nebraska; there were 80 attendees. From 2011 until 2014, the conference was held in Omaha, Nebraska. During Apostacon 2014, famous science communicator and astrophysicist Neil deGrasse Tyson delivered the keynote address. The 2015 installment was held in Dallas, Texas, the first time outside of Nebraska.

In October 2015 Apostacon president Sarah Morehead was removed by the executive board for allegedly defrauding the conference.

Event	Date	Location	Notes
Midwest Humanist Conference	August 15, 2009	Lincoln, Nebraska	At the University of Nebraska–Lincoln.
Midwest Humanist Conference II	August 22, 2010	Lincoln, Nebraska	Theme: "No God, No Problems". 80 attendees.
Midwest Humanist and Freethought Conference	August 12–14, 2011	Omaha, Nebraska	Speakers included Greta Christina, Brian Keith Dalton, Fred Edwords, Hemant Mehta and Jennifer McCreight.
Midwest Freethought Conference	August 3–5, 2012	Omaha, Nebraska	Speakers included PZ Myers, Brian Dunning, Dan Barker, Hemant Mehta, Jerry DeWitt and Fred Edwords.
Apostacon	September 20–22, 2013	Omaha, Nebraska	Speakers included Hector Avalos, Dan Barker, Jamila Bey, Richard Dawkins (via Skype), Matt Dillahunty, Fred Edwords, Sean Faircloth, Nathan Phelps, Darrel Ray and David Silverman.
Apostacon 2014	September 19–21, 2014	Omaha, Nebraska	Theme: "Exercise Your Noodle And "Meat" New Friends!" Speakers included Dale McGowan, David Fitzgerald, Lawrence M. Krauss, Cara Santa Maria, Neil deGrasse Tyson, Matt Dillahunty, Margaret Downey, Nathan Phelps, Darrel Ray and David Silverman. 450 attendees.
Apostacon 2015	September 18–20, 2015	Irving, Texas	Theme: "The Sauciest Freethought Conference in the Noodleverse!" Scheduled speakers include: Ryan J. Bell, Matt Dillahunty, Margaret Downey, David Fitzgerald and Penn & Teller.
Apostacon 2016	September 17–18, 2016	Omaha, Nebraska	Theme: "The Mother of All Meat Balls"

== See also ==
- List of skeptical conferences
