= Richard Dawkins Award =

Award given to individuals for secularist and rationalist advocacy

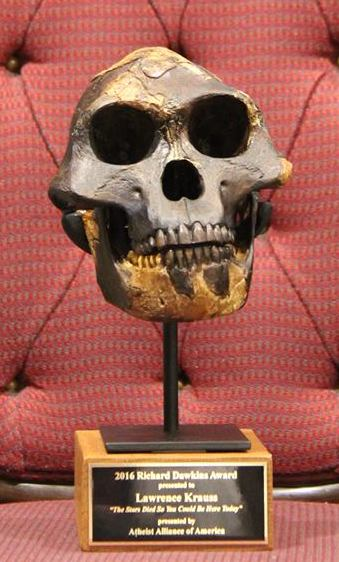
- The 2016 Richard Dawkins Award, presented to Lawrence Krauss
- Awarded for: Publicly proclaiming "the values of secularism and rationalism, upholding scientific truth wherever it may lead."
- Presented by: Center for Inquiry
- First award: 2003; 23 years ago
- Currently held by: 21 individuals
- Website: centerforinquiry.org

The Richard Dawkins Award is an annual prize awarded by the Center for Inquiry (CFI). It was established in 2003 and was initially awarded by the Atheist Alliance of America coordinating with Richard Dawkins and the Richard Dawkins Foundation for Reason and Science. In 2019, the award was formally moved to CFI. CFI is a US nonprofit organization whose stated mission is to "foster a secular society based on reason, science, freedom of inquiry, and humanist values". The award was initially presented by the Atheist Alliance of America to honor an "outstanding atheist", who taught or advocated scientific knowledge and acceptance of nontheism, and raised public awareness. The award is currently presented by the Center for Inquiry to an individual associated with science, scholarship, education, or entertainment, and who "publicly proclaims the values of secularism and rationalism, upholding scientific truth wherever it may lead." They state that the recipient must be approved by Dawkins himself.

The Richard Dawkins Award is named in honor of the British evolutionary biologist. In a 2013 poll conducted by Prospect magazine, Dawkins was ranked first in the list of "world thinkers" rankings. He is famous for his atheistic beliefs, and has written books including The God Delusion and Outgrowing God: A Beginner's Guide. The first Richard Dawkins Award was received by James Randi, a magician who investigated and debunked various paranormal claims. In 2005, Penn Jillette and Teller, jointly as Penn & Teller, received the award. In 2009, Bill Maher received the award for his film Religulous; oncologist David Gorski called the decision "inappropriate" due to Maher's views on vaccines and criticism of evidence-based medicine. In 2020, Javed Akhtar became the first Indian to receive the award. In 2021, Tim Minchin received the award. In 2022, Neil deGrasse Tyson received the award saying it was an honor that he would hold above all others.

== List of recipients ==
List of recipients of the Richard Dawkins Award
Year	Portrait	Name	Notes (Note: No official citation for the award has been provided by the Atheist Alliance of America or by the Center for Inquiry. This column broadly outlines the work and views of the recipient.)	Ref(s).
2003	Photographic portrait of James Randi	James Randi	Randi was a magician who investigated and debunked mind-reading, ghost whispering, fortune-telling, and other paranormal claims. Professionally known as "Amazing Randi", he was a recipient of the MacArthur award.	
2004	Photographic portrait of Ann Druyan	Ann Druyan	Druyan is a film producer, director, lecturer, and a writer. She is an agnostic, and asserts that religious faith is "antithetical to the values of science".	
2005	Photographic portrait of Penn Jillette (right) and Teller (left)	Penn & Teller	Penn Jillette and Teller, jointly known as Penn & Teller, are an Emmy Award–winning magician duo. Both identify as atheists.	
2006	Photographic portrait of Julia Sweeney	Julia Sweeney	Sweeney is an actor and writer, notable for her work in Saturday Night Live. She has written My Beautiful Loss of Faith Story explaining her atheism.	
2007	Photographic portrait of Daniel Dennett	Daniel Dennett	Dennett served as a professor and the director of the Center for Cognitive Studies at Tufts University. He has authored various books including Consciousness Explained, Darwin's Dangerous Idea, and Kinds of Minds. He argues that we "must not preserve the myth of God – it was a useful crutch, but we've outgrown it."	
2008	Photographic portrait of Ayaan Hirsi Ali	Ayaan Hirsi Ali	Ali is a Somalian immigrant who served as a member of the Dutch Parliament. She is a former Muslim converted to atheism, and a vocal critic of the Quran. In 2023, Ali converted from atheism to Christianity and is still critical of Islam and the Quran.	
2009	Photographic portrait of Bill Maher	Bill Maher	Maher is a political satirist and the host of Real Time with Bill Maher. He starred in the 2008 film Religulous, which the Richard Dawkins Foundation for Reason and Science referred to as "the most prominent film against religion in the United States" of 2008.	
2010	Photographic portrait of Susan Jacoby	Susan Jacoby	Jacoby is an author and a Pulitzer Prize finalist. She is an atheist, and has authored various books, including The Age of American Unreason and Strange Gods: A Secular History of Conversion.	
2011	Photographic portrait of Christopher Hitchens	Christopher Hitchens	Hitchens was a journalist who authored the book God Is Not Great, which writer Susan Sontag called "the small world of those who till the field of ideas".	
2012	Photographic portrait of Eugenie Scott	Eugenie Scott	Scott is an anthropologist who served as the director of the National Center for Science Education. She is an atheist.	
2013	Photographic portrait of Steven Pinker	Steven Pinker	Pinker is a linguist, psychologist, and a professor at Harvard University; he has authored How The Mind Works. He is an atheist.	
2014	Photographic portrait of Rebecca Goldstein	Rebecca Goldstein	Goldstein is an author with a Ph.D. in philosophy. She is a recipient of the 2014 National Humanities Medal. She authored the fiction book 36 Arguments for the Existence of God, which The Guardian writer Jonathan Beckman referred to as “[mocking] the delusions of both the godly and the godless".	
2015	Photographic portrait of Jerry Coyne	Jerry Coyne	Coyne is a professor of Ecology and Evolution at the University of Chicago. He is a supporter of evolution, and asserts that "belief in God is [...] detrimental, even dangerous, and fundamentally incompatible with science."	
2016	Photographic portrait of Lawrence Krauss	Lawrence Krauss	Krauss is an American-Canadian physicist. He has been referred to by Melissa Pugh, then president of Atheist Alliance of America, as a "passionate advocate of atheism and reason known throughout the world".	
2017	Photographic portrait of David Silverman	David Silverman	Silverman is an American who has served as the president of the American Atheists organization. The Washington Post referred to him as one of America's "most prominent atheists".	
2018	Photographic portrait of Stephen Fry	Stephen Fry	Fry is a British comedian, actor, and an activist who received the award because of "his role in the world of skepticism, atheism, rationalism."	
2019	Photographic portrait of Ricky Gervais	Ricky Gervais	Gervais is a British comedian, screenwriter, and actor, known for his critical thinking, rationalism, and secularism.	
2020	Photographic portrait of Javed Akhtar	Javed Akhtar	Akhtar is a poet and lyricist, who is the first Indian to receive the award. He received the award for "critical thinking, holding religious dogma up to scrutiny, advancing human progress and humanist values."	
2021	Photographic portrait of Tim Minchin	Tim Minchin	Minchin is a musician and comedian, who received the award for "inspiring a global audience to find joy in reason, science, and skepticism."	
2022	Photographic portrait of Neil deGrasse Tyson	Neil deGrasse Tyson	Tyson is an American astrophysicist, author, and science communicator. Since 1996, he has been the director of the Hayden Planetarium at the Rose Center for Earth and Space in New York City.	
2023	Photographic portrait of Bill Nye	Bill Nye	Bill Nye is an American mechanical engineer, science communicator, and television presenter. He is best known as the host of the science education television show Bill Nye the Science Guy (1993–1999) and as a science educator in pop culture.	
2024	Photographic portrait of Brian Cox	Brian Cox	Brian Cox is a British physicist, best known for his pop science books and as a presenter of science programs on television.	
2025	Is Technology Enriching Language - b - John McWhorter 2017	John McWhorter	John McWhorter is an acclaimed author, academic, commentator, and open atheist. He teaches linguistics, Western civilization, and music history at Columbia University.	
2026	Photographic portrait of Sam Harris	Sam Harris	Sam Harris is an American neuroscientist, philosopher, author, and podcast host. His work touches on a range of topics, including rationality, religion, ethics, free will, determinism, neuroscience, meditation, psychedelics, philosophy of mind, politics, terrorism, and artificial intelligence.	

== See also ==
- List of religion-related awards
