= Susan Jacoby =

American author (born 1945)

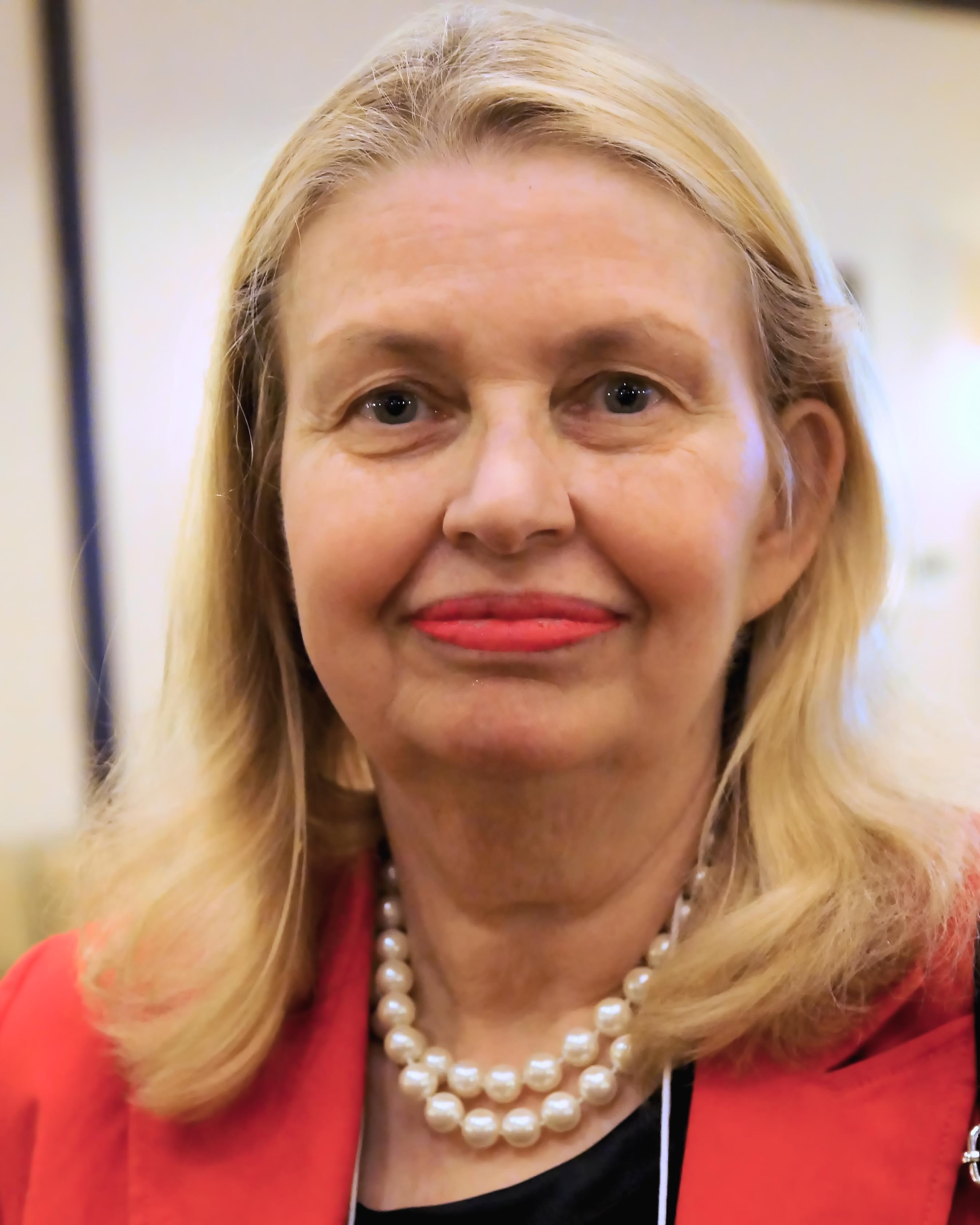
- Jacoby in 2012
- Born: June 4, 1945 (age 81); Okemos, Michigan, U.S.
- Education: Michigan State University
- Occupation: author
- Notable work: Wild Justice, The Age of American Unreason, Alger Hiss and The Battle for History, Never Say Die: The Myth and Marketing of the New Old Age, Freethinkers: A History of American Secularism
- Awards: Guggenheim Fellowship, National Endowment for the Humanities Fellowship, and a fellowship from the New York Public Library's Dorothy and Lewis B. Cullman Center for Scholars and Writers
- Website: www.susanjacoby.co

Susan Jacoby (/dʒəˈkoʊbi/; born June 4, 1945) is an American author. Her 2008 book about American anti-intellectualism, The Age of American Unreason, was a New York Times best seller. She is an atheist and a secularist. Jacoby graduated from Michigan State University in 1965. She lives in New York City.

== Life and career ==
Jacoby, who began her career as a reporter for The Washington Post, has been a contributor to a variety of national publications, including The New York Times, the Los Angeles Times, The American Prospect, Mother Jones, The Nation, Glamour, and the AARP Bulletin and AARP: The Magazine. She is currently a panelist for "On Faith," a Washington Post-Newsweek blog on religion. As a young reporter she lived for two years in the USSR.

Raised in a Catholic home (her mother was from an Irish Catholic family), Jacoby was 24 before she learned that her father, Robert, had been born into a Jewish family. Jacoby explored these roots in her 2000 book Half-Jew: A Daughter's Search for Her Family's Buried Past. (Robert Jacoby's brother was the great bridge player Oswald Jacoby.)

Her book Freethinkers: A History of American Secularism was named a notable book of 2004 by The Washington Post and The New York Times. It was also named an Outstanding International Book of the Year by The Times Literary Supplement (London) and The Guardian. Wild Justice: The Evolution of Revenge (1984) was a finalist for the Pulitzer Prize. Jacoby also won an Alicia Patterson Journalism Fellowship in 1974 to research and write about the new Americans: immigration into the U.S.

In The Age of American Unreason (2008) Jacoby contends that the dumbing down of America, which she describes as "a virulent mixture of anti-rationalism and low expectations", is more a permanent state than a temporary one whose basis is the top down influence of false populist politicians striving to be seen as approachable instead of intelligent. She writes that the increasing use of colloquial and casual language in official speech, such as referring to everyone as "folks", is "symptomatic of a debasement of public speech inseparable from a more general erosion of American cultural standards" and "conveys an implicit denial of the seriousness of whatever issue is being debated: talking about folks going off to war is the equivalent of describing rape victims as girls."

In February 2010, she was named to the Freedom From Religion Foundation's Honorary Board of distinguished achievers. Also in 2010, she was awarded the Richard Dawkins Award by Atheist Alliance International.

=== Ideas ===
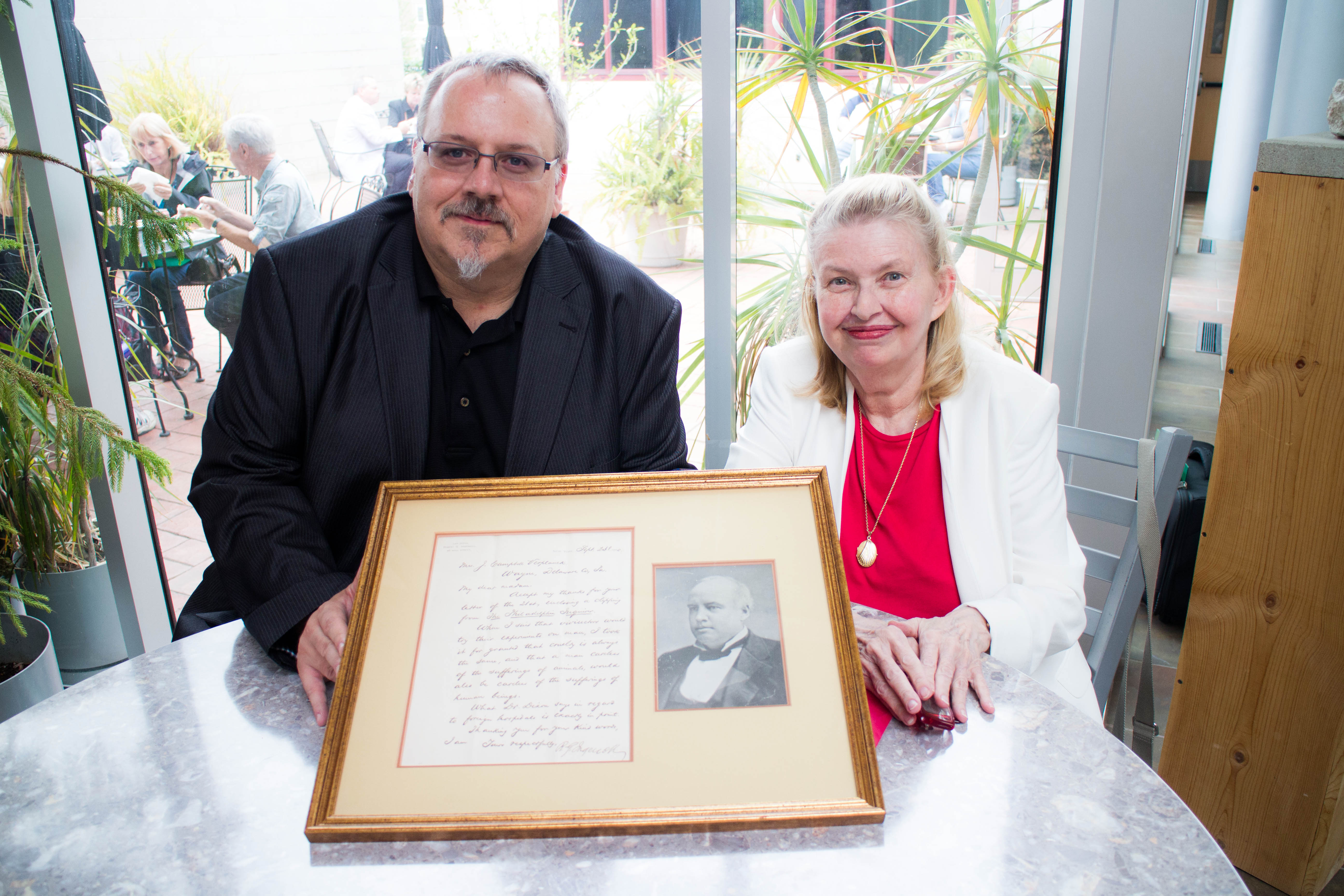
Center for Inquiry Libraries Director Tim Binga and Susan Jacoby display a letter in Robert G. Ingersoll's hand.

Jacoby has spoken about the important role secularism played in the development of political and social events in the history of the United States, and she has argued that this fact is often written out of American history by the religious right. One of the most important events in which Jacoby believes secularism played an enormous part was the writing of the United States Constitution. She has explained that it is a false claim that the founders of the United States intended the government to be religious. She believes instead that they were strongly in favor of the separation of Church and State, and that they purposely omitted the word God from the Constitution, partly influenced by the horrors that occurred in places such as France under non-secular rule, as well as inspired by the ideas of the Age of Enlightenment.

The idea that a secular government is, in fact, necessary for the existence of religious liberty, has also been defended by Susan Jacoby. She has suggested that the religiosity of the American people, as well as the proliferation of different religious denominations in the United States, are examples of situations that have occurred precisely thanks to the existence of a secular system. Jacoby has said that the separation of church and state offered people the possibility to disagree with their church without having to oppose the established political order, which would have been impossible under a system where church and state were united.

Jacoby has pointed out that the presence of some religious elements in the governmental scene of the United States is a matter of customs and not of laws, and that many of those elements are more recent than people tend to believe. She has cited as an example the Pledge of Allegiance, only written in 1892 and which did not include the expression 'Under God' until 1954. These words were added with the sole purpose of distinguishing the American government from the Soviet one, which was considered atheist.

The influence of secularism in the Civil Rights Movement in the United States is another important subject for Jacoby. She believes that accepting the importance of secularism in the civil rights movement does not deny the role religion played in it, and while she has admitted that "the driving force in the early civil rights movement were the black churches of the South", she has also pointed out that the movement was not intrinsically religious, and that in fact, the white churches of the South were strongly opposed to it.

Susan Jacoby has also highlighted the link and similarities between secularism and feminism. She has noticed that both movements gain and lose strength throughout history and are constantly renewed or revived by later generations. She has used as an example the case of Thomas Paine, whose ideas were prominent in the 18th century but which were almost forgotten by later generations until the last quarter of the 19th century, when they were revived by Robert G. Ingersoll.

According to Jacoby, secularism is also important in feminism because the latter implies dealing with "overturning ideas that very conservative religions, and many parts of the Bible, have proclaimed about women for thousands of years".

Jacoby has argued that the idea of anti-Catholicism being "a significant force in American life today is a complete canard, perpetrated by theologically and politically right-wing Roman Catholics . . . and aimed at anyone who stands up to the Church's continuing attempts to impose its values on all Americans."

== Books ==
- Moscow Conversations (1972)
- The Friendship Barrier: Ten Russian Encounters (1972, British edition)
- Inside Soviet Schools (1974)
- The Possible She (1979)
- Wild Justice: The Evolution of Revenge (1983)
- Soul to Soul: A Black Russian American Family, 1865-1992 (with Yelena Khanga) (1994)
- Half-Jew: A Daughter's Search for Her Family's Buried Past (2000)
- Freethinkers: A History of American Secularism (2004)
- The Age of American Unreason, Pantheon (2008)
- Alger Hiss and the Battle for History (2009)
- Never Say Die (2011)
- The Great Agnostic: Robert Ingersoll and American Freethought (2013)
- Strange Gods: A Secular History of Conversion (2016)
- Why Baseball Matters (2018)

== See also ==
- List of atheist authors
- Freethought
