= 40 Days and 40 Nights (book) =

2007 book by Matthew Chapman

- Cover of the first edition
- Author: Matthew Chapman
- Language: English
- Subject: Kitzmiller v. Dover Area School District
- Published: 2007 (Harper (first edition))
- Publication place: United States
- Media type: Print (hardcover and paperback)
- Pages: 288
- ISBN: 978-0061179457

40 Days and 40 Nights: Darwin, Intelligent Design, God, OxyContin, and Other Oddities on Trial in Pennsylvania is a 2007 non-fiction book about the Kitzmiller v. Dover Area School District trial of 2005. Author Matthew Chapman, a journalist, screenwriter and director (and the great-great-grandson of Charles Darwin) reported on the trial for Harper's magazine.

== Reception ==
Austin Cline of About.com gave the book four-and-a-half-stars-out-of-five rating, stating: "There are bound to be many books written about this trial and I don't know if Chapman's will be the best source of information — either about the trial itself or the larger issues involved. It will, however, almost certainly stand out as one of the most enjoyable and entertaining to read."

John Dupuis of ScienceBlogs gave the book a positive review, saying that "Chapman uses some of the same strategies in the Dover as he did in the first book on the Scopes Trial. He tells the story of the trial as a story about people: the lawyers, the defendants, the townspeople, the media. And a colourful lot they were, making those aspects of the book very entertaining and compelling. The weakness of the book is related to those colourful characters — the chronicle of the trial itself never really seemed to come alive for me in the same way that his telling of the Scopes trial did."
