= Matthew Chapman (author) =

English screenwriter and director

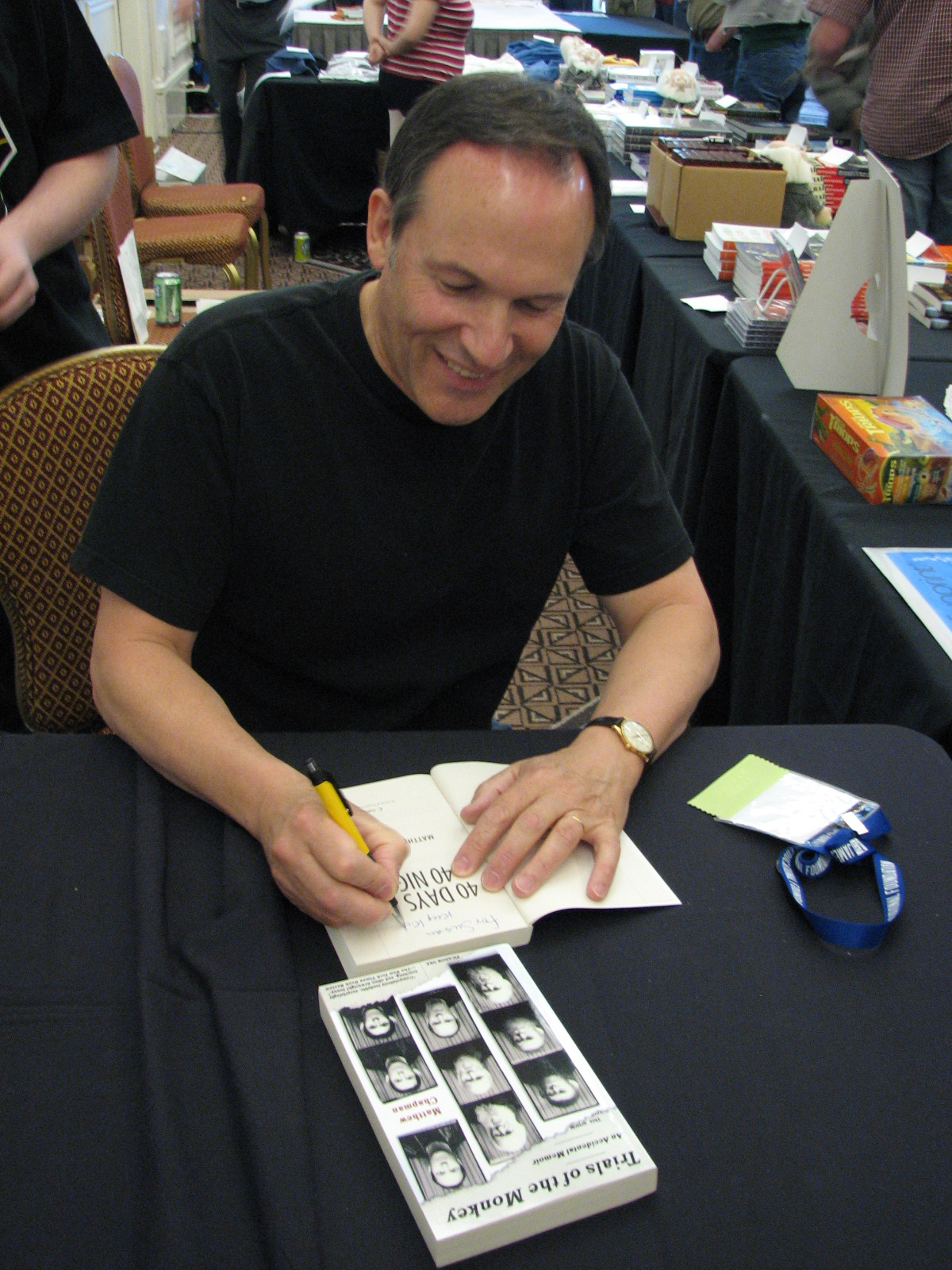
- Born: Matthew H. D. Chapman; 1950 (age 75–76); Cambridge, England
- Citizenship: American
- Occupations: Writer, film director, journalist
- Spouse: Denise Dumont (m. 1989)
- Relatives: Charles Darwin, F. M. Cornford, Frances Cornford

Matthew H. D. Chapman is an English-American journalist, author, screenwriter, director and science activist. As the great-great-grandson of Charles Darwin, he has had a particular interest in the American creationism versus evolution controversy. He has written and directed six films, written two books and numerous screenplays, had articles published in Harper's Magazine and National Geographic among others, and blogged for the Huffington Post.

== Family and education ==
Matthew Chapman grew up in an English family that attended church and his parents sent him to "schools that mandated daily prayers." His father, Cecil Chapman, was the son of the noted physicist and astronomer, Sydney Chapman, responsible for early research on the nature of the ozone layer. His mother, Clare, was the daughter of the philosophy professor and author Francis Cornford and poet Frances Cornford (née Darwin), the daughter of Francis Darwin.

Growing up in Cambridge, England, Chapman did not give much consideration to the fact that he was the great-great grandson of Charles Darwin. He did feel the pressure to be an academic success. However, he was "a boy who refused to be educated and was kicked out of several schools." Chapman left school at age fifteen. After that, he held various jobs until landing an apprenticeship as a film editor.

== Religious views ==
According to his book Trials of the Monkey—An Accidental Memoir, Chapman began praying nightly at the age of 7. As fodder for his lengthy prayer sessions, he found magazine and newspaper articles provided "an endless and astonishing vein of human misery from which to mine the elements for [his] nightly pleas." This awareness of human suffering led him to consider becoming a missionary to help others. He decided to read the entire Bible as a first step toward that goal.

When he had read as far as the Book of Leviticus, he was dismayed to discover that God tells Moses to kill homosexual men. At that point in his life, Chapman found his gay uncle, Ben Duncan, and his partner to be "the only truly civilized and loving couple [he] knew." By the age of 9, Chapman had discovered that Leviticus 20:13 was often used by clergy and politicians to justify the incarceration of men like his uncle.

In the 1980's, Chapman moved to the US and became aware of believers in creationism challenging schools over teaching evolution. His interest in this issue grew and led him to write his first book in 2001, Trials of the Monkey—An Accidental Memoir.

== Kitzmiller vs. Dover ==
In 2005, Harper's Magazine asked Matthew Chapman to cover the Kitzmiller v. Dover Area School District case. In that court case, eleven parents successfully sued the school district to prevent creationism (also called intelligent design) from getting equal footing with instruction on evolution in science classes taken by 9th graders. The ruling in the case, issued by Republican Judge John Jones, reprimanded "the [Christian] fundamentalists and their scientific supporters for their intellectual dishonesty.”

During the trial, a journalism colleague from a Harrisburg newspaper reported on the fact that Matthew Chapman was a descendent of Charles Darwin. This led to Chapman being "invited to homes and churches in the area to talk about [his] views, and on a couple of occasions to endure attempts at conversion." He encountered many people who, having been indoctrinated with religious beliefs from childhood, would "choose faith no matter how good the contradictory evidence was." Chapman says that when he left Pennsylvania after the conclusion of the trial, his "journey to atheism [was] complete."

Chapman's experiences covering the Dover trial led him to write his second book, 40 Days and 40 Nights – Darwin, Intelligent Design, God, OxyContin, and Other Oddities on Trial in Pennsylvania, published in 2007.

== Film writing and direction ==
Chapman's most-famous film, The Ledge, which he wrote and directed, starred Charlie Hunnam, Liv Tyler, Terrence Howard, and Patrick Wilson. The film deals with an intellectual, personal, and ultimately fatal feud between an atheist and an evangelical Christian. An atheist on a ledge is forced to decide whether to die or to see someone he loves killed. According to Chapman, it is "a piece of work that makes the basic intellectual arguments for atheism, but also makes a powerful emotional argument against cruelty of a religious kind" and the "ways people suffer as a result".

== ScienceDebate.org ==
Matthew Chapman founded ScienceDebate.org in 2007. His co-founders were fellow screenwriter Shawn Lawrence Otto, science writer Chris Mooney, marine biologist and science blogger Sheril Kirshenbaum, physicist Lawrence Krauss, and philosopher Austin Dacey.

The inspiration for starting Science Debate was Chapman noticing that many of the questions asked of candidates leading up to the 2008 U.S. presidential election focused on values and faith. Chapman felt that including the reality of science policies and the consequences for voters should be addressed as well. During that campaign season, Science Debates was able to obtain responses to 14 science-related questions from candidates Hillary Clinton, Barack Obama, and John McCain. Similar questionnaires, with up to 20 questions, were given to the final candidates in the 2012 and 2016 elections. In an interview just prior to the 2016 election, Matthew Chapman stated that the Science Debate questions had become "part of the political fabric of getting elected." He hoped that presidential candidates debating science policy would become more important than economic and foreign policy issues. In 2023, Science Debate was rebranded under the name Science on the Ballot and became part of the National Science Policy Network (NSPN).

== Debate appearance ==
On 15 November 2011, Matthew Chapman participated in a debate hosted by Open to Debate moderated by John Donvan. Chapman, along with A.C. Grayling, were proponents of the debate topic "the world would be better off without religion." Their opponents were Dinesh D'Souza and Rabbi David Wolpe. The audience in attendance at the debate were polled before and after the debate. Prior to the debate, 52% agreed with the motion, 26% were opposed and 22% were undecided. After the debate, 59% supported the claim that the world would be better off without religion, 31% opposed it, and 10% remained undecided. Since the increase in proponents was greater than that in opponents, Chapman and Grayling were declared the winners of the debate.

In his closing summary of the debate, Matthew Chapman contrasted the social benefits of science and religion. He pointed out that scientific knowledge has lengthened human lifespans and eliminated diseases in only the past century while "religion has had thousands of years to prove its supernatural effectiveness" with no demonstrable results. If religion had a positive effect on human behavior, then "markers of social dysfunction...would be much lower in highly religious societies." Yet, he concluded, the exact opposite is true, with incarceration and teen pregnancy rates being much higher in the highly religious United States than they are in the more secular nations in Europe.

== Books ==
- Trials of the Monkey: An Accidental Memoir (Picador, 5 July 2002) ISBN 0-312-30078-6
- 40 Days and 40 Nights: Darwin, Intelligent Design, God, OxyContin, and Other Oddities on Trial in Pennsylvania. (Harper Collins, 10 April 2007) ISBN 0-06-117945-0

== Filmography ==
- Hussy (1980) (screenplay, director)
- Strangers Kiss (1983) (screenplay, director)
- Slow Burn (1986) (screenplay, director)
- Heart of Midnight (1988) (screenplay, director)
- A Grande Arte (1991) (additional dialogue) (screenplay: English version)
- Consenting Adults (1992) (screenplay)
- Color of Night (1994) (screenplay)
- What's the Worst That Could Happen? (2001) (screenplay)
- Runaway Jury (2003) (screenplay)
- Black Water Transit (2009) (screenplay)
- The Ledge (2011) (screenplay, director)
- Reaching for the Moon (2013) (screenplay)
- "The American Guest" (2021) (screenplay) 4-hour limited series on HBO/HBO Max
