= Seth Andrews =

American atheism activist and author

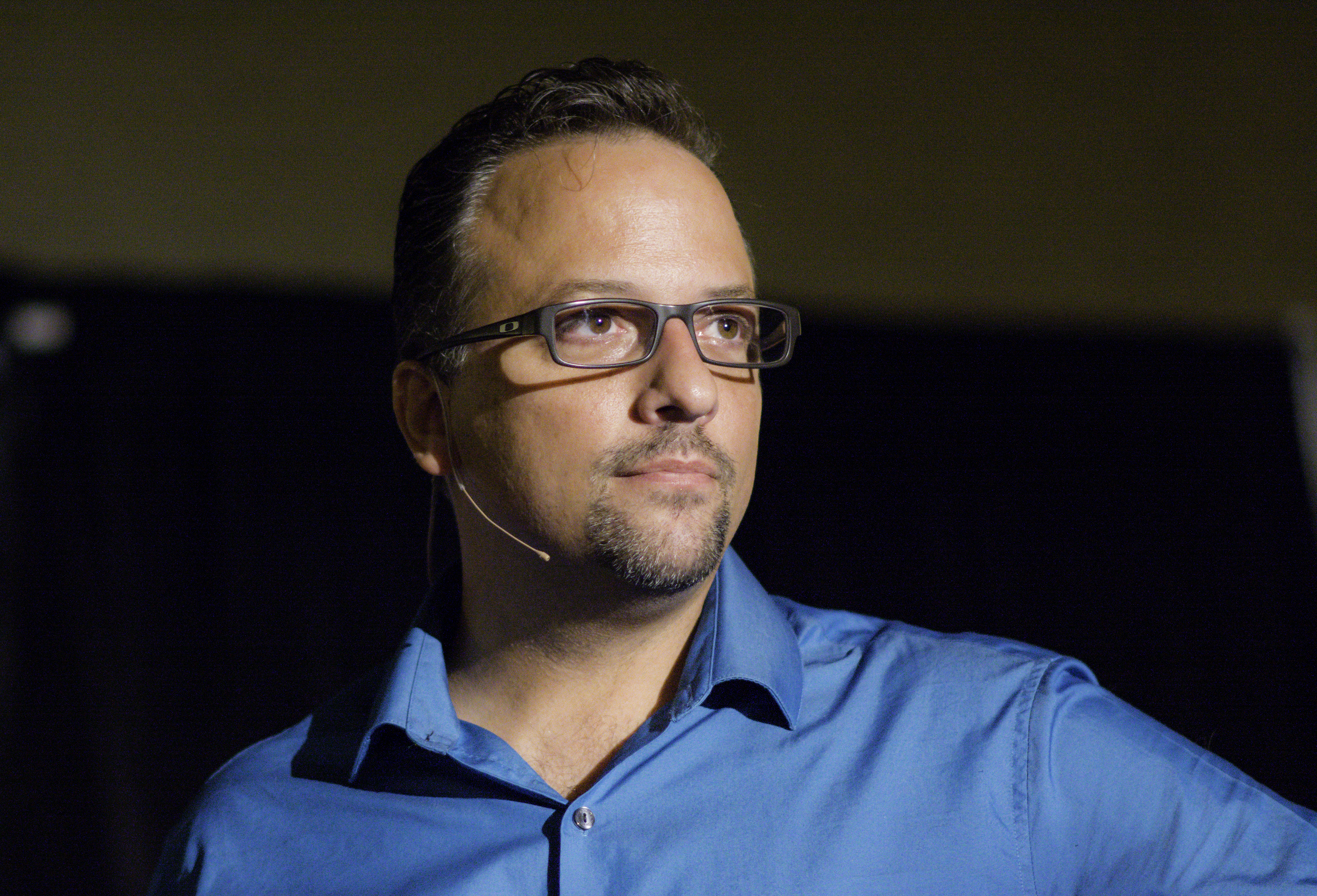
- Andrews at Apostacon, 2014
- Born: April 12, 1968 (age 58); Tulsa, Oklahoma, U.S.
- Occupations: Author, podcaster, speaker
- Writing career
- Subjects: Agnosticism, atheism, religion

Seth Andrews (born April 12, 1968) is an American activist, author, and speaker on the subject of atheism. He is the creator and host of The Thinking Atheist online community, podcast, and YouTube channel, as well as the author of four self-published books. Prior to his atheist activism, he was a fundamentalist Christian and had a ten-year career as a Christian radio host.

== Early life ==
Andrews was born in Tulsa, Oklahoma, into a Baptist Christian family with parents who studied theology, and he was baptized at the Eastwood Baptist Church. When his public-school education conflicted with the religious teachings he had received at home, his parents transferred him to the small, church-owned Temple Christian School, and later to the Eastwood Baptist School. As a student leader, he eagerly participated in school functions and religious activities, including weekly church services, the student council, and the local branch of Youth for Christ, for which he was a spokesman.

== Career as a radio host ==
Andrews was a fan of contemporary Christian music. He hosted the Morning Show on Christian radio station KXOJ-FM from 1990 to 2000.

The 1997 death of Christian songwriter Rich Mullins in a traffic accident played a role in Andrews' initial doubts about the truth of Christianity. He later commented, "As I spoke words of comfort to our listeners and callers, I struggled to reconcile the notion that the God of Matthew 10, the one who considered us worth 'more than many sparrows,' would design or abide the taking of Mullins' earthly life in such a pointless, gruesome manner." The terrorist attacks of September 11, 2001, also played a role in strengthening Andrews' doubts about religion and leading him to apostasy. In an interview with Rob Palmer for the Center for Inquiry, Seth stated, "After an arduous year, I realized that I had been living an inherited belief system and that the Bible is unsustainable scientifically, historically, and morally."

== The Thinking Atheist ==
In 2004, Andrews watched a video of atheist Christopher Hitchens debating Rabbi Shmuley Boteach, which made him decide to leave his faith. In 2008, he finally told his family and friends he was an atheist. Finding no community of other atheists in his area, he decided to build an atheist community online.

He created a website and Facebook page, both called The Thinking Atheist, to connect with other non-believers online and "share some of the information that I had found helpful in the hope of making the journey out of superstition (religion) easier for others". He considers the website to be a venue which allows people to engage their doubts and question their faith.

Andrews is the host of The Thinking Atheist weekly podcast, which aims to challenge stereotypes that depict atheists as angry, or religious people as stupid. In addition, he has a YouTube channel called The Thinking Atheist which hosts numerous self-produced atheist-related videos where he attempts to debunk the claims of Christians. He also engages in public speaking about atheism. Andrews also covers other skeptical topics like alternative medicine, supernatural healing, chakras, and the application of critical thinking to those topics. According to Andrews, his podcast shows are listed by topic instead of number to make it easier for a listener to find something agreeable.

== Recognition ==
- In 2012, The Thinking Atheist was voted the Favorite Agnostic/Atheist Website of 2012, winning the About.com Reader's Choice Award.
- In 2013, Andrews received the Evolve Award For Excellence in a Podcast for The Thinking Atheist, with the comment that "Andrews tackles issues about the world, atheism, and religion while showing that a person can be an atheist without being a grouch."

== Views on religion ==
In 2014, Andrews told the Arizona Daily Sun, "I was a true believer, and when I hit the age of 37, my doubts about my faith came to critical mass and for the first time in my life, I began to examine what I had held as true." About his recent activism he declared: "I'm not an enemy of religious people, but I'll be honest and say I am an enemy of religion."

When asked by AlterNet what his favorite Bible verse was, he replied that it was probably Romans 12:9, which reads 'Love must be sincere. Hate what is evil; cling to what is good.' He explained, "The message here isn't groundbreaking (and certainly doesn't require godlike powers to formulate), but I find it admirable: Don't be a fake. Pursue that which brings about a positive result, for yourself and for others. Hold evil in contempt. Of course, I don't bind a supernatural connotation to the word 'evil' but rather see evil as an action."

An Oklahoma news website asked Andrews about his opinion on Madalyn Murray O'Hair, the founder of American Atheists, who sued to end compulsory Bible reading in public schools in the 1960s. He replied, "I personally don't relate to her tactics, but while I myself may have a different style, I must give her credit. Madalyn was a such a champion for non-belief that she paid for it with her life. I have a tremendous amount of admiration (for her). She did a lot of good work."

In an interview with the Center for Inquiry, when asked about coming out against your support group's belief, he replied, "Well, it’s tribal reinforcement. If you disagree, if you’re not toeing the party line, then they will “other” you. We see this in many of the shunning religions, like Mormonism and the Jehovah’s Witnesses. There are familial and financial consequences if you do not agree. I think this points to a tremendous fragility and insecurity within many religions. In my opinion, any truth claim should welcome challenges, knowing that it will survive the storms."

== Books ==
=== Deconverted ===
In December 2012, Andrews self-published his autobiographical book Deconverted: A Journey From Religion To Reason, detailing his journey out of religion and how he became an atheist activist. In addition to discussing his apostasy, he recounts his life growing up in the Bible Belt and his past as a DJ for a Christian radio station, and discusses how and why he created the Thinking Atheist community.

Paleontologist Donald Prothero commented on the book as follows:

Andrews writes in a friendly, relaxed folksy style, just as you hear him on the air, and it suits his humble narrative well. He is a good storyteller and conversationalist not only in his radio work, but on the printed page as well... Andrews' book is a short but very enjoyable read. It is especially of interest to anyone who has made a similar journey from faith to non-belief, or wishes to understand how this process works.

=== Sacred Cows ===
In June 2015, Andrews self-published his second book, Sacred Cows: A Lighthearted Look at Belief and Tradition Around the World. In it he identifies ideas, beliefs and traditions that various cultures regard as holy, stressing that ideas should be examined critically rather than being followed with blind faith.

In a review for Skeptic magazine, Donald Prothero wrote,

Taking a gently incredulous tone, Andrews reviews a long litany of the strange things people believe and do. In most cases, he tries to be sympathetic and understanding. He always tries to keep things in perspective and remind his readers that he once accepted beliefs that seem odd to him now. But in other cases, it's impossible not to adopt a note of sarcasm and mockery at beliefs that are clearly bonkers.

=== Confessions of a Former Fox News Christian ===
Andrews published his third book, Confessions of a Former Fox News Christian, in July 2020, detailing his prior idolization of Rush Limbaugh, Glenn Beck, Ann Coulter, and Fox News. The book examines American conservative media that "constantly feed on (and feed into) public outrage, ignorance, bigotry, and fear".

=== Christianity Made Me Talk Like an Idiot ===
Andrews published his fourth book, Christianity Made Me Talk Like an Idiot, in January 2022.
