= The Ledge (film) =

- Theatrical release poster
- Directed by: Matthew Chapman
- Screenplay by: Matthew Chapman
- Produced by: Michael Mailer; Mark Damon; Steven Saxton; Matthew Chapman
- Starring: Charlie Hunnam; Terrence Howard; Liv Tyler; Christopher Gorham; Patrick Wilson
- Cinematography: Bobby Bukowski
- Edited by: Alex Hall; Anne McCabe
- Music by: Nathan Barr
- Distributed by: IFC Films
- Release dates: January 21, 2011 (Sundance); July 8, 2011 (United States)
- Running time: 101 minutes
- Country: United States
- Language: English
- Budget: $7.3 million
- Box office: $1.2 million

The Ledge is a 2011 American thriller drama film written and directed by Matthew Chapman, starring Charlie Hunnam, Terrence Howard, Liv Tyler, Christopher Gorham, and Patrick Wilson. It was released on July 8, 2011, being a box office bomb and panned by critics.

== Plot ==
Detective Hollis Lucetti (Terrence Howard) receives news from a doctor that he has been sterile his entire life. Upon reaching home, he questions his wife about who their children's father is.

The story switches to Gavin Nichols (Charlie Hunnam), an atheist, standing on the ledge of a tall building as if to jump to his death. A small crowd forms below Gavin, and Hollis responds to the emergency. At first it looks like a regular suicide attempt. It is quickly revealed to be more complex than that, as Gavin explains to Hollis that he has no other choice than to jump, or somebody else will die.

The story flashes back and describes the story of the love triangle between Gavin, Shana (Liv Tyler) and Joe (Patrick Wilson). Shana is the new girl at the hotel where Gavin works. She lives with her husband Joe in an apartment just down the hall from Gavin's. Joe is a fundamentalist Christian who infantilizes Shana. During a visit one night, Gavin and Joe discuss religion. Gavin neatly picks apart Joe's born again belief system, pointing out that most of the people on Earth would go to Hell, even Catholics, if Joe's faith were correct. Gavin points out that a Chinese child who dies in a traffic accident might never even know about Jesus, and therefore has no chance to be born again. Joe's response is that such an example is not proof of God's unfairness, but merely the reason why Christians are called to proselytize. Their discussion heats up into a full blown argument that ends when Shana asks Gavin to leave.

At work, Shana notices Gavin consoling one of his grief-stricken employees with talk about God. He puts on a genuine act as a believer which helps calm the employee down. On a walk with Gavin one day, she confides in him that she used to be a drug addict and a prostitute. She ended up with a john one night who liked to have sex in empty churches. He beat her badly afterward, and Joe discovered her in the sanctuary. Joe helped her turn her life around, and she feels an immense debt of gratitude to him. She tells Gavin that Joe wants them to move to Uganda to spread God's word.

Gavin and Shana spend more time with each other, and they eventually begin an affair. Joe quickly deduces what is going on and witnesses their assignations. He confronts Gavin as he is leaving for work and insists that he join him for a talk. In his apartment, Joe tells Gavin that he previously had a wife and two kids, but he would leave them at night to score drugs and hookers and do all kinds of depraved things. He lost his family and was drunk in a gutter when he was born again. He believes that, after God had already given him so much, God gave him Shana to take care of. He quotes Psalm 23 to Gavin and forces him at gunpoint to read Leviticus 20:10, "If a man commits adultery with another man’s wife—with the wife of his neighbor—both the adulterer and the adulteress are to be put to death."

Gavin counters with the story of the adulteress from John 8, whom Jesus saves by ordering only those without sin to cast a stone at her. Joe agrees that Gavin has a point, but he questions whether Gavin has the conviction to die for his beliefs. The next day, when Shana is supposed to leave Joe, Gavin is waiting for her to call. Joe calls Gavin instead and orders him to the top of a building. Joe has decided that, "I'm more of an Old Testament kind of guy", but instead of killing both Gavin and Shana, only one of them has to die. Joe has Shana at gunpoint and will kill her at noon if Gavin does not jump off the building.

Lucetti grows increasingly desperate to save Gavin. He tells him more about his story, explaining that his wife committed adultery out of love and fear that she would lose her husband. She wanted their children to look as much like Lucetti as possible. So, she slept with his younger brother. Gavin scolds Lucetti for focusing too much on the pain of his wife's betrayal instead of the love that motivated her. He asks Lucetti to tell Shana he loves her before jumping off the building. The police find Joe and Shana in a hotel room with a direct view of Gavin's suicide. Joe is arrested. Lucetti goes home to his wife and kids, seemingly determined to reconcile.

== Cast ==
- Charlie Hunnam as Gavin Nichols
- Patrick Wilson as Joe
- Liv Tyler as Shana
- Terrence Howard as Hollis Lucetti
- Christopher Gorham as Chris

== Production ==
Chapman, an atheist who identifies himself as a distant relative of Charles Darwin, wrote the character of Gavin Nichols to be the first openly atheist hero in a story about religious conflict. According to Chapman, it is "the first pro-atheist feature film ever to be released in America." His goal was to "put out a piece of work that makes the basic intellectual arguments for atheism, but also makes a powerful emotional argument against cruelty of a religious kind" and the "ways people suffer as a result."

Chapman was able to recruit his desired actors starting with Hunnam and the film was shot in Baton Rouge, Louisiana in March 2010. The film premiered in the U.S. Dramatic Competition at the Sundance Film Festival in January 2011. Shortly after its premiere, IFC paid just over $1 million to win the domestic rights to the film over three other bidders.

The film was primarily available on IFC's On Demand channel as it was given a very limited release in just 2 domestic theaters (making $9,216). The film did make $601,770 from international box office receipts. Upon its release, the film was attacked by Bill Donohue of the Catholic League, to whom Chapman responded directly.

== Critical reception ==
On Rotten Tomatoes, The Ledge holds an approval rating of 14% based on 29 reviews, with an average rating of 4.6/10. On Metacritic, the film has a weighted average score of 34 out of 100, based on 14 critics, indicating "generally unfavorable reviews".

Stephen Holden in The New York Times called The Ledge "the cinematic equivalent of what used to be called a problem play, in which the characters’ crises neatly mesh: in this case, neatly and preposterously." Holden, along with most other critics, was also critical of Tyler for "her usual blank, cow-eyed performance, pitching her voice more quietly than usual and adding a tinge of sadness". Variety praised Wilson, and to a lesser degree Hunnam, for working hard to give life to their "mostly one-dimensional characters."
