= Margaret Downey =

American nontheist activist

- Downey at Dragon Con in 2026
- Born: 16 August 1950 (age 76); United States
- Organization: The Freethought Society

Margaret Downey (born August 16, 1950) is an American nontheist activist who is a former President of Atheist Alliance International and founder and president of the Freethought Society (formerly Freethought Society of Greater Philadelphia). She also founded the Anti-Discrimination Support Network, which reports and helps deal with discrimination against atheists.

== Early life ==
Downey grew up with a Puerto Rican mother and an Irish father. When her father left, she adopted a family friend "Uncle Floyd" as a father-figure who encouraged Downey to become an atheist.

== Activism ==
Downey has been active in a variety of causes including feminism and anti-smoking campaigns before becoming a public representative of atheism.

Her first major involvement as a publicly active nontheist was when her son Matthew was not allowed to renew his membership in the Boy Scouts of America since he was raised in a nontheist household. This led to Margaret Downey v. Boy Scouts of America, which did not go far in the courts before the United States Supreme Court's 2000 decision in Boy Scouts of America v. Dale that the Boy Scouts constituted a private organization and could thus choose their own membership criteria, thus preventing Downey from taking her case further. Since then Downey has been a prominent public representative of atheism in the United States as well as representing atheists and other non-theists at United Nations conferences. Her work has been incorporated into United Nations reports on religious discrimination.

She is also affiliated with a variety of other organizations that promote atheism and the separation of church and state such as Freedom From Religion Foundation of which she is a board member and the American Humanist Association of which she is a past board member. In 2003 she was one of the signers of the Humanist Manifesto.

== See also ==
- Boy Scouts of America membership controversies
- Discrimination against atheists
