= Jamila Bey =

American journalist and public speaker

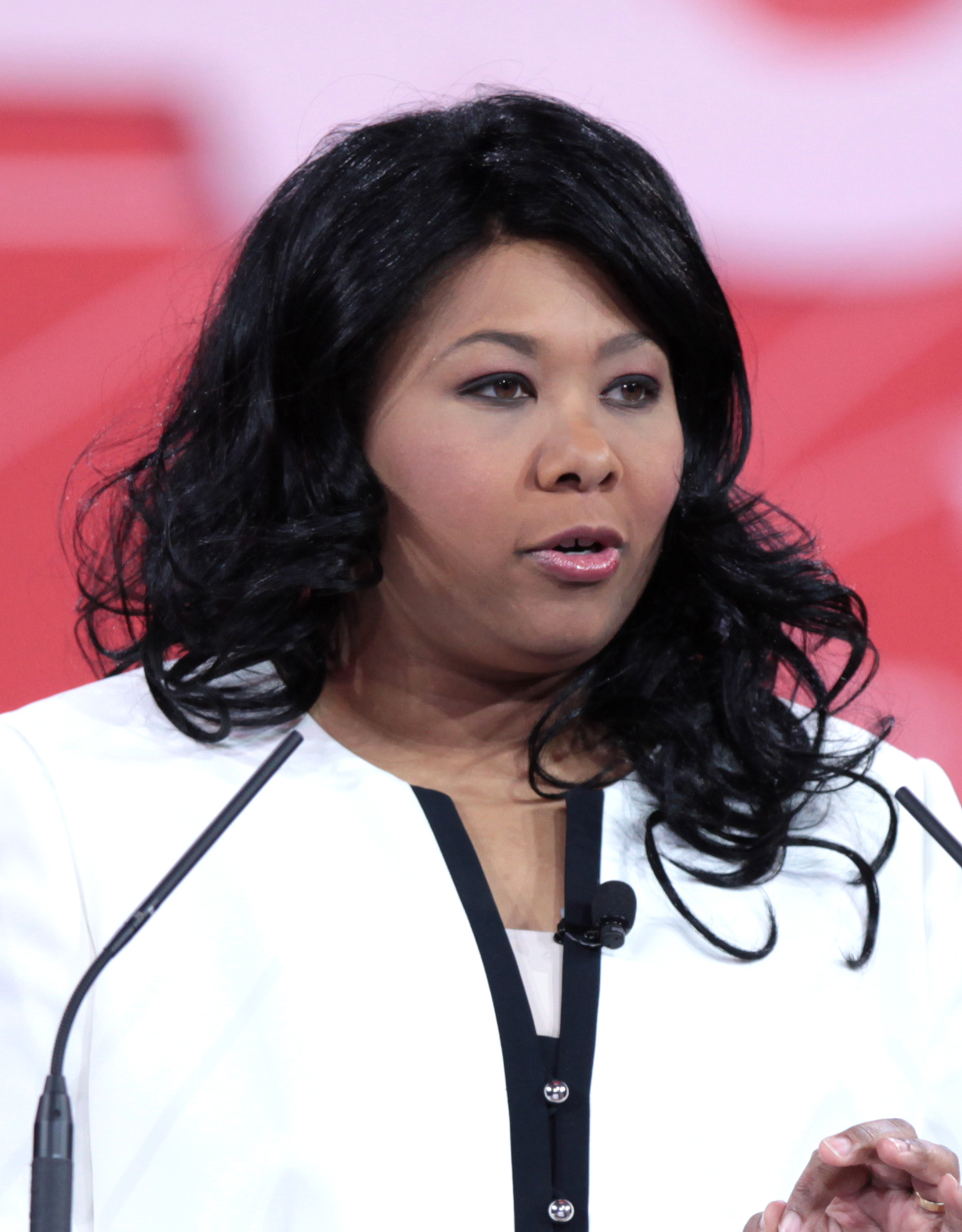
- Jamila Bey speaking at the CPAC in Baltimore in 2015
- Born: 1976 (age 49–50)
- Occupation: Journalist
- Notable credit(s): The Washington Post, Voice of Russia, NPR

Jamila Bey (born 1976) is an American journalist and public speaker. She was host of a weekly radio program The Sex, Politics And Religion Hour: SPAR With Jamila on Voice of Russia, and writes for The Washington Post's blog, She the People. Before working for the Washington Post and the Voice of Russia, Bey spent around a decade working as a producer and editor for National Public Radio, including for Morning Edition. She is African-American.

Bey is also an outspoken atheist, who has publicly stated that she believes religion to be actively detrimental to African-Americans, suggesting that religion both contributed to the physical enslavement of African Americans, and continues to contribute to their mental enslavement. She objects to the common characterization of the civil rights movement as a religious one, stating that although churches were significantly involved in the movement, "humans did all the work." A 2012 campaign by African Americans for Humanism placed billboards depicting Bey and other contemporary activists and organizers alongside historically prominent African American humanists Zora Neale Hurston, Langston Hughes, and Frederick Douglass.

In 2015 Bey became the first atheist activist to address the Conservative Political Action Conference’s annual meeting.
