= Atheist Alliance International =

International organization

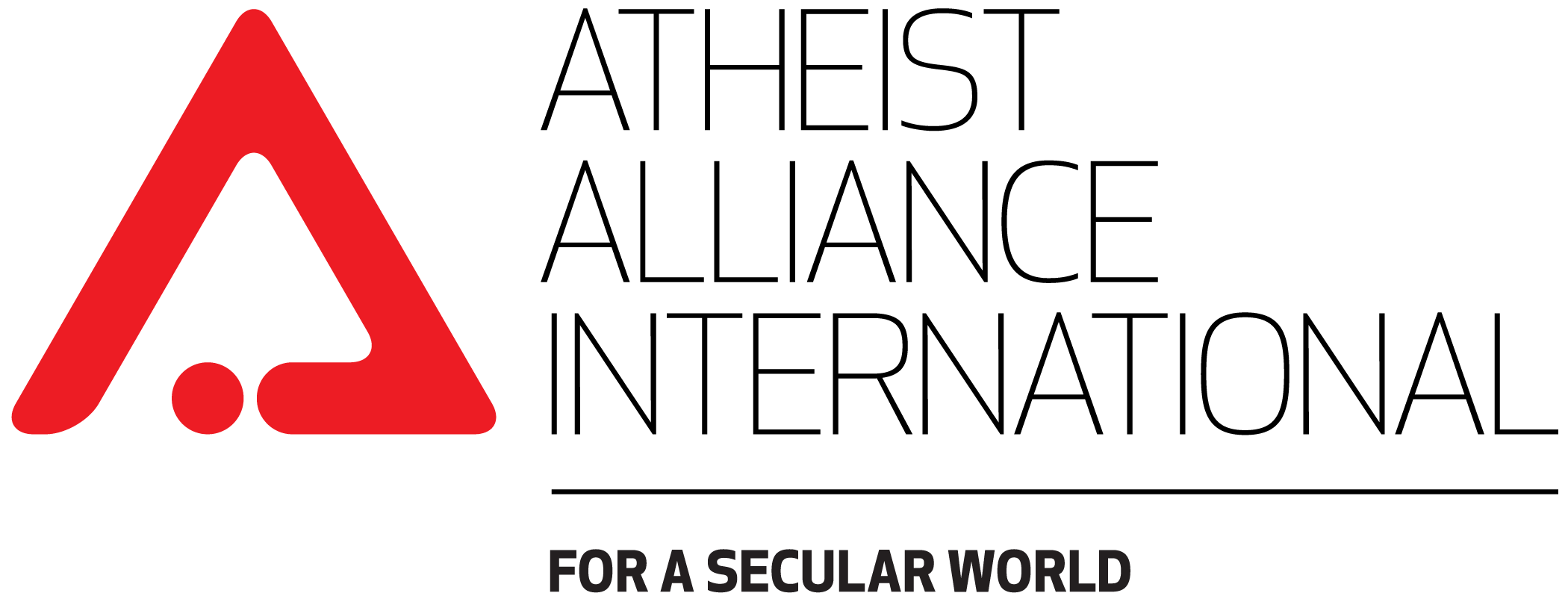
- Abbreviation: AAI
- Formation: 2011; 15 years ago
- Type: Non-profit (suspended by the California Secretary of State since 2021)
- Purpose: Advocacy of atheism and secularism
- Headquarters: Washington, D.C., United States
- Region served: Worldwide
- Official language: English, Spanish
- President: Tonoy Emroz Alam
- Affiliations: Special consultative status at United Nations Council of Europe Participatory Status (revoked in 2022) Affiliated local organisations on all continents other than Antarctica.
- Website: atheistalliance.org

Atheist Alliance International (AAI) is a non-profit advocacy organization committed to raising awareness and educating the public about atheism. The group supports atheist and freethought organizations around the world through promoting local campaigns, raising awareness of related issues, sponsoring secular education projects, and facilitating interaction among secular groups and individuals.

== History ==
Atheist Alliance International is an off-shoot of the Atheist Alliance.

Atheist Alliance was established in 1991 and incorporated in August 1992. Originally an alliance of four U.S.-based local atheist groups, it grew throughout the United States and internationally, and in 2001 it changed its name to Atheist Alliance International (AAI).

In 2006 AAI held its first international conference in Reykjavík, Iceland in coordination with the Atheist Society of Iceland.

In 2010 and 2011, AAI members approved the strategic separation of its international and U.S. segments:

- The international federation continued to use the name AAI while also forming a new foundation.
- The U.S. group (a separate entity) was named Atheist Alliance of America, and in 2022 it was rebranded as SecularHelp.

The launch of the newly restructured AAI occurred at the World Atheist Convention in Dublin, Ireland on 3 June 2011. AAI then described the organisation as follows:

Atheist Alliance International (AAI) is a global network of atheist and freethought groups and individuals, committed to educating its members and the public about atheism, secularism and related issues.

A positive global voice for atheism and secularism, AAl:

- Strengthens cooperation between atheist and freethought organisations around the world;
- Supports the establishment of new atheist/freethought organisations, particularly in developing countries; and
- Facilitates and supports projects/events that promote atheism, critical thinking and empiricism, while combating discrimination against atheists and freethinkers around the world.

In 2013, AAI was granted special consultative status by the United Nations Economic and Social Council.

In February 2018, AAI was granted participatory status at the Council of Europe.

During 2017-2018, a small number of directors placed AAI into what they called "Special Measures", without the knowledge of other directors, or any of the members.

On 20 May 2018 a "Directors Annual General Meeting" was held, without the knowledge of most of the members. At that AGM, new bylaws were introduced which, among other things:

- Removed the requirement for the board to hold Annual General Meetings.
- Removed the ability of members to nominate or elect directors, or (in the absence of AGMs) to propose or vote on any other motions.
- Removed the requirement for the board to publish annual accounts to the members.

In 2021, the Secretary of State of California suspended AAI.

In 2022, AAI's participatory status at the Council of Europe was revoked.

== Organization structure ==
AAI's Board consists of between 4 and 13 Directors elected for two-year staggered terms. Affiliates or individual members can propose candidates for the Board, and the annual general meeting votes on them and elects directors.

As of April 2024, the current leadership includes:

Executive Committee

- President – Tonoy Emroz Alam (Bangladesh/Germany); & Atheist Support Network Director
- Vice President – August Berkshire (USA)
- Secretary & Treasurer – Fotis Frangopoulos (Greece)

Regional Directors

- Africa – Ebuka Ikeorah (Nigeria)
- Asia – Arif Hussain Theruvath (India)
- Australasia – Stella Thomas (Australia)
- Europe – Kristina Hallmeier (Germany)
- North America – Christine Shellska (Canada)
- South and Central America – Alfonso Ugarte Johnson (Bolivia)

Board Members At-Large

- Hugo Estrella (Argentina/Italy) - Advocacy Director
- Norhaiyah Mahmood (Singapore) - Development Director
- Jason Sylvester (Canada, pan-Asia) – Digital Media Director (AAI Blogging, Podcast Host)

== Projects ==
Generic atheist symbol, the result of a 2007 AAI contest, created by Michigan artist Diane Reed.

AAI assists Kasese School in Western Uganda. This is a humanist school that provides secular education in a remote area of the country. AAI's education policy supports the right to secular education, and asserts the need for education in critical thinking and the distinction between faith and reason as a guide to knowledge beliefs along with the spirit of free inquiry and the teaching of science free from religious interference and the respect for evidence. AAI is opposed to indoctrination and dogma—religious or otherwise.

The organization has a flagship publication called Secular World which is published quarterly. Members also receive AAI Insider, a fortnightly newsletter.

== UN submissions ==
- In September 2016 Atheist Alliance International made a submission to the United Nations Human Rights Council in which they criticised the Blasphemy law in the Republic of Ireland. Following a referendum in 2018, this constitutional requirement was removed by the Thirty-seventh Amendment of the Constitution of Ireland.
- In June 2019 the United Nations Economic and Social Council circulated a submission from Atheist Alliance International titled "Empowering People and Ensuring Inclusiveness and Equality for Non-Believers".
- In January 2020 a written submission was made to the United Nations Human Rights Council (UNHRC) as part of AAI's "Right to be Secular" campaign. This was followed by a video submission to the UNHRC in March 2021.The video from AAI was not played in the UN session for which it was submitted, and this submission has never been made public by AAI. Atheist Ireland subsequently clarified that there is already "an established internationally recognised human right to be atheist, agnostic, secular, humanist, or in any other way free from religion."

== Governance issues ==
In 2016, the California Franchise Tax Board revoked AAI's tax-exempt status, which according to AAI in an Annual Report document was due to a failure to submit forms since 2013.

When the then President, David Orenstein, resigned after having been in office from May 2022 to June 2022, AAI's announcement of the resignation included this quote from Orenstein: "When I accepted the role of President on May 22, I was aware of the governance issue [sic] that have been raised. I have done sufficient due diligence to know it is hugely overblown and that AAI is an honourable organization doing wonderful work for atheists. I believed, and still believe, the allegations can be tackled head-on."

In a public announcement in June 2022, the then Vice President Nina Sankari stated "A few days ago, after obtaining information about the disastrous legal status of the AAI ..., I submitted my resignation from the role of Vice President of AAI and of its board member [sic], seeing no further possibility of acting within its framework."

In November 2022 AAI published a "Disclosure Document" as a response to allegations of mismanagement. This document detailed a number of management and financial recordkeeping issues from the previous five years.

== Voting issues ==
Some AAI members have complained that the board has used the ambiguous concept of "formal" membership to arbitrarily deny voting rights to member organisations. In 2021 the Greek Helsinki Monitor published an article claiming that, during the Annual General Meeting of AAI that year, there was a "denial of the right to vote of our Humanist Union of Greece", in contravention of the bylaws.

== Richard Dawkins Award ==
In 2003, the Atheist Alliance of America, in coordination with Richard Dawkins and the Richard Dawkins Foundation for Reason and Science, established an annual award called the Richard Dawkins Award. In 2019, the award was formally moved to the Center for Inquiry (CFI) which had merged with the Richard Dawkins Foundation for Reason and Science a few years earlier.

== AAI in the media ==
- The Washington Post - "Atheists rally for persecuted unbeliever in Indonesia"
- National Geographic - "The World's Newest Major Religion: No Religion"
- Da Ali G Show. Featuring the then President of AAI, Bobbie Kirkhart.

== See also ==
- Humanists International
