= Humanist Manifesto I =

1933 manifesto

A Humanist Manifesto, also known as Humanist Manifesto I to distinguish it from later Humanist Manifestos in the series, was written in 1933 primarily by Raymond Bragg and published with 34 signers. Unlike the later manifestos, this first talks of a new religion and refers to humanism as "the religion of the future." Nevertheless, it is careful not to express a creed or dogma. The document outlines fifteen affirmations on cosmology, biological and cultural evolution, human nature, epistemology, ethics, religion, self-fulfillment, and the quest for freedom and social justice. This latter, stated in article fourteen, proved to be the most controversial, even among humanists, in its opposition to "acquisitive and profit-motivated society" and its demand for an egalitarian world community based on voluntary mutual cooperation. The document's release was reported by the mainstream media on May 1, simultaneous with its publication in the May/June 1933 issue of the New Humanist.

Two manifestos followed: Humanist Manifesto II in 1973 and Humanism and Its Aspirations in 2003.

== List of signers ==
Of the 65 people who were asked to sign, 34 accepted. About half (15) were Unitarians. The 34 were:

- J. A. C. Fagginger Auer (Parkman Professor of Church History and Theology, Harvard University; Professor of church history, Tufts College.)
- E. Burdette Backus (minister, First Unitarian Church of Los Angeles)
- Harry Elmer Barnes (general editorial department, Scripps-Howard Newspapers.)
- L. M. Birkhead (the Liberal Center, Kansas City, Missouri.)
- Raymond B. Bragg (secretary, Western Unitarian Conference.)
- Edwin Arthur Burtt (professor of philosophy, Sage School of Philosophy, Cornell University.)
- Ernest Caldecott (minister, First Unitarian Church of Los Angeles, California.)
- A. J. Carlson (professor of physiology, University of Chicago.)
- John Dewey (Columbia University.)
- Albert C. Dieffenbach (former editor of the Christian Register.)
- John H. Dietrich (minister, First Unitarian Society, Minneapolis.)
- Bernard Fantus (professor of therapeutics, College of Medicine, University of Illinois.)
- William Floyd (editor of the Arbitrator, New York City.)
- F.H. Hankins (professor of economics and sociology, Smith College.)
- A. Eustace Haydon (professor of history of religions, University of Chicago.)
- Llewellyn Jones (literary critic and author.)
- Robert Morss Lovett (editor, The New Republic; professor of English, University of Chicago.)
- Harold P. Marley (minister, the Fellowship of Liberal Religion, Ann Arbor, Michigan.)
- R. Lester Mondale (minister, Unitarian Church, Evanston, Illinois.)
- Charles Francis Potter (leader and founder, the First Humanist Society of New York, Inc.)
- John Herman Randall, Jr. (department of philosophy, Columbia University.)
- Curtis W. Reese (dean, Abraham Lincoln Center, Chicago.)
- Oliver L. Reiser (associate professor of philosophy, University of Pittsburgh.)
- Roy Wood Sellars (professor of philosophy, University of Michigan.)
- Clinton Lee Scott (minister, Universalist Church, Peoria, Illinois.)
- Maynard Shipley (president, the Science League of America.)
- W. Frank Swift (director, Boston Ethical Society.)
- V. T. Thayer (educational director, Ethical Culture Schools.)
- Eldred C. Vanderlaan (leader of the Free Fellowship, Berkeley, California.)
- Joseph Walker (attorney, Boston, Massachusetts.)
- Jacob J. Weinstein (rabbi; advisor to Jewish Students, Columbia University.)
- Frank S. C. Wicks (All Souls Unitarian Church, Indianapolis.)
- David Rhys Williams (minister, Unitarian Church, Rochester, New York.)
- Edwin H. Wilson (managing editor, the New Humanist, Chicago, Illinois; minister, Third Unitarian Church, Chicago, Illinois.)

A 35th signature, that of Alson Robinson, came in too late for it to be published with the other 34.
