= Leon Milton Birkhead =

American minister and propagandist (1885–1954)

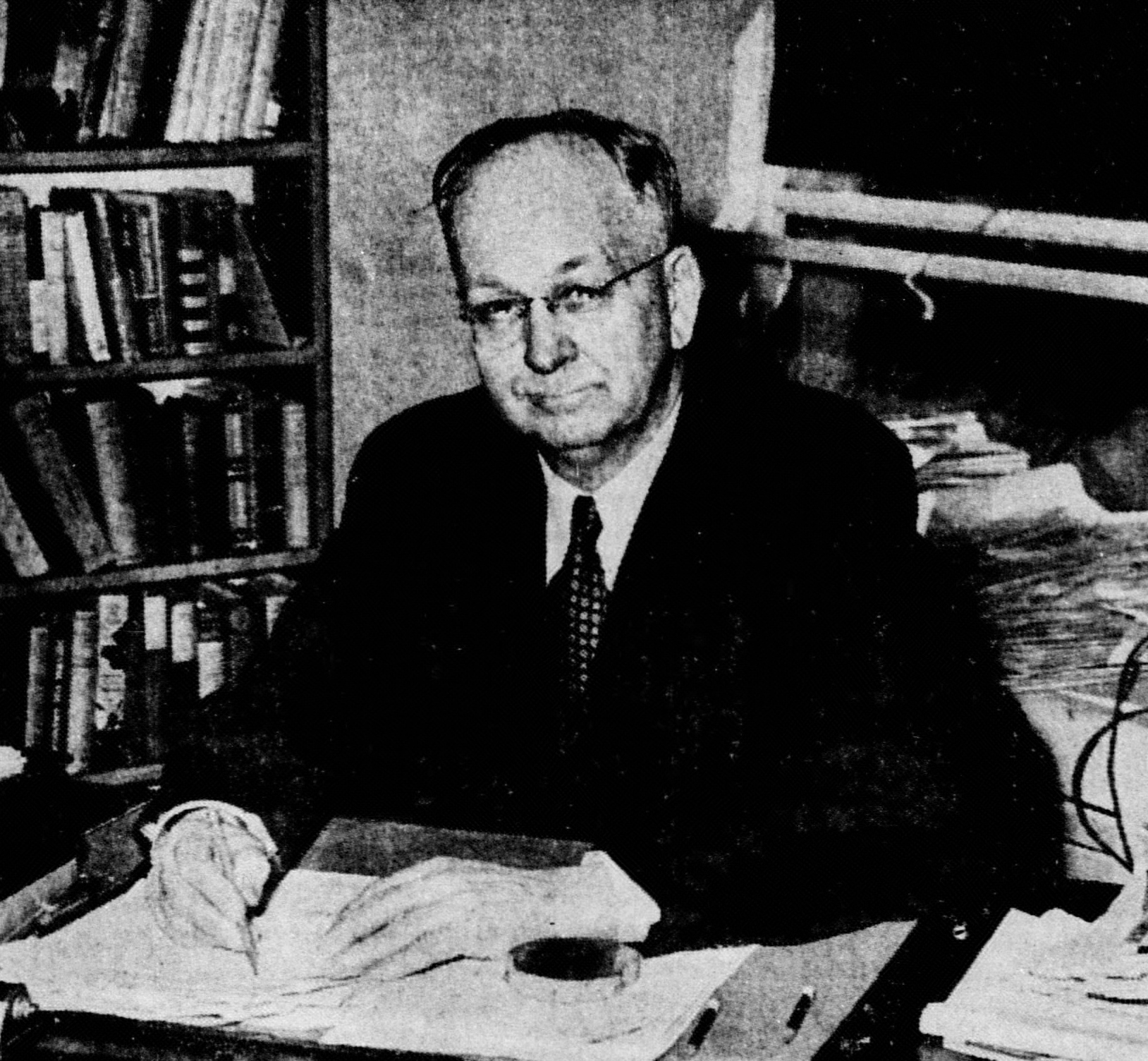
- Birkhead in 1944
- Born: April 28, 1885; Winfield, Missouri, U.S.
- Died: December 1, 1954 (aged 69); New York City, New York, U.S.
- Education: McKendree College (BA)
- Occupations: Minister; propagandist
- Known for: Friends of Democracy, Inc.
- Spouse: Agnes Schiereck (m. 1913)
- Children: 1

Ecclesiastical career
- Religion: Methodism (before 1915); Unitarianism (after 1915)
- Church: All Souls Unitarian Church (1917–1939); The Liberal Center (1933–1939)

Leon Milton Birkhead (April 28, 1885 – December 1, 1954) was an American Unitarian minister who founded the Friends of Democracy (FOD) after a 1935 visit to Nazi Germany. It was a pro-democracy, anti-fascist, and interventionist propaganda and educational group. Historians generally regard Birkhead as one of the most energetic and effective anti-fascist investigators in America during World War II.

Born in Winfield, Missouri, Birkhead began work as a Methodist preacher in 1904 while attending McKendree College. He was fully ordained as a minister in the Methodist Episcopal Church in 1911 and took head of a St. Louis church in 1913. An agnostic socialist, Birkhead was too radical for his congregation and he left his pulpit and Methodism in 1915. He was swiftly welcomed into the American Unitarian Association and in 1917 he took head of All Souls Unitarian Church in Kansas City, Missouri. Under his leadership, the church expanded and became increasingly and then wholly secular, becoming known as "The Liberal Center". Birkhead appreciated the ability to gain publicity and his heterodox liberal views frequently sparked local and nationwide controversy. A proponent of evolution, Birkhead joined the defense in the Scopes Monkey Trial where he began a decades-long friendship with H. L. Mencken. Birkhead was chief advisor to Sinclair Lewis when he wrote the anti-ministerial Elmer Gantry. He was the lead defender of the controversial novel. A religious humanist, Birkhead proposed, partly authored, and signed A Humanist Manifesto.

Birkhead visited Nazi Germany in 1935, uncovering Julius Streicher's plan to eradicate Jewry and stealing a list of American Nazi sympathizers. Birkhead dedicated the rest of his life to fighting fascism, and he would soon found the FOD, resign his pulpit, and move to New York. Birkhead targeted isolationists, antisemites, racists, and fascists. The FOD first targeted U.S. Senate candidate Gerald Burton Winrod, who blamed Birkhead after being defeated. It also bore some credit for Charles Coughlin being taken off air, and was one of the most outspoken, largest, and harshest critics of the America First Committee and its leaders. The FOD prospered during the war and many prominent individuals joined or endorsed it. Birkhead's perennial targets included the Chicago Tribune, New York Daily News, and Gerald L. K. Smith. The FOD worked closely with Freedom House and the Writers' War Board, with Rex Stout becoming the FOD's president. The FOD's chief investigator, Arthur Derounian, authored Under Cover, a best-selling exposé of fascism. Birkhead was one of the most well-informed anti-fascists in the United States and he was consulted by many federal agencies. The FOD published educational material as well as large amounts of propaganda, which Birkhead called "the most effective weapon in modern times".

Birkhead's wife Agnes and their son Kenneth were both also active in left-wing politics. After the end of World War II, the FOD continued to focus on right-wing extremism and it expanded until 1947. The threat of fascism receded in the public imagination and was replaced with communism. During the Second Red Scare, the FOD attempted to gain anti-communist plaudits but Birkhead continued to believe that fascism was a greater threat. He opposed the House Un-American Activities Committee (HUAC) and Senator Joseph McCarthy. In 1947, hostile action from the U.S. Treasury Department destabilized the FOD's funding, Birkhead was defanged by a nearly-successful libel suit, and his old foe Smith testified that Birkhead was a communist before HUAC. The FOD eventually collapsed. Birkhead declined personally and became estranged from Agnes. He died destitute in a New York City hotel.

== Early life ==
=== Childhood ===
Leon Milton Birkhead was born on April 28, 1885, near Winfield, Missouri, to Hiram Lincoln "Link" and Mattie (née Turnball) Birkhead. Birkhead was usually referred to with his initials, L. M., by those close to him. His father was originally affiliated with the Restoration Movement before becoming a Baptist and his mother was a Methodist, which Birkhead was as well. He was the oldest of seven children and became a minister because his mother, who had been raised by a dentist cousin, wanted her son to enter a respected profession, and Birkhead concluded that the ministry was even more respected than dentistry. His father had a 100-acre farm and the crops from the 1903 harvest were to pay for Birkhead's college tuition, but they were destroyed by flooding. He spent 1903 working for a St. Louis shoe company, saving enough to attend McKendree College in 1904.

=== Education ===
At McKendree, a Methodist college in Lebanon, Illinois, Birkhead's time was split between his education and fieldwork as a preacher in Southern Illinois. In 1904, he was ordained to preach but not give communion or commence marriage. He described his revivals as belonging to the Holy Roller variety. He also organized a church in Granite City, Illinois, and served a church in Madison, Illinois. After studying geology, Birkhead began to doubt the story of creation. He graduated in 1910 with a Bachelor of Arts. He then attended the conservative Methodist Drew Theological Seminary in an attempt to make his views more orthodox. Repulsed by the rejection of modernism he saw, Birkhead recalled that he became agnostic. He then attended the more liberal Union Theological Seminary as well as Columbia University. Exposed to various liberal religious views, Birkhead said he began to think himself too liberal for Methodism, but he said that friends convinced him he would be better served as a liberalizing force inside the church than outside. He did not receive any more degrees, but was still often referred to as "Doctor". Birkhead was fully ordained as a Methodist minister in March 1911 and began working as an assistant pastor at a large church in New York City. The head minister of that church, Christian F. Reisner, frequently advertised it and Birkhead came to participate in the advertising, something he incorporated and became well known for in his later endeavors.

=== Missouri Methodist ministries ===
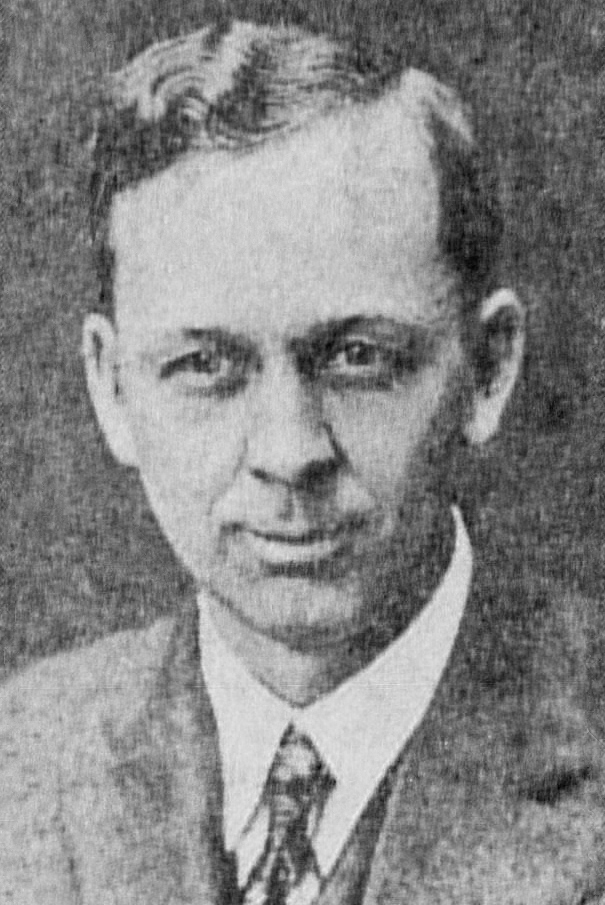
Birkhead c. 1915

In 1912, he was assigned to St. Louis's Maple Avenue Methodist Episcopal Church as an assistant pastor. In 1913, he became senior pastor after his predecessor left for a church in Baltimore. Later in 1913, he became pastor at Wagoner Memorial Church, also in St. Louis. His sermons frequently dealt with the social and economic problems of the time. He also co-founded a debating society with Roger Nash Baldwin, who later co-founded the American Civil Liberties Union (ACLU), an organization Birkhead was also active in.

Birkhead was more radical than most of the church's membership and, under his leadership, Sunday morning sermon attendance and donations suffered a significant decline, making church leaders unhappy. In 1915, Birkhead criticized the evangelist Billy Sunday, whom he called "more a freak than an evangelist". His opposition to Sunday was unpopular and sparked questioning on whether he could continue to serve. On March 10, 1915, Birkhead resigned from the Methodist Episcopal Church and his pulpit. Birkhead said that most of his flock were not ready for his ideas and he declared himself in disagreement with all of Methodism's 25 articles. He declared that real Christianity was "love to God and love to man". Birkhead rejected the existence of miracles, the resurrection, Moses's receiving of the Ten Commandments and authorship of the first two books of the Old Testament, and the existence of heaven and hell. Birkhead was a proponent of the Social Gospel.

=== Personal life ===
Birkhead met Agnes Schiereck while doing mission work at the church she attended in downtown St. Louis. She was born in St. Louis on April 20, 1886, and had been working as a stenographer in 1907 when she passed the civil service exam, becoming a deputy collector of the Internal Revenue Service. She was the youngest person and first woman to serve as deputy collector at the St. Louis office. They married in September 1913 and she left her job, which was customary. Their only child, Kenneth, was born on November 15, 1914. Agnes left the Methodist church at the same time as Birkhead, saying it was after several years of thought and independent of her husband's decision.

Birkhead was an insomniac. He was also a frequent reader of books, both fiction and non-fiction, and would often read through the entirety of the night. Birkhead lamented that most ministers did not study books, saying that he had stopped visiting his congregants unless they were old, ill, or dying so he could study. Birkhead often incorporated recently published books or classics into his sermons. Throughout his life, Birkhead was also a frequent collector, mostly of small texts related to his church duties; later in life, he would collect newspaper clippings that interested him, usually going through about 30 newspapers each day. He was an amateur theater actor, often playing characters satirizing ministers and mostly acting in plays with strong messages about social issues. Birkhead was fascinated by psychology and he frequently made it the topic of lectures, taught classes on it, and reviewed books on it.

== Unitarianism ==
Less than two week after resigning his pulpit, Birkhead was preaching to a Unitarian congregation, and he was admitted to the denomination by the end of March 1915. He said the purpose of the Unitarian church was "to affirm frequently that it is possible to be decent and honorable without accepting meaningless and outgrown traditions and beliefs."

=== First Unitarian Church ===
Birkhead was invited to take head of the First Unitarian Church in Wichita, Kansas, arriving in July 1915. The church had been formed in 1903 and, at the time of his arrival, was no longer growing, averaging a Sunday attendance below 50. The church met in June and July, which was unusual for Unitarian churches that usually were not in session during the summer months. In his sermons, Birkhead frequently attacked the traditional Christian doctrine that he had repudiated in leaving Methodism, frequently praising "heretics". By the end of 1915, the church's membership had increased by 25%. Birkhead campaigned for the creation of a middle school, a retirement home, worker rights, road improvement, a farm dedicated to rehabilitating prisoners, and a housing commission to prevent the creation of slums. He debated the city's mayor, Orsemus Hills Bentley, opposing the mayor's plan to create a city manager position; Birkhead would fearmonger to Wichita's Black residents, noting that most city managers were racist Southerners. In November 1916, Birkhead presided over a campaign event at a public speaking forum in Wichita for Allen L. Benson, presidential nominee of the Socialist Party.

Birkhead advertised his church in newspapers to increase attendance, which was unusual, and also joined and led local advertiser groups. His unorthodox views were unpopular with Wichita's other clergymen. In January 1917, an arsonist attempted to burn down the church, but only damaged its front door. Birkhead attacked the Evangelist E. J. Bulgin when he visited Wichita, with Bulgin responding to the attacks by calling Birkhead "a Godless Preacher, wolf in sheep's clothing" to his audience of 7,300. The church's finances significantly improved under his tenure and it paid off all debt on its building and no longer required the support of the American Unitarian Association (AUA) to survive. In some of Birkhead's only handwritten records to survive, notes before a meeting with the church's board dated to 1917, he writes that his salary was less than that of other comparable ministers and insufficient, also saying that he lacked necessary amenities. In November 1917, Birkhead was invited to take head of All Souls Unitarian Church in Kansas City, Missouri, a much larger church in a much larger city that likely paid much better.

=== All Souls Unitarian Church ===
All Souls Unitarian Church had been established in 1868 and was housed at a large stone church built in 1905. In 1917, the church only had 46 members who donated to it, although several of its members were prominent in the city. In his first four months, Birkhead told the church's board of trustees that he had officiated 5 funerals, preached to the church 18 times, addressed other organizations 19 times, and given 100 house calls to congregants. His sermons were frequently dedicated to the ongoing World War I and he took part in the liberty bond campaign, served on the Committee on Political Prisoners of the National Civil Liberties Bureau, actively supported the League of Nations, and said he volunteered as a chaplain for "the liberals" at Camp Funston and Fort Leavenworth. In May 1918, Birkhead recognized the centennial of the birth of Karl Marx, to whom he declared "the world owes a great debt".

Birkhead continued to declare the value of advertisements in Kansas City and he garnered large amounts of free publicity by providing provocative quotes to local newspapers. All Souls was closed during the hot and humid summers, a time when Birkhead would speak on the Chautauqua circuit. Following the arrival of Birkhead and Agnes, membership at All Souls greatly increased. Partly to prevent Birkhead being poached by another Unitarian church, he was awarded regular salary increases. In 1921, Birkhead helped Agnes organize the "Get Acquainted Club", a successful social club at All Souls that aimed to solve loneliness with dancing and whose only rule was a ban on discussing religion. In 1921, Birkhead said that he had officiated 19 weddings, 21 funerals, and given 217 addresses. All Souls had a Sunday school which had 66 children in attendance in 1922. In 1923, Birkhead called for All Souls's church to be expanded, and it was, adding another wing that included more classrooms and a kitchen, with the main auditorium also doubling in capacity to allow it to fit 300; the expansion was funded with a $10,000 fundraiser and a $10,000 loan from the AUA.

Birkhead was opposed by much of Kansas City's clergy, with the fiercest opposition coming from moderate minister Bill Stidger. The regular debates between the two ministers ensured that religion was often in the news in Kansas City, an outcome both men desired. Lester Mondale, a later minister of All Souls, said that most of the city's clergy hated Birkhead. He noted in particular an occasion when all of the city's ministers had prayed for rain during a severe drought; Birkhead was the only minister in attendance to bring an umbrella, which the other ministers found mocking. Birkhead's daughter-in-law later recalled that he was always certain that prayer could not cause rain.

=== Political activism and views ===
Birkhead said he joined the Republican Party because he found William Jennings Bryan, thrice the presidential standard-bearer for the Democratic Party, "so appallingly ignorant". He said he left the party in 1928, repulsed by the anti-Catholic hysteria that occurred after Al Smith won the Democratic presidential nomination. In Kansas City, politics were dominated by two Democrats: Joe Shannon and Tom Pendergast. In 1918, Birkhead monitored a polling place and witnessed rampant voter fraud. Birkhead called for a vast overhaul of Kansas City and Missouri's governance, declaring that Kansas City was marred by "political corruption and immoral conditions" and demanding the implementation of a city manager system. Birkhead would speak to any group that gave him a platform to advocate against corruption, against vice, and for Kansas City's beautification.

In January 1922, Birkhead delivered a speech to a women's club at the Kansas City Athenaeum criticizing the city's handling of an effort to remove sex workers from the streets, saying that it was not cooperating with police. Mayor James Cowgill called a meeting with Birkhead, civic groups, and city officials to answer Birkhead's accusations. The meeting was heated until Cowgill rose to answer a question in anger and suddenly dropped dead. Birkhead was the director of a civic group dedicated to implementing a new city charter. During the 1922 elections, Birkhead organized a group of 1,500 women to support the Republican campaign effort. After Republicans won the mayoralty in 1924, they implemented a city manager system, which was instantly subverted by Pendergast to dominate the city. Pendergast was eventually defeated in 1939 after All Souls congregant and judge Merrill E. Otis sentenced him to fifteen months in prison for tax evasion.

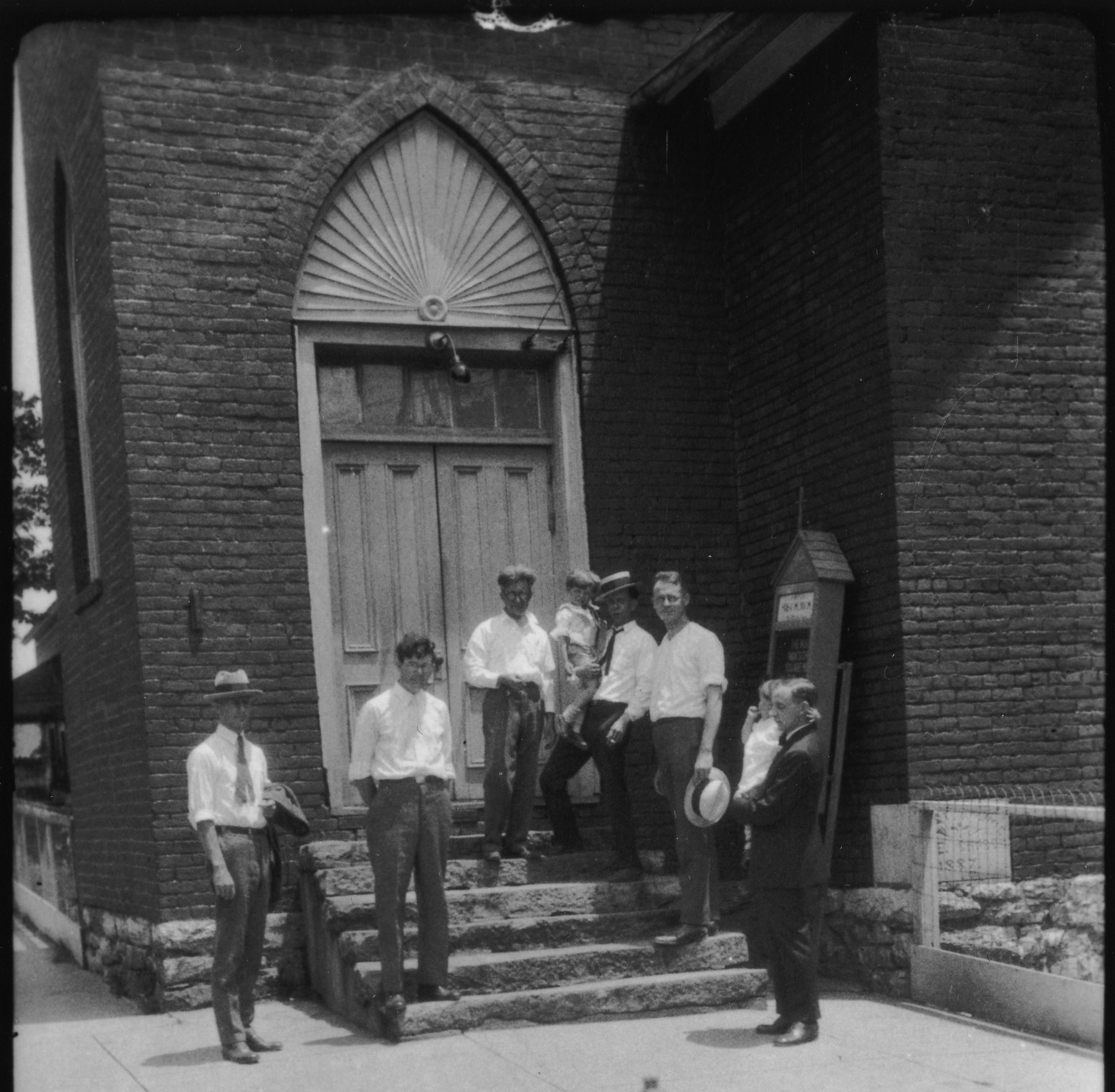
Birkhead (far left) during the Scopes Monkey Trial

Birkhead was a proponent of evolution and supported its inclusion in school curriculums, sharply criticizing creationists. Birkhead resented legislatures deciding one interpretation of the Bible was legitimate. He clashed and debated with the "Flying Fundamentalists", a traveling band of opponents of evolution which included William Bell Riley, Arthur I. Brown, Harry Rimmer, and Gerald Burton Winrod. Birkhead debated with Riley multiple times amid efforts to ban the teaching of evolution in Birkhead's home-state of Missouri and Riley's home-state of Minnesota; after Brown and Winrod attended a service at All Souls where Birkhead defended evolution, the scientifically-minded Brown stated that many scientists opposed evolution while a distressed Winrod condemned Birkhead and the congregants. In late June 1925, Birkhead and his family drove to the town of Dayton, Tennessee, to take part in the Scopes Monkey Trial, in which the ACLU challenged the legality of a law banning the teaching of evolution. Birkhead began assisting the ACLU's Clarence Darrow-led defense team which was opposed by a William Jennings Bryan-led prosecution. Charles Francis Potter, another Unitarian minister, also aided the defense. H. L. Mencken, reporting on the trial for The Baltimore Sun, would note that Birkhead and Potter were "prowling around the town looking for a chance to discharge their 'hellish heresies'". Mencken and Birkhead became good friends at the trial and began a decades-long correspondence, where Mencken, an opponent of religion, would always address Birkhead as "Dear Pastor".

There are conflicting accounts of where Birkhead and his family resided during the trial. In his reporting, Mencken said that they were encamped on a road outside the town. In a friendly profile by Ely Jacques Kahn Jr. in The New Yorker, they are said to have brought a portable tent to Dayton and, unable to find camping ground in it, they got permission to pitch it on the lawn of the house where Darrow and fellow defense attorneys Arthur Garfield Hays and Dudley Field Malone were staying. Potter, in his autobiography, says they were staying with him at the former home of First Lady Edith Wilson. Potter recounted that the house lacked water at the outset of the trial and an emergency pipeline was accidentally destroyed by Emanuel and Marcet Haldeman-Julius when they visited; the trial was where Birkhead first met the Haldeman-Juliuses, socialist publishers of the Little Blue Books. Birkhead would eventually author 13 Little Blue Books. Agnes worked as a stenographer for the defense, with one person present recalling that the work had left her "almost ill". Birkhead ran errands during the trial and worked with preparing scientists to testify, though they were ultimately not allowed to and the defense was defeated. Birkhead felt the defense erred in trying to prove no conflict between Christianity and evolution, which he said obviously existed.

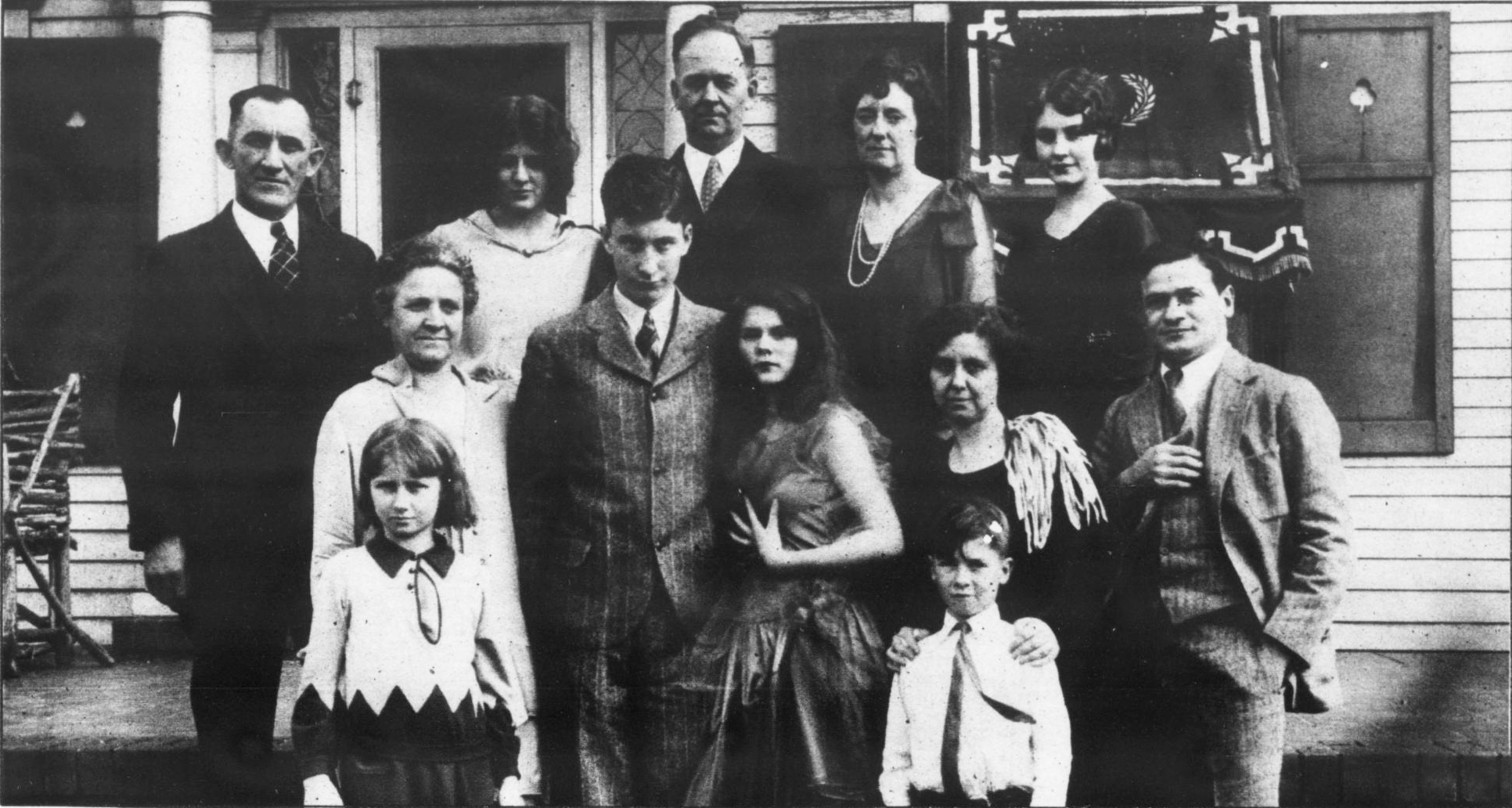
Birkhead (top center) ahead of the wedding ceremony

Birkhead supported the Nineteenth Amendment to the U.S. Constitution, women's right to smoke (while opposing the practice itself), and euthanasia; he opposed efforts to suppress jazz and defended flappers. Birkhead was also a proponent of birth control and called voluntary parenthood the "highest type of parenthood"; in 1931, Margaret Sanger spoke at All Souls to an audience of exclusively women. Agnes aided in the founding of the first Planned Parenthood in Kansas City. In November 1927, Birkhead married the 20-year-old Aubrey Clay Roselle and the 18-year-old Josephine Haldeman-Julius, who was the adopted daughter of Emanuel and Marcet. Their marriage was a companionate marriage, and Josephine and Aubrey agreed to allow divorce with no alimony if one person did not want the marriage to continue after they graduated high school and if they had no children. This ignited nationwide controversy and Birkhead faced widespread condemnation, partially because he had omitted mention of God in the ceremony. Birkhead later renewed Emanuel and Marcet's vows in a similar ceremony. His right-wing enemies would call him a "free-love parson" for the rest of his life. Josephine and Aubrey divorced in 1944. In March 1929, a student questionnaire was produced by sociology students at the University of Missouri asking for opinions on sex, marriage, divorce, gender equality, and other similar topics. This sparked statewide controversy and two professors, Harmon DeGraff and Max Friedrich Meyer, were fired, which provoked student protests and nationwide controversy. Birkhead polled his congregation, which unanimously disapproved of the firings, and so he began urging their reversal and had the entire questionnaire reprinted in the church's bulletin. With two other liberal religious leaders, he conducted an investigation which concluded that university president Stratton D. Brooks "ruled with the iron hand of bigotry and mailed fist of stupidity", and he also wrote a Little Blue Book on the matter. Brooks was eventually fired after the American Association of University Professors intervened.

Birkhead was an opponent of the Ku Klux Klan and similar groups, and he condemned the 1931 lynching of Raymond Gunn. Like most white residents of Kansas City, Birkhead was a white supremacist who also called for better conditions for Black people. He was part of a committee that supported building a new hospital in Kansas City for white people and giving the old hospital to Black people. The Kansas City American, a Black newspaper, said that Birkhead was well respected by Black Americans and Black churches because he was not racist, later saying that All Souls had proved itself a liberal church when Birkhead named three Black residents of Kansas City in a list of those who had enriched the lives of residents. Like most pro-science progressives prior to the implementation of the Final Solution, Birkhead was a proponent of eugenics who supported forceful efforts to decrease the number of "sub-normal" people.

=== Elmer Gantry ===
In January 1926, the American writer Sinclair Lewis came to Kansas City to research a novel critical of ministers and fundamental Christianity, what would eventually become Elmer Gantry. For novels on subjects that Lewis had little familiarity with, he often sought the aid of a subject-matter expert; for his 1925 critique of science culture, Arrowsmith, he received the aid of microbiologist Paul de Kruif. He came to Kansas City as it was the residence of Stidger, who had encouraged him to write a novel about preachers when they met on the Chautauqua circuit in 1922. Lewis planned for Stidger to be the subject-matter expert for Elmer Gantry, and Stidger spent a few weeks guiding Lewis around the city and introducing him to many ministers. There are conflicting accounts of how Birkhead and Lewis met. Biographers of Mencken say that he put forward Birkhead's name to serve as Lewis's aide. Birkhead knew of Lewis and had favorably reviewed his novels. Birkhead said he met Lewis at a party in January 1926 and Kahn said that Birkhead was introduced to Lewis by another minister. Biographers of Lewis generally conclude that Stidger brought Lewis into contact with Birkhead, possibly by bringing Lewis along to a meeting of the Southwest Federation of Religious Liberals, a group that Birkhead organized and which met semi-regularly.

At that meeting, Birkhead said that Lewis decided he wanted him to be his technical advisor, replacing Stidger. Before Lewis left Kansas City on January 28, it had been arranged that Birkhead would guide him when he returned in April. Lewis considered Birkhead's contribution to be similar to de Kruif's, although unlike de Kruif, who was an uncredited author of Arrowsmith and received 25% of its royalties, Birkhead did not write any of Elmer Gantry or receive any royalties. Various explanations have been put forward for why Lewis picked Birkhead. Birkhead thought Lewis picked him as he was able to smoke and swear in his presence. Lewis sometimes repeated that reasoning; on other occasions, he said that it was because Birkhead had a sense of humor and was knowledgeable about Eastern religions. In May 1926, Lewis would tell his publisher:

I couldn't have a better man than Birkhead to give me dope. Personally most charming as well as most learned, young enough to be comradely, he has had ten years as a Methodist preacher, ten as a Unitarian, both observantly; and though he doesn't even smoke, he enjoys language of the type made holy by Paul [de Kruif] and Spike [Hunt] and myself.

— Sinclair Lewis

Lewis returned in April and stayed at the Birkheads home. Lewis said he had most of the novel sketched out and Birkhead said Lewis had already begun working on an outline when Lewis arrived. Lewis had the Southwest Federation of Religious Liberals meet weekly on Sunday under his guidance. The group has since been referred to as "Sinclair Lewis's Sunday School Class" or "Sinclair Lewis's Laboratory", with its existence before Lewis arrived often forgotten. It was made up of about 15 ministers, mostly liberal, from disparate denominations; most were Protestant, but it included an agnostic leader of the Rationalist Society, a Roman Catholic priest, and Rabbi Samuel S. Mayerberg. Stidger was part of the group. It had few conservatives and no fundamentalists, with there being little record of Lewis meeting with any fundamentalists at all. Most writers conclude that it was largely made up of "charlatans and opportunists" or "clowns and hypocrites", while noting that Birkhead was "noble and good", although John Tyler Blake argued that these characterizations have little basis in fact. At the meetings, Lewis and the ministers would engage in discussions about religion and he would interrogate the morality of the ministers and attack them.

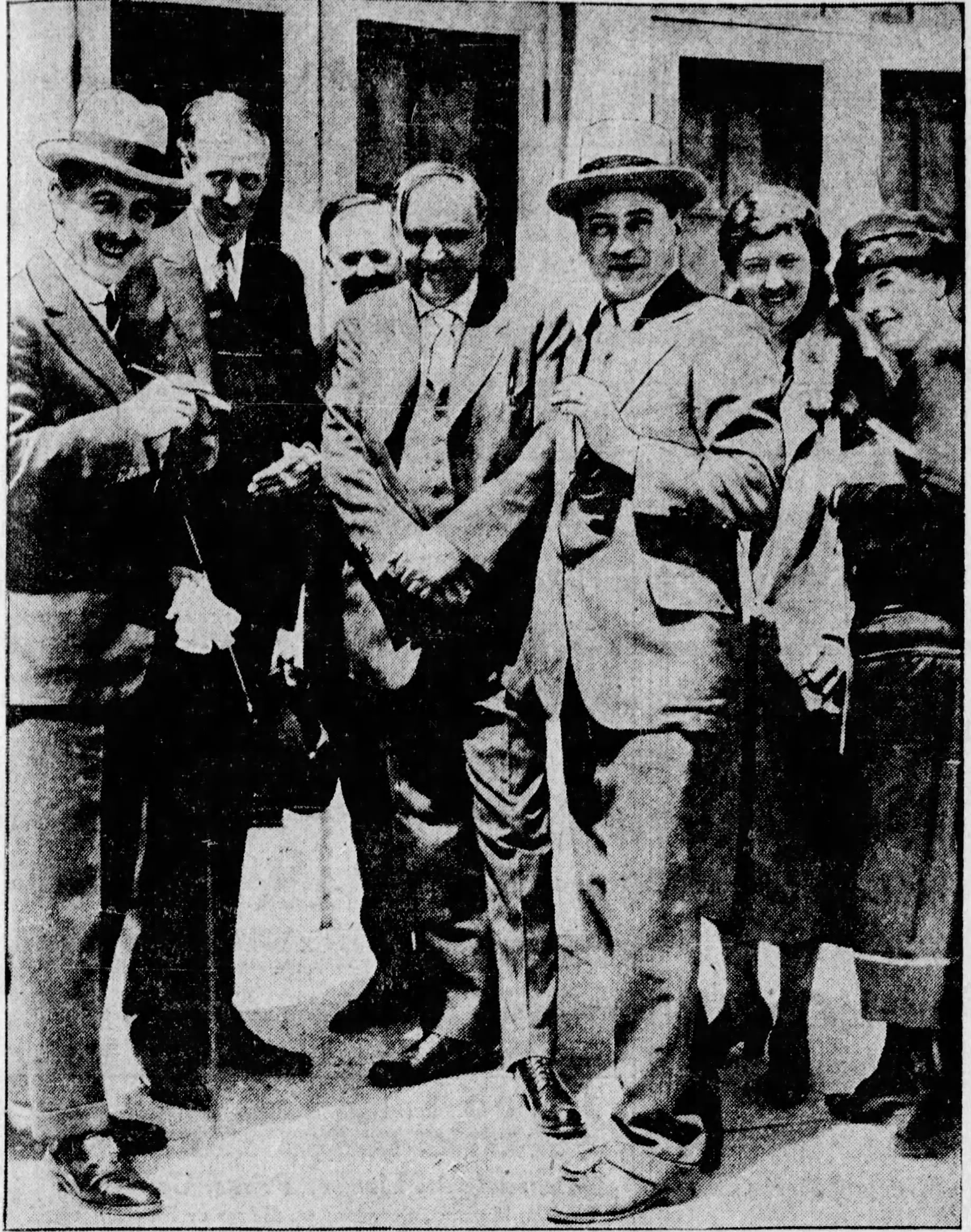
After a meeting of the Sunday School on May 16, 1926. From left to right: Gilbert Frankau, Sinclair Lewis, Birkhead, Clarence Darrow, Emanuel Haldeman-Julius, Agnes, and Darrow's wife.

Lewis's research included acquiring a library of about 200 books relating to ministry, nearly all of which were recommended by Birkhead. Also in April, Lewis was awarded and declined the 1926 Pulitzer Prize for Arrowsmith. Birkhead also recounted his own memories and experiences to Lewis. While he was in Kansas City, Lewis also gave various provocative speeches at various pulpits, beginning with a speech he delivered at All Souls that was nearly identical in substance to a speech Birkhead delivered in January. One April 18 speech in particular, where Lewis challenged God to strike him down, garnered significant attention. Lewis left Kansas City on May 15. I. M. Hargett, a minister who Lewis clashed with, would advertise multiple May sermons after Lewis left with the sentence "Sinclair Lewis and Dr. Birkhead writing a preacher book. Woe to us preachers".

Lewis came to rural Pequot Lakes, Minnesota, on June 3 to write the novel; the Birkhead family joined him a week later. Lewis and his Hawaiian chefs stayed in two tents while the Birkhead family stayed in a cabin nearby that Lewis had requisitioned from a friend. Lewis's nieces and Kenneth took a mutual interest in each other. Passersby recalled that the Birkheads stayed close to Lewis to help him write the novel, with Birkhead providing his knowledge and acting as a sounding board while Agnes worked as a stenographer and housekeeper. In late August, Lewis's father died; soon after Lewis and the Birkheads returned from his funeral, Lewis prepared to leave Pequot. Lewis's wife opposed his proposal that they travel Europe with Birkhead so he could finish the novel. The Birkheads soon left, with about one-half or two-thirds of the novel complete; Lewis finished the rest without them. In Kahn's profile, he says that Elmer Gantry was originally going to be dedicated to Birkhead, but Lewis thought it would ruin Birkhead if an anti-ministerial book was dedicated to him, an active minister. It was instead dedicated to their good friend Mencken. Lewis arranged it so that he was in Europe when Elmer Gantry was published in March 1927. He asked the Birkheads to join him, but Birkhead declined because he wanted to be in the United States when the novel was published.

Upon its publication, Elmer Gantry generated widespread controversy, including among Kansas City's ministers. Stidger attacked the novel as inaccurate, also saying that Lewis was drunk while writing it. Birkhead strenuously denied that claim; Lewis was drunk while writing large portions of it. Stidger accused Lewis of cowardice in not responding to him and accurately said that he was hiding in Europe. Lewis would privately write "Bill Stidger in his comments on my book must have been hit hard from the way he squeals! I shan't answer him; Birkhead will do that". Birkhead engaged in an exhaustive and extensive defense of Lewis and the novel, praising it as accurate and attacking Stidger. He was the novel's most active and energetic defender. Birkhead gained nationwide publicity and his congregation increased in size; only Lewis profited more from the novel. Most critics conclude that Birkhead was correct on the merits of the debate. Some members of All Souls left the church as a result of Birkhead's defense of the novel.

Many details in Elmer Gantry are derived from the Sunday School meetings, Birkhead's memories, and the books Birkhead provided. Birkhead is often put forward as the basis of the character Frank Shallard and he bears strong similarities to the character. Birkhead denied being the basis of Shallard. Birkhead also likely influenced the character Andrew Pengilly. John Tyler Blake, in his PhD dissertation on Elmer Gantry, noted multiple similarities between Birkhead and Elmer Gantry. Blake argued that the novel suffers greatly because Lewis wrote it under Birkhead's guidance, as he never came into contact with the fundamentalist ministers he intended to satirize. The portion of the novel written when Birkhead was not present is generally considered its most unrealistic.

=== A Humanist Manifesto ===
In the 1920s, Birkhead joined the emerging religious humanism movement. By 1933, the number of texts published in support of the movement had declined. Birkhead proposed to Raymond Bragg, editor of the magazine New Humanist and secretary of the Western Unitarian Conference, that the movement create a summary of its goals and ideology to convince people to join it and increase its popularity. Bragg would become the primary author of A Humanist Manifesto, published in 1933; Birkhead was one of at least five people consulted in its early drafting and authored a portion of the document. The manifesto was signed by 34 of the United States's leading humanists, including Birkhead. Bragg and another signatory, Lester Mondale, would later succeed Birkhead as minister of All Souls. Potter, another signatory, had called for a similar statement, but Bragg thought the document adhered closer to Birkhead's vision. In 1953, The Humanist magazine asked living signatories what they would change in it. Birkhead was one of the signatories to insist on little change to it, while some members supported removing its call for socialism. William F. Schulz, a later leader of the movement, believed that Birkhead's flair had prevented him from seriously influencing the movement and that he had only popularized it.

=== The Liberal Center ===
In April 1929, a celebration was held at All Souls to commemorate the 25th year of Birkhead's ministerial career; it featured congratulations from many liberals, including Jenkins, Emanuel Haldeman-Julius, Lewis, Mencken, and Darrow. Lewis visited Birkhead in 1933 and his February 4 sermon, dedicated to Lewis's novel Work of Art, was well-attended because Birkhead was known to be close with Lewis, who in the years since writing Elmer Gantry had become the first American to win the Nobel Prize in Literature. The Great Depression, which began in 1929, severely affected All Souls and it faced a financial crisis. By 1933, its donating members had significantly dwindled and its donations fell to less than a third of pre-Depression levels, and as of March Birkhead had not received his January and February salary. Many churches faced similar financial struggles and the AUA sent financial assistance. In April 1933, Sunday services were moved to the Madrid Theater, which had a larger capacity, and the first service there had an attendance of 574, the largest audience Birkhead ever spoke to and a 400 person increase from the week prior. During the northern fall of 1933, attendance averaged 253 compared to the 169 averaged the prior fall. Donations did not increase in kind and the services were moved back to the church by 1935. The church reached its lowest fiscal point in December 1933, before gradually recovering to its best post-Depression state in September 1936.

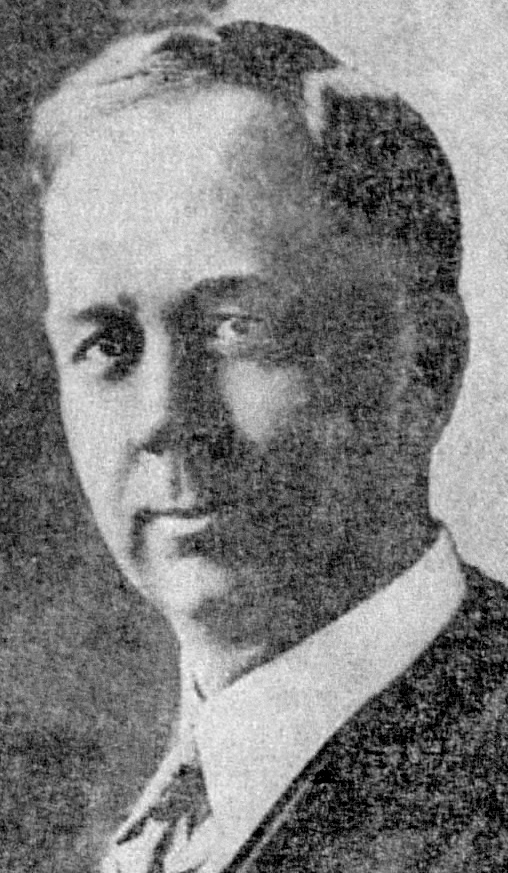
Birkhead c. 1927

All Souls Unitarian Church became increasingly secular in the 1930s, becoming unofficially known as "The Liberal Center". The name change was approved by 75% of congregants among other suggestions that mentioned its liberal, humanist, and egalitarian ideology. In 1933, congregants voted to dissolve the Sunday choir and Birkhead ceased to be the church's minister, instead becoming its "Speaker", a role he held until becoming its "Leader and Editor" in 1935. His Sunday sermons, which he renamed "addresses", became focused on current events and eschewed religion. One 1936 pamphlet described the church as follows: "A church without creed or prejudice; without fear of future punishment or plea for future reward. It asks no favors of deity; it has no dogma, and follows no ritual. Natural science is its guiding principle; it has been founded upon knowledge rather than belief; and is dedicated to the welfare of mankind." The church's secular drift was not approved by some congregants, who unsuccessfully attempted to form a more traditional Unitarian church at the urging of former AUA head Samuel A. Eliot. The center had various guest speakers, including Darrow, Sanger, Karl Menninger, and Logan Clendening.

== European travels ==
In 1931, Birkhead and his family spent two and a half months vacationing in Europe. While in Germany, Birkhead recalled many Germans telling him that Adolf Hitler and his Nazi Party were a transient political threat. Disgusted by Hitler's antisemitism, Birkhead began profiling fascist groups in the United States. Hitler assumed power in 1933; Birkhead was interested in the new Nazi regime and covered it in his lectures, which were variously titled "Hitler and the Jews", "And the Books Were Burned", "The Nazi Cult of the Blonds", and "Einstein vs. Hitler". In April 1935, doctors operated on Birkhead, removing a cancerous mass but telling him that it had spread to his bloodstream, and that he likely only had a year to live. At Agnes' encouragement, who wanted Birkhead to make the best of the time he had left, Birkhead took out a loan and planned a six-week solo visit to Nazi Germany and the Soviet Union. Birkhead said he planned to visit those countries because he opposed the attacks on minorities perpetrated by their governments.

Birkhead entered Germany in July 1935, after a brief visit to Fascist Italy. He recalled witnessing various acts of antisemitism in the country, such as a long-nosed Turk waving his passport mid-beating on the Kurfürstendamm after a mob mistook him for a Jew. Birkhead partially attributed the violence to Julius Streicher, an antisemitic publisher nicknamed "Jew Baiter Number 1", and his desire to increase the circulation of his newspaper Der Stürmer. Streicher would later be convicted of crimes against humanity at the Nuremberg trials and executed in 1946. Birkhead planned to investigate Streicher and sought the counsel of Louis P. Lochner, bureau chief of the Berlin office of the Associated Press (AP). Lochner advised against investigating Streicher, as his reporters had been unable to uncover anything; Henry Haskell, a former congregant and president of The Kansas City Star who was coincidentally in Berlin, told Birkhead that he might as well investigate Streicher since he was in Germany.

Birkhead traveled to Nuremberg and discovered Streicher's secret office. Streicher was not in the city and so Birkhead met with Paul Wurm, Der Stürmer's foreign editor, and discussed Streicher's plan to eradicate Jewry. Wurm showed Birkhead a large amount of anti-Jewish propaganda from various countries, bragging that "we know how to convince people". Birkhead thought Wurm did so because he was boastful and wanted to convince Birkhead to join the cause, while some of Birkhead's friends though it was more likely he was perceived as "a harmless and bumbling tourist". After Wurm said that he had a list of Nazi groups and sympathizers in the United States, Birkhead asked for proof. Wurm showed him folders filled with the names of groups and people Wurm identified as sympathizers; after he had left Wurm's presence, Birkhead scrambled to write down as many names as he could remember. Birkhead wrote an account of his visit for the AP, revealing Streicher's plan and outing some of the Nazi sympathizers, which was syndicated across the United States. (Note: In 1971, Wurm asked Agnes for a copy of the article. She declined to provide it.) Birkhead was disappointed when the article had little impact. The AP withheld publication of it until Birkhead had left Germany for the Soviet Union. His time in the Soviet Union was uneventful, except for a moment when a government agent saw a Star article in his belongings and concluded that Birkhead was carrying alien literature. Birkhead made a dangerous return to Germany after briefly visiting Sweden, spending a few days in Hamburg before beginning his return to the United States.

== Friends of Democracy ==
=== Before Pearl Harbor ===
==== Founding and organization ====
After returning from Germany, Birkhead began interviewing the Nazis and pro-fascists named in Wurm's files and became convinced that fascism was a threat to the United States. Birkhead's focus on fascism meant he became less focused on The Liberal Center, with the center implementing a Sunday guest speaker once a month in late 1936 so Birkhead could speak to other groups; the center's finances still struggled. In December 1937, Birkhead called a meeting where he agreed to a pay cut to improve the financial situation and it was decided that he would serve until the northern summer of 1938; in the northern fall of 1938 he tendered his resignation, effective May 1, 1939. Church records indicate that he was owed $6,999 in backpay when his resignation was made effective; they also indicate that the general sentiment of congregants was sadness about Birkhead leaving but feeling that they had no right to keep him from fighting fascism. Soon after returning from Germany, (Note: Birkhead gave varying accounts of the year. In 1947, Birkhead said it was founded in 1937, a Friends of Democracy publication declared that it was founded in 1935, and the group celebrated its eleventh anniversary. Jim Grebe dates it as being founded on November 1, 1937, while Thomas Howell notes the inconsistencies and dates it to 1936.) Birkhead founded the Friends of Democracy (FOD), a pro-democracy, anti-fascist, and interventionist propaganda and educational group dedicated to "fighting all forms of bigotry and oppression". Lewis chose the group's name. Birkhead would serve as the organization's national director, guiding its activity, acting as its spokesman, and frequently writing its publications. He assembled a large collection of American extremist publications, filing them with the help of volunteers.

During the 1930s, liberals organized into a large number of groups to combat right-wing extremism, including the Non-Sectarian Anti-Nazi League, the Movement for Democracy, the Council for Democracy, the American Council Against Nazi Propaganda, and the Council Against Intolerance. Many of these groups were ephemeral, while the FOD was the most successful. The group established its first headquarters at 909 Walnut Street in Kansas City before later moving it to 818 Grand Avenue. The FOD sought formal incorporation in January 1939. Birkhead was named its secretary and executive director, Kansas City Congregationalist minister Joseph C. Cleveland its president, and Kansas City banker E. E. Morris its treasurer. The FOD was incorporated in Missouri, as an educational organization. The names noted as belonging to the FOD's executive committee when it petitioned for incorporation are:

- Louis Bromfield
- Van Wyck Brooks
- Patrick H. Callahan
- Anton Julius Carlson
- James McKeen Cattell
- David Cushman Coyle
- Will Durant
- Luther Gulick
- Jay William Hudson
- Eduard C. Lindeman
- Robert Millikan
- Peter H. Odegard
- Westbrook Pegler
- John S. Penman
- Edward A. Steiner
- Arthur J. Todd
- Albert E. Wiggam

23 individuals, including many of the 17 mentioned above, served on the initial executive committee. Some of those not mentioned above who served on the first executive committee were Lee de Forest, Paul Douglas, John Dewey, and Thomas Mann. The names of executive committee members were printed on the FOD's letterhead and Birkhead recruited them as they were prominent individuals – for instance, Mann and Millikan were Nobel laureates – who guaranteed the group publicity and provided it some initial legitimacy. Bromfield, a Pulitzer Prize-winning novelist, quickly replaced Cleveland as the FOD's president. Many of the initial executive members eventually left the FOD, with some becoming harsh critics. On February 1, 1940, the FOD established a regional office at 103 Park Avenue in New York City, later moving to 135 East 57th Street; soon after the New York City office was established, Birkhead moved to New York. In New York, the FOD greatly expanded.

The group's main headquarters and center of distribution was in Kansas City. That office was under the management of Agnes. Kahn said that Birkhead and Agnes remained on good terms and were only separated because it was necessary for the group's operation. It also had satellite offices with allied organizations in Boston and Chicago. The New York office was the busiest and had 22 staff members in 1947. The group also set up local chapters and a women's division. Over its lifetime, the FOD distributed 50,000,000 pieces of literature and Birkhead averaged 300 speeches each year. Birkhead called propaganda "the most effective weapon developed in modern times" and told Americans to "grow up" and stop regarding it as evil. He termed his strategy of publishing propaganda targeting extremists "pitiless publicity". Kenneth worked at the FOD before he became an officer in the army in 1942 and after his service ended in 1946; in his final role, he was executive director of its New York office.

==== Early activity ====
Birkhead spoke to many groups across the Midwest to recount the antisemitism he witnessed in Germany, "a reversion to the barbarism of the Dark Ages", and attack the Nazi groups in the United States. The speeches were designed to make headlines. One speech in Sedalia, Missouri, led the city's local newspaper, the Sedalia Democrat, to declare "Monday was a bewildering day for many Sedalians. The Fascists, Nazis, and Communists came in for verbal cudgelling against which even a medieval cuirass would not have been impenetrable." Early on, Birkhead protested American involvement in the 1936 Berlin Olympics and called for the U.S. to exchange Americans belonging to the Friends of New Germany with German Jews. In 1937, Birkhead testified before the House Judiciary Committee with a suitcase filled with extremist pamphlets. In 1939, Birkhead gained national attention after he identified 800 groups he alleged were distributing pro-Nazi materials. U.S. Secretary of State Cordell Hull asked for the complete list, but it appears that Birkhead only provided a partial list.

The first person to be directly targeted by the FOD was Gerald Burton Winrod, a fundamentalist preacher who Birkhead had clashed with over evolution. Winrod came to write The Defender newspaper and he founded the Defenders of the Christian Faith, both fundamentalist organizations. In an early issue of The Defender, Winrod evaluated Birkhead as "a delightful person to talk with, possessing every evidence of education and refinement." In the 1930s, Winrod became increasingly antisemitic, anti-Catholic, and pro-Nazi, gaining the moniker "Jayhawk Nazi". Winrod featured extensively in Streicher's files. He declared his candidacy for the Republican nomination in the 1938 U.S. Senate election in Kansas, becoming the frontrunner. Birkhead was Winrod's most ardent and effective critic. Birkhead attacked Winrod as being affiliated with Hitler and funded by Nazis. Birkhead provided information on Winrod to journalist Dorothy Thompson and the ACLU. Birkhead and some Kansas clergy organized into the Kansas Friends of Democracy and they published two pamphlets condemning Winrod, What's Wrong With Winrod and Drive Fascism from Kansas. Birkhead personally contacted Alf Landon, the former governor of Kansas and Republican nominee in the 1936 presidential election, to inform him about Winrod's past statements. Landon contacted John Hamilton, chairman of the Republican National Committee, who repudiated Winrod, and establishment Republicans rallied to defeat him. Winrod ultimately placed a distant third in the election. He blamed Birkhead for his defeat, calling him a "professional snooper", questioning his Christianity, and later charging that he had been prosecuted.

After Winrod was defeated, the next target of the FOD was Charles Coughlin, a Roman Catholic priest known as "Father Coughlin". After gaining national renown in his radio broadcasts as a supporter of President Franklin D. Roosevelt, Coughlin left the political mainstream and started trading in antisemitism. Coughlin came to Birkhead's attention after his November 20, 1938, broadcast – the first after Kristallnacht – where Coughlin accused Jewry of various crimes, earning him praise from Nazis and sparking nationwide demonstrations against Jews. Birkhead condemned Coughlin as a demagogue and "national menace", the latter while speaking at the Progressive Education Association in Coughlin's home-city of Detroit. In March 1940, the FOD distributed a pamphlet, Father Coughlin—Self-Condemned, to 15,000 Catholic leaders across the United States. The pamphlet effectively noted the lack of differences between statements made by Coughlin and Nazi propagandist Joseph Goebbels. Birkhead contacted the National Association of Broadcasters, demanding they take him off air. Coughlin was eventually forced off the air in 1940, with the FOD bearing some responsibility. The attacks on Coughlin garnered the FOD nationwide publicity, expanding its donor base from beyond Kansas and Missouri. In June 1941, Birkhead telegrammed Hull to ask if Francis Moran, leader of the Coughlinite Christian Front, had registered as a foreign agent after being hired by the German consul. His telegram led Hull to declare that he would keep a close eye on the group.

After World War II began in September 1939, the FOD published America's Little Hitlers: Who's Who and What's Up in U.S. Fascism, which exposed the racism in the Anglo-Saxon Federation of America and seven other racists. One of Birkhead's perennial targets was Gerald L. K. Smith, an antisemite and right-wing former ally of Huey Long who ran for president under America First in 1944 and later erected the Christ of the Ozarks. Birkhead published many exposés targeting him, including the pamphlets Yankee Doodle Hitler and Pattern for Revolution. The dislike was mutual and Smith called Birkhead "one of the most villainous men of this generation". The FOD's provocative attacks gave it a large amount of publicity and generated contributions, and it never ran out of isolationists, antisemites, racists, and fascists to oppose. In 1940, the FOD targeted Joe McWilliams, a Republican candidate to represent New York's 18th congressional district in the U.S. House of Representatives, publishing a pamphlet titled The Case Against Joe McWilliams and mailing it to all Republicans in the district. McWilliams lost in a landslide. Among the FOD's other targets were Joseph P. Kamp of the Constitutional Educational League and Allen Zoll of the National Council for American Education.

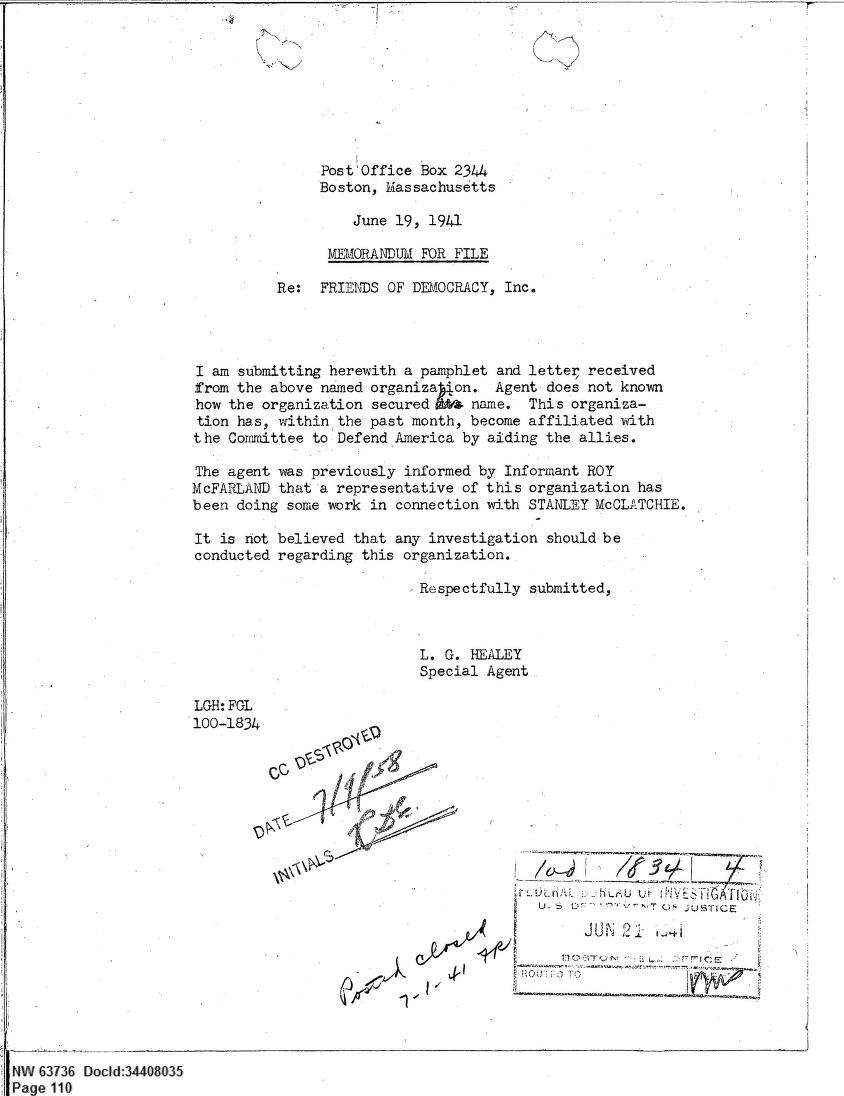
FBI communiqué on the FOD, June 1941

==== America First Committee ====
After the outbreak of World War II, controversy emerged in the United States between isolationists, who opposed the U.S. entering the war, and interventionists, who supported the U.S. entering the war. Polls found a strong majority of Americans supported isolationism, with some November 1941 polls finding that only 25% of Americans supported entering the war. Birkhead was a fierce interventionist and had called for the U.S. to wage war on Nazi Germany as early as 1938, although the FOD declared no stance on the issue. Proponents of isolationism were varied, including pacifists, socialists, conservative businessmen, concerned citizens, nationalists, and fascists. In 1940, isolationists organized into a single group, the America First Committee (AFC). Before the AFC had begun any major activity, Birkhead attacked it as being supported by "all the communists and fascists". In late 1941, the AFC had 450 chapters and 800,000 members; its support was centered around Chicago and its core constituency was conservative businessmen, with it including many prominent Americans. Birkhead professed no opposition to "high-minded" anti-war groups, such as Quakers, although those groups lacked the ability to counter interventionists.

Interventionists did not have a similar umbrella group to oppose the AFC. However, the Century Group was a group of influential interventionist New Yorkers who met weekly to coordinate their efforts; it included Birkhead, Committee to Defend America by Aiding the Allies leader Ernest W. Gibson Jr., Raymond Gram Swing of the Council for Democracy, and Lewis Mumford of American Friends of German Freedom. The Century Group eventually evolved into the larger and more aggressive Fight for Freedom Committee in April 1941, which became Freedom House in 1942. Birkhead become close friends with Fight for Freedom's spokesman, Rex Stout, and Stout succeeded Bromfield as president of the FOD in 1942. Working together, the FOD and Fight for Freedom issued zealous and effective attacks on isolationists. One historian concluded that the FOD issued "some of the most outspoken, persistent, and disturbing attacks" on the AFC, with another saying that it was tougher and more aggressive than Fight for Freedom. After the AFC was dealt a defeat with the passage of Lend-Lease in March 1941, the FOD published a pamphlet targeting the group, The America First Committee—The Nazi Transmission Belt, which argued that the AFC was a front used by Nazis to spread Nazism. The pamphlet highlighted the similarities between statements made by AFC leaders and Hitler, a technique that Birkhead favored; it also listed the "un-American" organizations whose members had attended an AFC rally, and quoted "the official Nazi seal of approval" given to the AFC. Birkhead said that the AFC was run by "very naive, simple-minded people" who had fallen for Nazi propaganda and the pamphlet urged the AFC to reorganize in some manner to stop Nazis from taking advantage of it.

AFC leaders were outraged by the pamphlet. John T. Flynn, an AFC leader, called the pamphlet "the most shocking" of "all the outrageous smears" targeted at the AFC. The FOD's sponsors had not seen the pamphlet before it was published and Flynn said that 9 of the 11 sponsors had disapproved of it when the AFC asked; Birkhead said that the AFC's inquiry was flawed as it was premised on the pamphlet accusing AFC leaders of supporting Nazis, when he said it only said they were being used by Nazis. Carlson, a member of the executive committee of both the FOD and AFC, resigned his seat on the FOD's board in a letter which attacked Birkhead. AFC leaders debated among themself over whether the national headquarters should reply to the pamphlet; while some leaders replied individually and the decision was not unanimous, the executive committee eventually decided that replying would only publicize the attack and "play into Birkhead's hands". After Birkhead issued another attack in April, AFC president Robert E. Wood raised the question again, and AFC leaders again decided against replying. During its lifetime, the AFC's national headquarters decided against replying to its major critics: Fight for Freedom and the FOD.

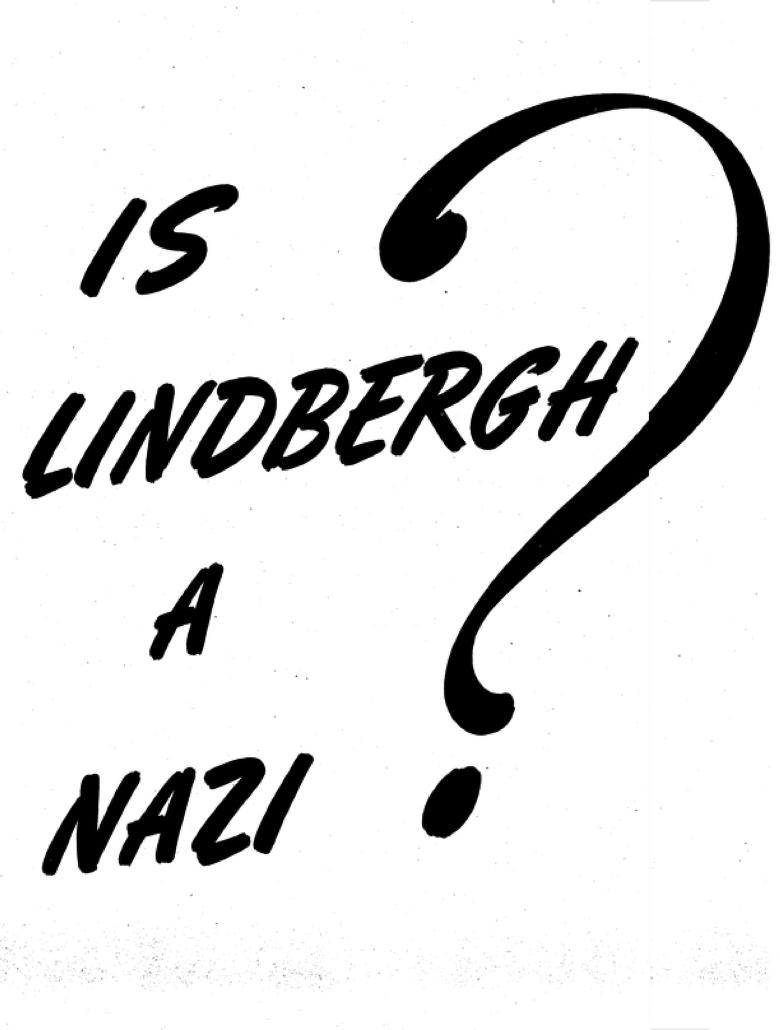
Cover of a 1941 propaganda pamphlet targeting Charles Lindbergh

Charles Lindbergh, an aviator and national hero, was the most prominent member of the AFC. Birkhead and other interventionists found Lindbergh particularly dangerous and attacked him as being too friendly with Nazi leadership and said that he was ignoring the threat posed by Hitler. Kenneth said his father targeted Lindbergh primarily because of Lindbergh's popularity and not any particular ideological stance. In 1941, the FOD issued two pamphlets against Lindbergh: Hitler and Lindbergh Are Spiritual Brothers under the Skin and Is Lindbergh a Nazi?. The question posed in Is Lindbergh a Nazi? was rhetorical and the pamphlet, which was distributed by Fight for Freedom, was designed to show that Lindbergh was repeating Nazi propaganda. It included 57 newspapers clippings on Lindbergh's pro-German views, praise to Lindbergh from fascists, noted that he had accepted a medal from Hermann Göring, and it noted his antisemitic and isolationist views. As was typical of Birkhead's statements, it also overstated Lindbergh's power, charging that Lindbergh was personally responsible for British Prime Minister Neville Chamberlain's policy of appeasement culminating in the Munich Agreement. Birkhead had about 100 members of the FOD and two student groups picket a Lindbergh speech at an AFC rally in April; the FOD gained publicity when the picketers escaped relatively unharmed after isolationists attacked them.

On December 7, 1941, the Empire of Japan launched a surprise attack on Pearl Harbor naval base, bringing the United States into World War II. This effectively ended the debate between isolationists and interventionists. The AFC disbanded on December 10, one day before Germany and Italy declared war on the United States. About 50 members of the now-disbanded AFC, including Lindbergh, met on December 17 at the home of New York chapter secretary Edwin S. Webster Jr., with accounts of the meeting differing from that of a farewell dinner to a meeting to plan the future of the AFC so it could reemerge and advocate a negotiated peace. Birkhead and other interventionists publicized the meeting, garnering the attention of Roosevelt and his administration and sparking an FBI investigation into the AFC.

=== World War II ===
After the U.S. entered the war, the FOD returned to its roots of fighting extremists, racists, and antisemites. One of the most prominent individuals it targeted was Henry Ford, an industrialist who had become one of the most successful and influential antisemites in the 1920s, publishing The International Jew, before a libel suit in 1927 forced an apology of dubious sincerity and cessation of such activities. The FOD demanded that Ford take action to stop groups like the KKK from continuing to spread The International Jew. After Ford did so, the FOD and other groups continued to call on him to repudiate his past antisemitism, annoying Ford. Birkhead reconnected with Lewis in 1941. Lewis was writing a novel on the various isolationist and interventionist groups that had emerged during the interwar, which he termed philanthrobbers (a portmanteau of philanthropist and robber), arguing that the organizations were not philanthropic. Birkhead provided extensive information on the groups, with Lewis teasingly calling him a "windmill tilter" and frequently visiting Birkhead until the novel, Gideon Planish, was published in 1943.

In November 1942, the FOD temporarily merged with the Coordinating Committee for Democratic Action to unify the command structure of pro-democracy groups. The FOD also had close ties with the Writers' War Board (WWB), often cooperating and also sharing members and a leader in Stout; the WWB was a quasi-governmental propaganda group partially funded by the Office of War Information. The FOD assisted multiple efforts of the WWB, such as its "Hate Germany" campaign and effort to promote the Morgenthau Plan, which called for the deindustrialization of Germany. After the war ended and the WWB lost government funding, it at one point became the "Writers' Board of the Friends of Democracy". Some historians conclude that the FOD and similar groups were directed by the Roosevelt administration, while others say that the administration only cooperated with such groups and did not direct them. Some historians have concluded that the FOD was formed and controlled by British intelligence. Such conclusions are complicated by the FOD predating World War II and by Birkhead's history of anti-fascist activism. Historical documents supportive of the claim are vague and dubious.

During its prime, the FOD usually had an annual budget of $150,000 ($2.16 million in 2025). About half of its annual funds were usually raised at a dinner fundraiser, often held at the elite Waldorf Astoria hotel in New York City. The dinners included reports on the FOD's activities, appearances by famous allies of Birkhead, impersonations of right-wing figures, and sometimes an "Ignoble Prize", offered to "the American who has done least for democracy". As the FOD opposed antisemitism and fascism, a large portion of its membership was made of Jews. During the war, the FOD received praise from Eleanor Roosevelt and more prominent individuals joined its executive committee, including Philip Murray, Frank Porter Graham, and Mary McLeod Bethune. Birkhead became too recognizable and was unable to investigate fascist groups, instead enlisting volunteers to investigate groups he found suspicious. In 1942, Birkhead chaired the Nonpartisan Committee to Defeat Hamilton Fish, a powerful and wealthy isolationist congressman. The group was probably aided by British intelligence efforts but failed to defeat Fish.

The FOD's files on extremist literature had over 20,000 sources and were well organized. They were consulted by the Federal Bureau of Investigation, the State Department, Justice Department, and the Library of Congress. The Institute for Propaganda Analysis (IPA) also consulted the files and studied them to help create the means with which it analyzed propaganda. The IPA used the files for other means as well and Birkhead also provided it with 14 illustrations that were used in a study, with retroactive analyzes of it finding that the illustrations gave the study a "powerful punch". The FOD sometimes pressured politicians by publishing telegrams it had sent to them, garnering press coverage and forcing the politicians to clearly state their position. The FOD also sponsored three weekly broadcasts on WEVD and its representatives appeared on other radio broadcasts. Birkhead expressed his excitement for the Great Sedition Trial, where 30 right-wingers were charged with sedition under the Smith Act. Many of those charged were past targets of Birkhead. The prosecutor gathered boxes of propaganda from the FOD to use in the trial and recruited Birkhead to testify. The affair ended in a mistrial and without any convictions.

==== Newsletter and Under Cover ====
In January 1943, the FOD began distributing a semimonthly newsletter, Propaganda Battlefront, renamed to Friends of Democracy's Battle in November 1946. The standard newsletter had two features on fascist-related activities and shorter articles on fascist groups. In 1947, about 11,000 people were subscribed to it. The FOD and WWB promoted anti-fascist works and these promotions helped make two works by FOD members best-sellers. Henry Hoke, an expert on direct mail and an editor of the newsletter, published Black Mail in 1944, which alleged a Nazi plot to turn direct mail into an "instrument of destruction". In 1939, Birkhead met Arthur Derounian, an anti-fascist investigator; he consulted daily with the group and was hired as its chief investigator. Historian Thomas Howell evaluated Derounian as the FOD's third-most important member, behind Stout and Birkhead, and Derounian provided much of the material for the FOD's propaganda alongside Evelyn Brand, the group's director of congressional research. Derounian had spent a few years infiltrating isolationist, right-wing, antisemitic, and fascist circles. In 1943, Derounian published Under Cover under the pseudonym John Roy Carlson, a recounting of his yearslong infiltration and exposé of fascism. It was occasionally factual and sought to prove a widespread fascist conspiracy among isolationists; the book sold over a million copies, the most of any anti-fascist exposé, and presented a frightening vision of fascist movements which led it to become the center of national debate. Fight for Freedom also promoted Under Cover and they helped Birkhead appear on the radio to respond to Senator Burton K. Wheeler's criticisms of the book.

==== Chicago Tribune and New York Daily News ====
Before, during, and after World War II, Birkhead and the FOD attacked the Chicago Tribune and New York Daily News. The Tribune was owned by Robert R. McCormick and the Daily News was owned by his cousin Joseph Medill Patterson. Both men were isolationists and both newspapers were critical of Roosevelt, critical of the war effort, and supportive of antisemitism. Birkhead was also critical of Patterson's sister Cissy, owner of the Washington Times-Herald, and media magnate William Randolph Hearst. Birkhead's old friend H. L. Mencken cautioned him against making an enemy of McCormick. After Birkhead began his attacks on the newspapers, Mencken criticized his actions in their regular correspondence as an afront to freedom of speech and freedom of the press. Birkhead defended himself and they debated the issue for several years, otherwise remaining on friendly terms. The Tribune and Daily News were harsh critics of the FOD and attacked Birkhead as a communist, "free-love parson", falsely alleged that he had been fired by the Liberal Center, and alleged that he extracted profit from the FOD.

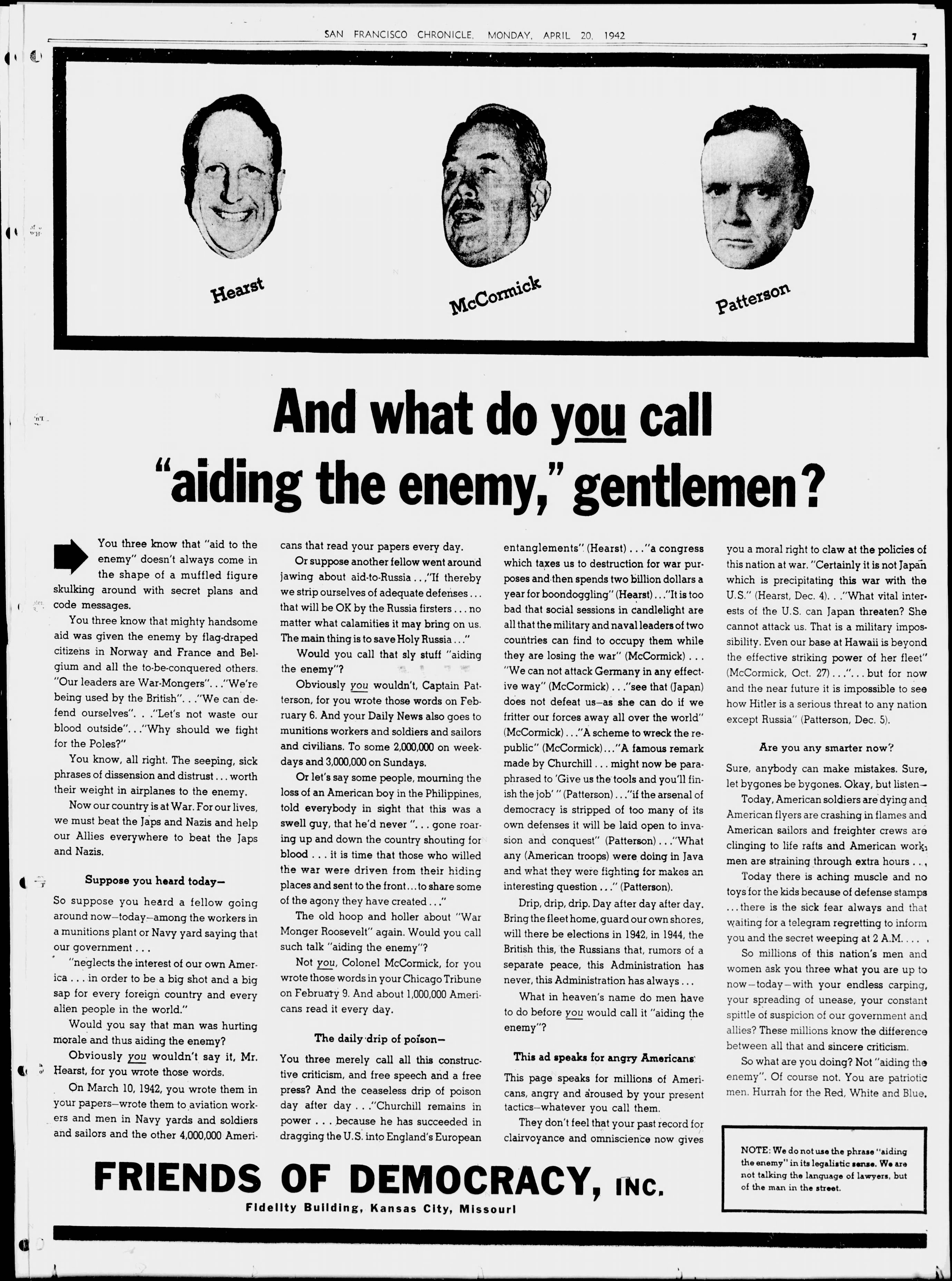
Propaganda advertisement in the San Francisco Chronicle targeting Hearst, McCormick, and Patterson

In May 1942, the FOD ran a full-page advertisement in the San Francisco Chronicle and New York's PM condemning and quoting rhetoric of McCormick, Patterson, and Hearst that was critical of Roosevelt and the war effort. In Kahn's profile, he reports that The New York Times and Herald-Tribune refused to run it. An advertisement exclusively targeted at McCormick later ran in the Chicago Sun. Birkhead would have a member of the FOD, usually Kenneth, buy an early edition of the Daily News, with the FOD printing and handing out rebuttals to editorials it disagreed with next to newspaper stands. This later evolved into the FOD sending its response to editorials straight to advertisers, in an effort to pressure them to cease placing them in the Daily News. After multiple tours of the Midwest led Birkhead to conclude that the Tribune bore some responsibility for its isolationist sentiment, Stout and him wrote two open letters designed to expose the Tribune's pro-fascism and reverse its impact. The Tribune did not print either of the open letters, but sharply responded to the second. In 1945, the FOD and Emanuel Haldeman-Julius published a pamphlet by Birkhead, The Case Against the McCormick-Patterson Press.

==== Impact ====
Historian Leo Ribuffo concluded that, by 1943, the FOD had become the preeminent source of information on fascists and isolationists. No contemporaries of the FOD analyzed the effectiveness of its propaganda and, given the other groups it coordinated with, the impact of the group overall is unclear. Howell concluded that the group uniquely and valuably documented a wide variety of extremist materials. One historian critical of the FOD said that it "raised brown-smearing to something of a fine art". Howell and another historian agreed an assessing Birkhead as "one of the most respected and energetic anti-Fascist investigators". Historian Wayne S. Cole concluded that the FOD used "decisive" and "ruthlessly effective" tactics to defeat isolationists. Kahn reported that the FOD was generally considered more militant than its contemporaries, such as the Anti-Defamation League of B'nai B'rith (ADL), the Non-Sectarian Anti-Nazi League, and the Council Against Intolerance in America.

=== Post-war decline, McCarthyism, and death ===
After the end of World War II and the destruction of most fascist governments, Birkhead continued to fear a right-wing resurgence. This fear was not without merit. After the death of Roosevelt, an ally to Jews, in April 1945, polls found a surge in antisemitism among Americans. Lindbergh gave his first public statement since the outbreak of war, to the Tribune. Nationalist groups soon began reorganizing into American Action, which had similar goals and leadership to the AFC. The FOD fundraised for $250,000 ($4.13 million in 2025) to oppose the group, generalizing it as a "post-war coalition of Coughlinites, bigots, Fascist-sympathizers, White Supremacy advocates, and super-Nationalists". Flynn, American Action's leader, responded to the attacks by Birkhead and similar groups with a series of articles in the Tribune, "The Smear Terror"; Flynn dedicated a significant portion of the articles to the FOD and Birkhead, arguing that they smeared those who opposed Birkhead under the premise of opposing Hitler. Birkhead frequently appeared on America's Town Meeting of the Air to argue that a fascist revival was a serious threat. However, the House Un-American Activities Committee (HUAC) and Senator Joseph McCarthy soon ignited the Second Red Scare. The FOD's continued focus on fascism would be its downfall, as the public was much more concerned with communism. Birkhead said he feared anti-communist hysteria and opponents of the United Nations and Marshall Plan more than he feared communism.

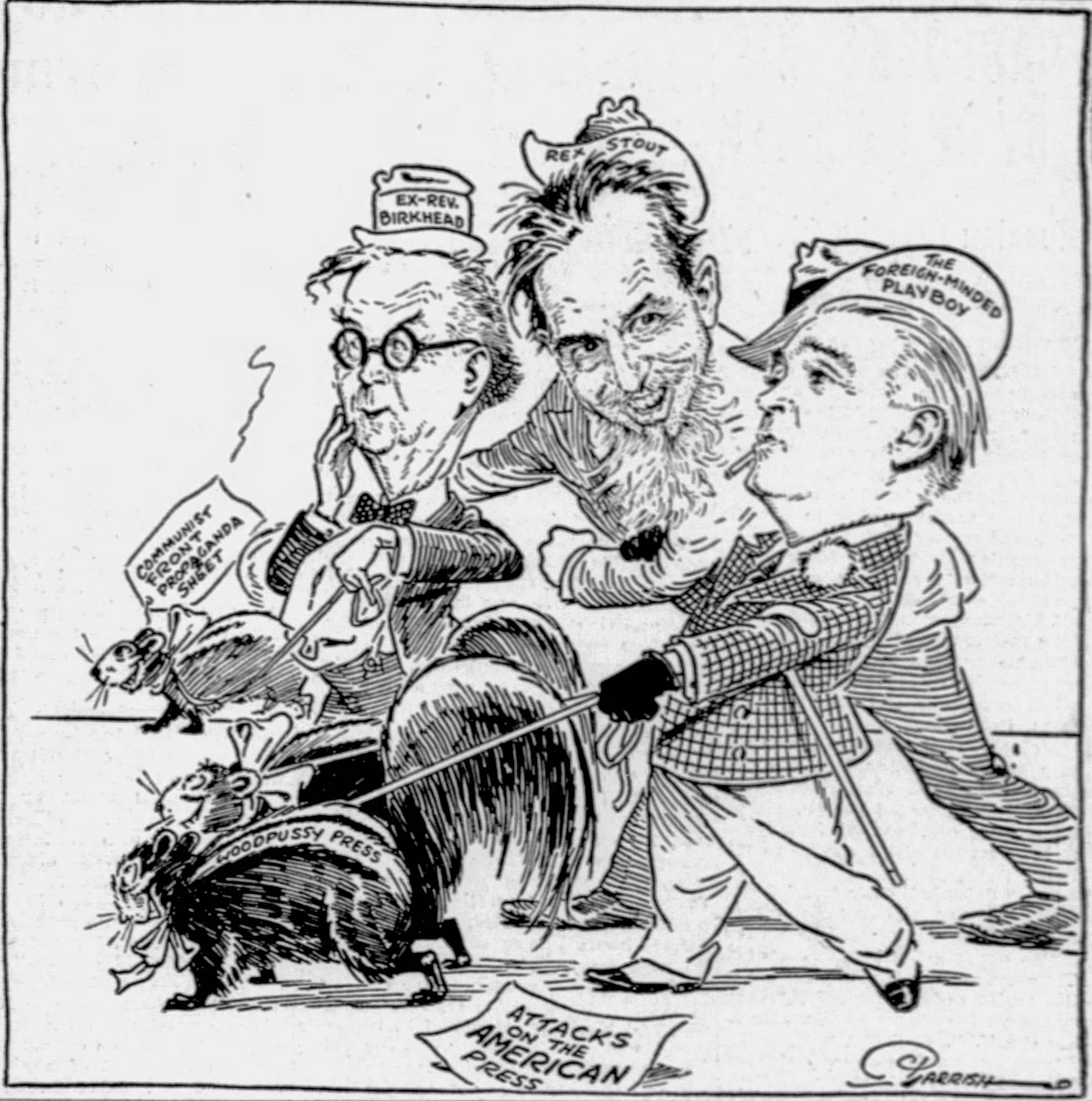
March 1945 political cartoon in the Chicago Tribune attacking Birkhead, Stout, and "The Foreign Minded Playboy" as communists (Note: Sources differ on whether "The Foreign Minded Playboy" was Roosevelt or Marshall Field III, publisher of the Sun and PM.)

Birkhead was the subject of a friendly three-part profile in The New Yorker by Ely Jacques Kahn Jr. in 1947, which boosted his reputation. Kahn focused a large portion of the article on denying that Birkhead was a communist and saying that he was as opposed to communism as he was to fascism. Kahn cited Birkhead's encyclopedic knowledge of communist groups, various anti-communist activities, the weakness of a dossier on him compiled by the HUAC, negative statements on him from communist newspapers, and a positive statement from Frederick Woltman, a journalist awarded the 1947 Pulitzer Prize for his anti-communist articles. Kahn said that the FOD had focused on fascism as Birkhead viewed it as the greater threat and because he felt it was a better use of time, given the abundance of newly-formed anti-communist groups and the inattention given to fascism. Birkhead was criticized by the left as a reactionary engaging in red-baiting. The right criticized Birkhead as a Pole, slanderer, communist, and Jew, the latter two considered interchangeable.

Birkhead rarely faced opportunities to attack the far-left. In May 1947, Stephen H. Fritchman, a Unitarian minister and editor of the AUA's magazine, The Christian Register, was controversially fired after it was alleged that the magazine was sympathetic to communism. Birkhead published a report in the Register's October edition, concurring that the magazine under Fritchman had supported communism. Birkhead supported the creation of the Attorney General's List of Subversive Organizations and urged victory in the Cold War. In 1947, the FOD's women division expanded to have over 1,000 members, many working as researchers. The research division answered over 5,000 questions in 1947. In 1947, it also produced two articles: How to Identify an American Communist and How to Recognize an American Pro-Fascist. Both publications were very successful, entering the school curriculum in several states and being reprinted in many newspapers and magazines. That year, the FOD said its members had participated in 100 radio programs that had 15 million total listeners, made 500 public appearances with a total audience of 150,000, distributed 500,000 pieces of propaganda, and said its newspaper and sponsored-publications had reached 20 million Americans. The group also began a campaign against conservative commentator Upton Close; Close's radio program shut down, which Birkhead called a significant victory.

The FOD reached its zenith in 1947. While critics of the FOD had always alleged it was controlled by a foreign power, communists, or Jews, such claims gradually increased in frequency. In 1947, New York City alderman Lambert Fairchild, who Birkhead called antisemitic, sued for libel. Birkhead was frequently sued for libel but had previously successfully defended himself. He defended his right to call Fairchild an antisemite and disregarded advice from his attorney to tone down his statements. The judge presiding over the trial did not agree that Birkhead had a right to call Fairchild an antisemite and opened a grand jury investigation. While the grand jury did not ultimately convict Birkead, he and the FOD were forced to tone down remarks, defanging the group and its ability to gain publicity and fundraising. Also in 1947, the U.S. Treasury Department stripped the FOD of its tax-exempt status, retroactive to 1942. They ruled that the group was not an educational group but instead a political propaganda group. The FOD desperately fundraised to save itself but by the time the decision was reversed and the tax-exempt status was restored, the FOD had significantly damaged its relationship with donors. Smith, Birkhead's antisemitic archrival, testified that Birkhead was a communist before HUAC. Evangelists and businessmen in Knoxville, Tennessee, attacked Birkhead on this basis and several speeches he was set to deliver were cancelled.

As the FOD declined, so did Birkhead and he became dissatisfied with his circumstances. In 1948, Kenneth left the FOD to work on President Harry S. Truman's election campaign. Birkhead became estranged from Agnes. He came to resent his ally, the ADL, saying that it had told supporters of both it and the FOD to focus on supporting the ADL, as Birkhead was past his prime. In 1950, the FOD's Kansas City office was shut down and its New York office moved to smaller quarters, shutting down three years later. Birkhead was left as the only member of the FOD. After 1952, Birkhead's only writing was published in the column "What's Happening on the Propaganda Front" for the magazine Exposé. He continued to target his old right-wing opponents, while also targeting HUAC and McCarthy. He identified McCarthy's supporters as antisemites and anti-Black racists.

In May 1953, Agnes asked Bragg to visit Birkhead; she told Bragg that Birkhead would probably lie and say all was fine, that the FOD was going to reopen or that its files were soon going to be utilized by another group, but she said they had already been transferred to the American Jewish Committee. Most of the FOD's files were not transferred and instead were lost. She asked for a frank assessment of his physical and mental state, unsure if he could be helped. Agnes wondered what happened to his 4,000 book library, and his daughter-in-law later wondered if person or persons had taken advantage of him, which she thought could explain why he was destitute in his final years. In August 1954, Birkhead wrote in his column that he been regularly going to a hospital specializing in cancer treatment. In his last column, written a few days before his death, Birkhead criticized the formation of an anti-communist Jewish group, saying it was too sectarian and the effort would be better spent by having Jews join a wider anti-communist group. Birkhead died alone on December 1, 1954, at the age of 69, in a Manhattan hotel he had resided in for about two years. A medical examiner said his death was from natural causes. Agnes believed he died of malnutrition and had received no medical attention in his last weeks. Potter organized a funeral attended by 30 to 40 people, including Agnes, Kenneth, and some Unitarian ministers and humanists. A memorial service was held at All Souls a few days later. The day after his death, his last foe, McCarthy, was censured by the U.S. Senate.

== Legacy ==
Birkhead is largely forgotten. After his death, Agnes said she had to return to work to repay his debts. She died in 1988, aged 102. After leaving the FOD, Kenneth worked as an aide for prominent members of the Democratic Party and in senior roles for left-wing groups. He died in 1979, aged 65. Former U.S. senator Thomas J. McIntyre learned of the activity of Birkhead and allies from Kenneth, his one-time aide, and incorporated it into his attacks on what he termed the "new native fascism", the New Christian Right.

Birkhead's papers were donated to the State Historical Society of Missouri in 1993 and are collected at its Kansas City location. They include little correspondence or material written by Birkhead himself. A biography of Birkhead written by Jim Grebe, a congregant at All Souls, was self-published in 2013.

== Works ==
- The Scopes Trial and the Larger Issues Involved (1925). All Souls Unitarian Church.
- "The Writing of 'Elmer Gantry'", "Sinclair Lewis' 'Elmer Gantry' and What Is Wrong With the Preachers", and "Aimee Semple McPherson's Alton, Illinois, Revivalistic Orgy" Is "Elmer Gantry" True? (c. 1928). Little Blue Book 1265. (Note: Published under Birkhead's name with multiple other essays by other authors.)
- The Common Sense of Health: An Interview With Dr. Logan Clendening, Author of "The Human Body" (c. 1929). Little Blue Book 1333.
- The Sins of Good People (c. 1929). Little Blue Book 1371.
- Religious Bunk Over the Radio (c. 1929). Little Blue Book 1407.
- Can Man Know God? A preacher removes his theological spectacles and gives a forthright answer (c. 1929). Little Blue Book 1440.
- Can People Be Made Good by Law? (c. 1929). Little Blue Book 1447.
- President Hoover and Quakerism (c. 1929). Little Blue Book 1451.
- The Religion of a Free Man (c. 1929). Little Blue Book 1485.
- Missouri University Sex Questionnaire and Its Significance (c. 1929). Little Blue Book 1498.
- "Can We Follow Jesus Today? No!" Can We Follow Jesus Today: A Debate (c. 1929). Little Blue Book 1531. (Note: Published with "Can We Follow Jesus Today? Yes!" by Joseph Myers and commentary by Emanuel Haldeman-Julius.)
- The Essence of Unitarianism (c. 1930). Little Blue Book 1537.
- "Meddlers and Uplifters: Are They a Menace to Civilization?" A Liberal View of Divorce (c. 1931). Little Blue Book 1582. (Note: Published with multiple other essays by other authors.)
- "Religion Takes to the Highways" and "How to Avoid Bunk" The Crisis that Threatens the Church (c. 1931). Little Blue Book 1584.
- From Sin to Psychiatry: An Interview on the Way to Mental Health with Dr. Karl A. Menninger (c. 1931). Little Blue Book 1585.

== Bibliography ==
- Blake, John Tyler (1998). Sinclair Lewis's Kansas City Laboratory: The Genesis of Elmer Gantry (PhD thesis). University of Missouri–Kansas City.
- Grebe, Jim (2013). Democracy's Defender: The Life of L. M. Birkhead. Internet Archive. Lulu Press, Inc. ISBN 978-1-4834-0146-1.
- Howell, Thomas (July 2016). "Kansas City's Crusader: Leon Birkhead and the Fight against Fascism". Missouri Historical Review. 110 (4): 237–259 – via The State Historical Society of Missouri.
- Hutchisson, James M. (March 2003). The Rise of Sinclair Lewis, 1920–1930. Internet Archive. Pennsylvania State University Press. ISBN 978-0-271-02123-2.
- Koblas, John J. (1981). Sinclair Lewis: Home at Last. Internet Archive. Bloomington, Minnesota: Voyageur Press. ISBN 978-0-89658-024-4.
- Lingeman, Richard R. (2002). Sinclair Lewis: Rebel from Main Street. Internet Archive. Random House. ISBN 978-0-679-43823-6.
- Relyea, Harold C. (December 1971). Anti-Extremism and Ideology: A Study of Membership Attitudes and Characteristics of the Institute of American Democracy, a Non-Partisan, Non-Sectarian, Anti-Extremist Organization (PhD thesis). American University. pp. 166–182.
- Ribuffo, Leo P. (1983). The Old Christian Right: The Protestant Far Right from the Great Depression to the Cold War. Internet Archive. Philadelphia: Temple University Press. ISBN 978-0-87722-297-2.
- Schorer, Mark (1961). Sinclair Lewis, an American Life. Internet Archive. New York: McGraw-Hill.
