= First Unitarian Society of Minneapolis =

Non-theistic community in Minneapolis

First Unitarian Society of Minneapolis is a non-theistic humanist community and member of the Unitarian-Universalist Association located at 900 Mount Curve, Minneapolis, Minnesota. Once led by the influential minister John H. Dietrich who is known as the "Father of Religious Humanism," First Unitarian Society of Minneapolis is considered in today's terminology the "birthplace of Congregational Humanism."

== History ==
In the 1870s, the Minneapolis chapter of the National Liberal League began meeting to discuss the ideas of geologist Charles Lyell and naturalist Charles Darwin. Upon hearing visiting Unitarian minister Henry Martyn Simmons (1841-1905) lecture, eighteen members of the Liberal League voted to incorporate as a Unitarian congregation on November 18, 1881 so that Simmons would join them in Minneapolis.

The articles of incorporation defined the Society's purpose as to form an association where "people without regard to theological differences may unite for mutual helpfulness in intellectual, moral, and religious culture, and humane work."

The sermons of Rev. Simmons on evolution, science, and ethics drew large crowds. Simmons was a vocal opponent of the U.S. invasion of the Philippines and the congregation was instrumental in convincing the state of Minnesota to withdraw its troops from the war.

The Society's first building, designed by noted architect Leroy Buffington, was dedicated in June 1887.

The Society has always attracted progressive social activists. Congregants set up literacy programs for working children and made clothes for the needy. The Women's Alliance of the congregation funded a free delivery room for unwed mothers at the Maternity Hospital of physician and social reformer Martha Ripley.

Two congregants, Maud Conkey Stockwell and Clara Ueland, served as president of the Minnesota Woman Suffrage Association from 1901-1919. After voting rights had been achieved, the organization became the Minnesota League of Women Voters, with Clara Ueland as its first president.

Beginning in 1906, the congregation sponsored the Saturday Lunch Club, often called the "university for progressive ideas." Lecturers included Clarence Darrow, John Haynes Holmes, Minnesota Governor Floyd B. Olson, and Louis Brandeis.

In 1916, the Society called John H. Dietrich as its minister. Dietrich is considered the father of "Religious Humanism," a secularization of the Sunday morning liturgical experience.

Dietrich's talks proved so popular that services were moved to the Garrick Theater in downtown Minneapolis and later to another large downtown theater, the Shubert, to accommodate the audiences that regularly exceeded 1,000. Dietrich's talks were broadcast on radio and published as pamphlets.

In 1917, Dietrich met Curtis W. Reese, another midwestern Unitarian minister who was advancing similar humanistic ideals. They formed the core of a growing number of Humanist ministers among Unitarian clergy. This movement led to the publication of A Humanist Manifesto in 1933. One of the principal authors of Manifesto I was Rev. Raymond Bragg, who would succeed John Dietrich as minister of the Society.

The Society outgrew its Harmon Place building and built the Unitarian Center at 1526 Harmon Place in 1926. Sunday assemblies were still held in downtown theaters.

In 1929, the Society's Women's Alliance formed the American Birth Control League after sponsoring a lecture by Margaret Sanger. In 1930, the League opened the first birth control clinic in the state, which later became Planned Parenthood of Minnesota, North Dakota, and South Dakota.

During the Great Depression the Society was instrumental in forming the Humanist Credit Union, which later became part of the Group Health Plan, Inc. and eventually Group Health in 1957 before becoming HealthPartners, Inc., today the nation's largest health co-op.

The Society hosted the Minneapolis Theatre Union which, in collaboration with the Society's own acting group, the Assembly Players, produced plays concerning union organizing and liberal causes of the day. For example, the group raised money for the Scottsboro Defense Fund.

In the 1940s, when cremation was not easily available, members formed the Minnesota chapter of Funeral Consumers Alliance.

In 1951, the Society moved into its present building at 900 Mount Curve Avenue in urban Minneapolis. Designed by the architectural firm of Thorshov and Cerny, the building reflects the humanist values of the congregation in its minimalist design and absence of religious symbols.

The progressive activism of the Society continued.

From 1966 through 1978, the Society's minister, Robert Lehman, offered draft counseling and facilitated support groups for gay men. Public assembly of gay people was illegal in the state at the time.

Minister Khoren Arisian participated in the formation of the North American Committee for Humanism and the establishment of the Humanist Institute, a national training center for humanist leadership. Rev. Arisian was a signer of Humanist Manifesto II.

Today, First Unitarian Society remains a humanist congregation and is a focal point for humanist, freethought, and atheist groups in the Twin Cities. Senior minister Rev. Dr. David Breeden led the society down a new course of humanism, which he rebranded from Religious Humanism to Congregational Humanism in order to help clarify its non-theistic nature for the contemporary world. Breeden was committed to the work of "decolonizing Humanism." He is a published poet and author of several works, works with several institutions providing advanced education to the next generation of Humanist leaders, and serves as chair of the Education Committee at the American Humanist Association.

== Settled ministers ==
- Henry Martyn Simmons, 1881-1905
- E. Stanton Hodgin, 1905-1909
- Wilson Backus, 1910-1916
- John H. Dietrich, 1916-1938
- Raymond Bragg, 1938-1947
- Carl Storm, 1947-1965
- Robert Lehman, 1965-1978
- Khoren Arisian, 1979-1997
- Anne Heller, 1990-1994
- Kendyl Gibbons, 1998-2012
- David Breeden, 2013-2024
- Chad Snyder, 2026-
