= Edwin Arthur Burtt =

American philosopher

- Born: October 11, 1892; Groton, Massachusetts
- Died: September 6, 1989 (aged 96); Ithaca, New York

Education
- Education: Yale University
- Doctoral advisor: Frederick J. E. Woodbridge

Philosophical work
- Era: 20th-century philosophy
- Region: Western philosophy
- School: Pragmatism; Pragmatic naturalism ("Young Radicals")
- Institutions: Columbia University, University of Chicago, Cornell University, Harvard University, Stanford University, University of Hawaiʻi
- Main interests: Philosophy of science, history of science, philosophy of religion
- Notable ideas: Metaphysical foundations of physical science

Edwin Arthur Burtt (October 11, 1892 – September 6, 1989), usually cited as E. A. Burtt, was an American philosopher who wrote extensively on the philosophy of religion. His doctoral thesis published as a book under the title The Metaphysical Foundations of Modern Physical Science has had a significant influence upon the history of science that is not generally recognized, according to H. Floris Cohen.

== Biography ==
He was born on October 11, 1892, in Groton, Massachusetts. His missionary parents took Burtt to China for several of his teenage years. He was educated at Yale University. He graduated from Yale in 1915, where he was a member of Skull and Bones. He attended Union Theological Seminary and Columbia University. He became the Susan Linn Sage Professor of Philosophy at Cornell University in 1941.

He died on September 6, 1989, in Ithaca, New York.

== Work ==
Though he maintained throughout his life a sympathy towards religious values and beliefs, he acknowledged that his philosophy had been marked by a reaction towards what he saw as his own father's too narrow outlook. Although Burtt participated in drafting the Humanist Manifesto I, he did not work on the project further, because he lost interest after his ideas that spiritual experience is the identification with categories of space, time, causality, and other fundamental physical principles were never included in the final publications. However, in 1973 he was one of the signers of the Humanist Manifesto II.

== Legacy ==
Based on his own statements, Thomas Kuhn may very well have been unaware that in building on the philosophy of Alexandre Koyré, he was in turn building on the philosophy of Burtt whose influence upon Koyré has been demonstrated as substantial.

== Publications ==
- The Metaphysical Foundations of Modern Physical Science. A Historical and Critical Essay (London: Kegan Paul, Trench, Trübner; 1924, 1925)
- The Metaphysics of Sir Isaac Newton (1925)
- Principles and Problems of Right Thinking (1928)
- Religion in an Age of Science (1930)
- The English Philosophers, from Bacon to Mill (1939)
- Types of Religious Philosophy (1939)
- The Teachings of the Compassionate Buddha (1955)
- Man Seeks the Divine: A Study in the History and Comparison of Religions (1957)
- In Search of Philosophic Understanding (1965)
- Light, Love and Life (1986)

== See also ==
- List of science and religion scholars
- American philosophy
- List of American philosophers

== Sources ==
- Diane Davis Villemaire, E.A. Burtt, Historian and Philosopher: A Study of the author of The Metaphysical Foundations of Modern Physical Science (Boston Studies in the Philosophy of Science), Kluwer Academic Publishers, 2002, ISBN 1-4020-0428-1.
