= Humanist Manifesto =

Humanist worldview

Humanist Manifesto is the title of three manifestos laying out a humanist worldview. They are the original A Humanist Manifesto (1933, often referred to as Humanist Manifesto I), the Humanist Manifesto II (1973), and Humanism and Its Aspirations: Humanist Manifesto III (2003). The original manifesto originally arose from religious humanism, though secular humanists also signed.

The central theme of all three manifestos is the elaboration of a philosophy and value system which does not necessarily include belief in any personal deity or "higher power", although the three differ considerably in their tone, form, and ambition. Each has been signed at its launch by various prominent members of academia and others who are in general agreement with its principles.

== A Humanist Manifesto (I) ==
A Humanist Manifesto was written in 1933 primarily by Roy Wood Sellars and Raymond Bragg and was published with 34 signatories, including philosopher John Dewey. Unlike later revisions, the first manifesto talked of a new "religion", and referred to humanism as a religious movement to transcend and replace previous religions that were based on supernatural revelation. The document outlines a 15-point belief system, which, in addition to a secular outlook, opposes "acquisitive and profit-motivated society" and outlines a worldwide egalitarian society based on voluntary mutual cooperation, language which was considerably softened by the humanists' board, owners of the document, twenty years later.

The title "A Humanist Manifesto"—rather than "The Humanist Manifesto"—was intentional, predictive of later manifestos to follow, as indeed has been the case. Unlike the creeds of major organized religions, the setting out of humanist ideals in these manifestos is an ongoing process. Indeed, in some communities of humanists, the compilation of personal manifestos is actively encouraged, and throughout the humanist movement, it is accepted that the humanist manifestos are not permanent or authoritative dogmas but are to be subject to ongoing critique.

== Humanist Manifesto II ==
The second manifesto was written in 1973 by Paul Kurtz and Edwin H. Wilson, and was intended to update and replace the previous one. It begins with a statement that the excesses of Nazism and World War II had made the first seem "far too optimistic", and indicated a more hardheaded and realistic approach in its 17-point statement, which was much longer and more elaborate than the previous version. Nevertheless, much of the unbridled optimism of the first remained, with hopes stated that war would become obsolete and poverty would be eliminated.

Many of the proposals in the document, such as opposition to racism and weapons of mass destruction and support of strong human rights, are fairly uncontroversial, and its prescriptions that divorce and birth control should be legal and that technology can improve life are widely accepted today in much of the Western world. However, in addition to its rejection of supernaturalism, various controversial stances are strongly supported, notably the right to abortion.

Initially published with a small number of signatures, the document was circulated and gained thousands more, and indeed, the American Humanist Association website encourages visitors to add their own names. A provision at the end noted that signators do "not necessarily endors[e] every detail" of the document.

Among the oft-quoted lines from this 1973 manifesto are: "No deity will save us; we must save ourselves", and "We are responsible for what we are and for what we will be", both of which may present difficulties for members of certain Christian, Jewish, and Muslim sects, or other believers in doctrines of submission to the will of an all-powerful God.

== Humanism and Its Aspirations: Humanist Manifesto III ==
With a full title of Humanism and Its Aspirations: Humanist Manifesto III, a Successor to the Humanist Manifesto of 1933, this work was published in 2003 by the American Humanist Association, and was written by the committee. Signatories included 22 Nobel laureates. The new document is a successor to the previous ones.

The newest manifesto is deliberately much shorter, listing six primary themes, which echo those of its predecessors:

- Knowledge of the world is derived by observation, experimentation, and rational analysis.
- Humans are an integral part of nature, the result of evolutionary change, an unguided process.
- Ethical values are derived from human need and interest as tested by experience.
- Life's fulfillment emerges from individual participation in the service of humane ideals.
- Humans are social by nature and find meaning in relationships.
- Working to benefit society maximizes individual happiness.

=== A Secular Humanist Declaration ===
The Council for Secular Humanism, founded by Paul Kurtz, published its A Secular Humanist Declaration in 1980, addressing the following themes:

1. Free inquiry
2. Separation of church and state
3. The ideal of freedom
4. Ethics based on critical intelligence
5. Moral education
6. Religious skepticism
7. Reason
8. Science and technology
9. Evolution
10. Education

A Secular Humanist Declaration was an argument for and statement of support for democratic secular humanism. The document was issued by the Council for Democratic and Secular Humanism (CODESH), later renamed the Council for Secular Humanism (CSH). Compiled by Paul Kurtz, it is largely a restatement of the content of the American Humanist Association's 1973 Humanist Manifesto II, of which Kurtz was co-author with Edwin H. Wilson. Both had served as editors of The Humanist, from which Kurtz departed in 1979 and thereafter set about establishing his own movement and his own periodical. His A Secular Humanist Declaration was the starting point for these enterprises.

=== Humanist Manifesto 2000 ===
Humanist Manifesto 2000: A Call for New Planetary Humanism is a book by Paul Kurtz published in 2000. It differs from the above works in that it is a full-length book rather than essay-length. It was published not by the American Humanist Association but by the Council for Secular Humanism. In it, Kurtz argues for many of the points already formulated in Humanist Manifesto II, of which he had been a co-author in 1973.

=== Amsterdam Declaration 2002 ===
The Amsterdam Declaration 2002 is a statement of the fundamental principles of modern humanism passed unanimously by the General Assembly of the International Humanist and Ethical Union (IHEU) at the 50th anniversary World Humanist Congress in 2002. According to the IHEU, the declaration "is the official statement of World Humanism".

It is officially supported by all member organizations of the IHEU including:

- American Humanist Association
- British Humanist Association
- Humanist Canada
- Council of Australian Humanist Societies
- Council for Secular Humanism
- Gay and Lesbian Humanist Association
- Human-Etisk Forbund, the Norwegian humanist association
- Humanist Association of Ireland
- Indian Humanist Union
- Philippine Atheists and Agnostics Society

This declaration makes exclusive use of capitalized Humanist and Humanism, which is consistent with IHEU's general practice and recommendations for promoting a unified humanist identity. To further promote humanist identity, these words are also free of any adjectives, as recommended by prominent members of IHEU. Such usage is not universal among IHEU member organizations, though most of them do observe these conventions.

== See also ==
- Amsterdam Declaration 2002, a similar document from the International Humanist and Ethical Union
- Criticism of religion
  - Anti-clericalism
  - Separation of church and state
- Ethical veganism
- Evolution in public education
- Irreligion by country
- Jewish secularism
- Marxist humanism
- Secular Buddhism
- Secular morality
- Social philosophy
- The Necessity of Atheism, a 1811 essay written by the English poet Percy Bysshe Shelley
- The Necessity of Secularism, a 2014 essay written by the Center for Inquiry president Ronald A. Lindsay
- Universal Declaration of Human Rights, a similar document adopted in 1948 by the U.N. General Assembly
- Vegetarianism and religion
