= Clinton Lee Scott =

American Universalist minister

Clinton Lee Scott (September 28, 1887 – September 28, 1985) was an American Universalist minister and outspoken pacifist.

From 1914 to 1946, he served Universalist churches in Northfield, Vermont; Buffalo, New York; Philadelphia, Pennsylvania; Los Angeles, California; Atlanta, Georgia; Peoria, Illinois; Dayton, Ohio; El Dorado, Ohio; and Gloucester, Massachusetts. He was a State Convention Superintendent in Massachusetts and Connecticut, returning to parish work in 1956, serving in Tarpon Springs, Florida, until retiring at age 84.

His 1946 book, Parish Parables is still available as an ebook. His theology evolved from liberal Christian, to Christian humanist, to global humanist. As the first prominent Universalist to embrace humanism, he signed the Humanist Manifesto I in 1933 and Humanist Manifesto II in 1973.
