= Maynard Shipley =

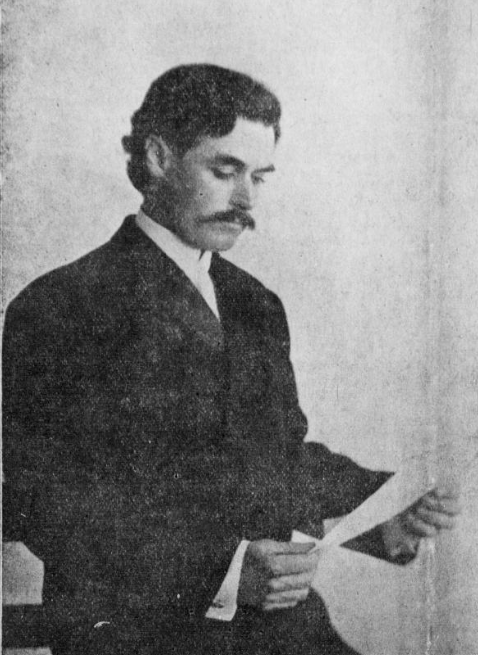
- Born: December 1, 1872; Baltimore, Maryland
- Died: June 18, 1934 (aged 61); Sausalito, California
- Occupation: Science writer

Maynard Shipley (December 1, 1872 – June 18, 1934) was an American freethinker and science writer.

== Biography ==
Shipley was born in Baltimore and was educated at Stanford University, California. He lectured on science and founded the Academy of Science in Seattle, 1898.

He defended evolution and campaigned against creationism and religious fundamentalism. He founded the Science League of America in 1924 of which he was President. The League was known for its advocacy of separation of church and state and protecting the freedom of science education.

Shipley was married to Miriam Allen deFord. He was an active member of the Socialist Party of America and ran for Congress on its ticket in 1920, but resigned from the party in 1922. A member of the Rationalist Press Association, he contributed articles to the Truth Seeker and wrote 33 titles for the Little Blue Books series. He was an atheist.

Shipley was a signer of Humanist Manifesto I. He died at his home in Sausalito, California.

== Selected publications ==
- Hypnotism Made Plain (1924)
- Principles of Electricity (1924)
- The Intelligence of Vertebrate Animals (1924)
- Sources of Bible Myths and Legends (1925)
- Sex and the Garden of Eden Myth: A Collection of Essays on Christianity (1927)
- The War on Modern Science: A Short History of the Fundamentalist Attacks on Evolution and Modernism (1927)
- The Real Aims of Catholicism (1928)
- The Key to Evolution (1930)

== Electoral record ==
United States House of Representatives elections, 1920
Party	Candidate	Votes	%
Republican	John A. Elston (incumbent)	75,610	83.3
Socialist	Maynard Shipley	15,151	16.7
Total votes		90,761	100.0
Republican hold			
