= Roy Wood Sellars =

American philosopher (1880–1973)

Roy Wood Sellars (/ˈsɛlərz/; July 9, 1880, Seaforth, Ontario – September 5, 1973, Ann Arbor, Michigan) was a Canadian-born American philosopher of critical perceptual realism and religious humanism, and a proponent of naturalistic emergent evolution (which he called "evolutionary naturalism"). He was the father of Wilfrid Sellars.

Sellars received his B.A. (1903) and Ph.D. (1908/09) from the University of Michigan, where he taught philosophy for over 40 years. He also briefly studied at the Hartford Theological Seminary, the University of Paris (under Henri Bergson), and the University of Heidelberg (under Hans Driesch and Wilhelm Windelband). He made contributions to metaphysics, epistemology, ethics, philosophy of science, and political philosophy.

In his 1969 book Reflections on American Philosophy from Within he described his views on materialism as evolutionary materialism, an extension to his 1922 book Evolutionary Naturalism.

He helped draft the Humanist Manifesto in 1933 and also signed the Humanist Manifesto II in 1973. Sellars was a supporter of socialism, saying that socialism was a democratic conception of economic organisation which "will give the maximum possible at any one time of justice and liberty".

== See also ==
- American philosophy
- New realism (Sellars's thought was developed against American new realism)
