= V. T. Thayer =

American educator (1886–1979)

Vivian Trow Thayer (1886–1979) is best known as a Progressive educator who authored many books about American education. He was married to Florence Amelia Adams.

Thayer was born in Nebraska and raised in rural Wisconsin. Thayer's father worked as a minister, rural mail-carrier, and farmer. The economic challenges of Thayer's early life impacted his sensitivity to the struggle of others later in his career. He attended Carroll Academy, and then moved to the University of Wisconsin at Madison, where he received his B.A., M.A., and Ph.D. in philosophy. While pursuing his degrees, Thayer worked to support himself through employment first as an attendant at a sanitarium, then in a restaurant, and later waiting tables in a boarding house. At one point, financial constraints forced him to take a two-year leave from the university and serve first as principal of an elementary school, and later as Superintendent of Schools, in Ashland, Wisconsin.

During his tenure as Educational Director of the Ethical Culture Schools in New York City from 1928–1948, Thayer was involved with the Progressive Education Association. His role and work in the Eight-Year Study led to the formation of a second commission which he chaired: the Commission on the Secondary School Curriculum. The results of the commission were published in Reorganizing Secondary Education (1939).

Thayer is associated with the educational philosophy of John Dewey, and worked with many leading Progressive educators. Among others were Boyd H. Bode, Horace Kallen, and Harold Alberty. Thayer lectured and taught at many universities, including Teacher's College, Columbia University; Harvard University; Ohio State University; the University of Hawaii; the University of Virginia; and Johns Hopkins University.

In 1933, Thayer was one of the original signories of the Humanist Manifesto (I). He served in editorial positions for the American Review and the Journal of Educational Research. Thayer was named a Kappa Delta Pi Laureate, Pioneer Humanist of the Year (1964) by the American Humanist Association, and in 1969 received the Distinguished Lifetime Service to Education award from The John Dewey Society.

== Works ==
Thayer's many books include the following:

- The Passing of the Recitation, Boston: D. C. Heath, (1928)
- American Education Under Fire, New York: Harper (1944)
- Religion in Public Education, New York: Viking (1945)
- The Attack Upon the American Secular School, Boston: Beacon Press, (1951)
- Public Education and Its Critics, New York: Macmillan, (1954)
- The Challenge of the Present to Public Education, Columbus: Ohio State University Press, (1958)
- Formative Ideas in American Education: From the Colonial Period to the Present, New York: Dodd Meade (1965)
