= John H. Dietrich =

John Hassler Dietrich (January 14, 1878–1957) was a Unitarian minister, born at Chambersburg, Pennsylvania, is called the "Father of Religious Humanism". He was educated at Franklin and Marshall College and at the Lancaster Theological Seminary in Lancaster, Pennsylvania, ordained in the ministry of the Reformed Church in 1905, and defrocked in 1911 for failing to affirm primary Christian beliefs. His religious development evolved to Humanism and Unitarianism, in which he served various pastorates, including First Unitarian Society of Spokane (1911–1916), and then First Unitarian Society of Minneapolis (1916–1938). He retired to Berkeley, California, where he died. He is buried in the crypt of First Unitarian Church of Chicago. He was the author of:

- The Gain for Religion in Modern Thought (1908)
- The Religion of a Sceptic (1911)
- Substitutes for the Old Beliefs (1914)
- From Stardust to Soul (1916)
- The Religion of Evolution (1917)
- The Religion of Humanity (1919)
- The Fathers of Evolution (1927)

== See also ==
- Religious humanism
- Humanist Manifesto I
- Unitarian Universalism
