= Edwin H. Wilson =

American humanist (1898–1993)

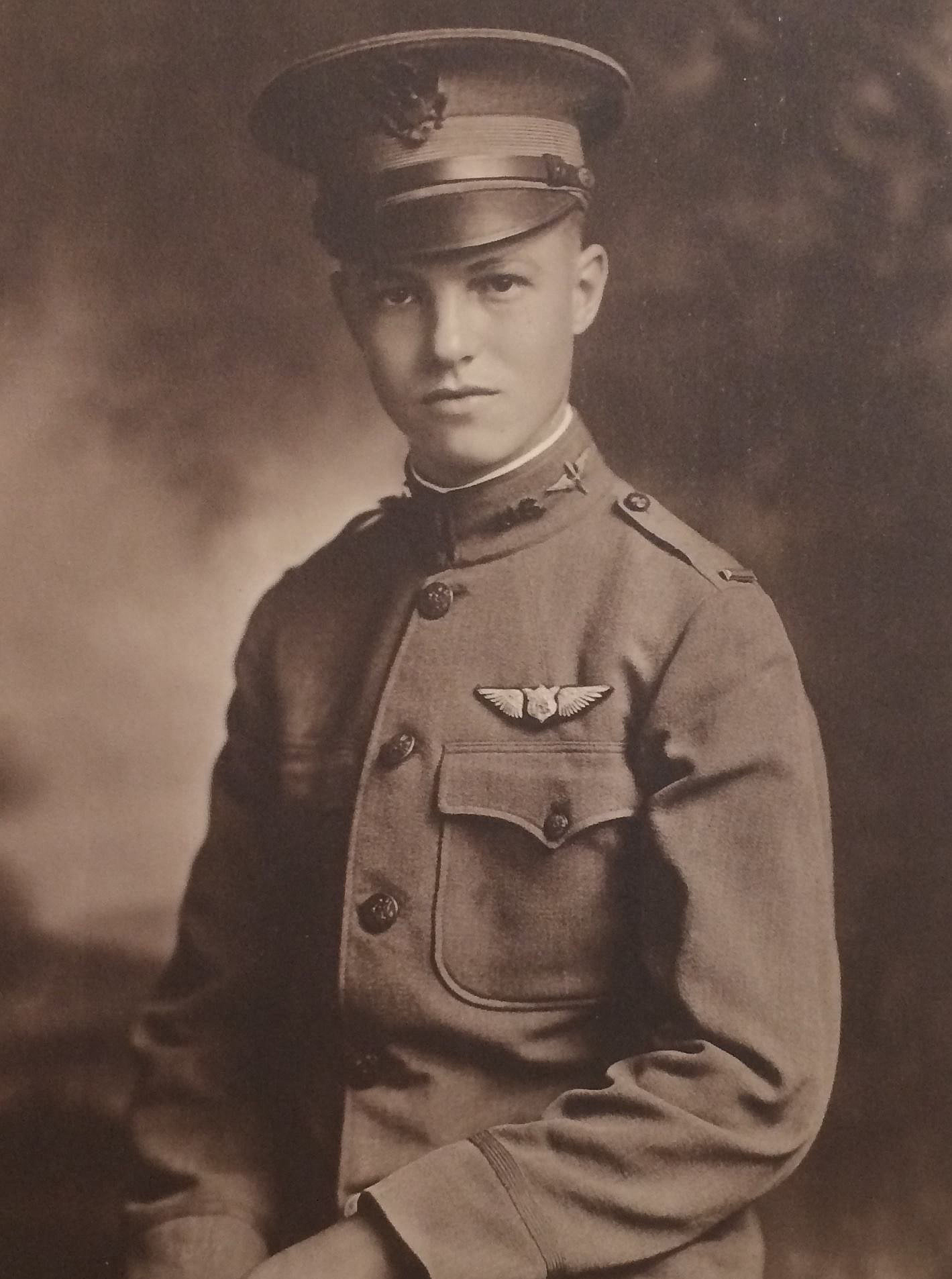
WWI pilot portrait

Edwin Henry Wilson (August 23, 1898 – March 26, 1993) was an American Unitarian leader and humanist who helped draft the Humanist Manifesto.

Wilson was born on August 23, 1898, in Woodhaven, New York. He was raised in Concord, Massachusetts and graduated from the Meadville Theological School in 1926. In 1928 he was ordained and became a practicing Unitarian minister in Dayton, Ohio. One of the activities during his four-year tenure at the First Unitarian Church of Dayton was to publish the national Unitarian newsletter "Dawn." At his next church, the Third Unitarian Church of Chicago, he continued to publish this newsletter until 1941. He later served churches in Schenectady, New York; Yellow Springs, Ohio; Salt Lake City, Utah; and Cocoa Beach, Florida. During the 1980s he returned to Dayton to serve as the First Unitarian Church's Minister Emeritus until 1988.

By 1930 Wilson was the managing editor of The New Humanist, which published the first Humanist Manifesto in 1933. In 1941 he became the first editor of the Humanist magazine and one of the founders of the American Humanist Association.

Wilson was one of the primary authors of both the Humanist Manifesto I of 1933 and Humanist Manifesto II of 1973. In 1952, he participated as a founding director in the foundation of the International Humanist and Ethical Union.

He was named the 1979 Humanist of the Year by the American Humanist Association.

His book, The Genesis of the Humanist Manifesto, was published after his death, edited by Teresa Maciocha.
