= Humanist Manifesto II =

1973 manifesto

Humanist Manifesto II, written in 1973 by humanists Paul Kurtz and Edwin H. Wilson, was an update to the previous Humanist Manifesto published in 1933, and the second entry in the Humanist Manifesto series. It begins with a statement that the excesses of National Socialism and world war had made the first Manifesto seem too optimistic, and indicated a more hardheaded and realistic approach in its seventeen-point statement, which was much longer and more elaborate than the previous version. Nevertheless, much of the optimism of the first remained in its expressed hope that war and poverty would be eliminated.

In addition to its absolute rejection of theism, deism, and belief in credible proof of any afterlife, various political stances were supported, such as opposition to racism and weapons of mass destruction; support of human rights; a proposition of an international court; and the rights to unrestricted contraception, abortion, antibiotics, divorce, and death with dignity (e.g., euthanasia and suicide).

Initially published with a small number of signatures, the document was circulated and gained thousands more; the American Humanist Association's website encourages visitors to add their own name. A provision at the end of the Manifesto—stating that the signators do "not necessarily endorse every detail" of the document, but only its broad vision—likely helped many overcome reservations about attaching their name.

One of the oft-quoted lines that comes from the Manifesto is, "No deity will save us; we must save ourselves."

The Humanist Manifesto II first appeared in The Humanist's September/October 1973 edition, when Paul Kurtz and Edwin H. Wilson were editor and editor emeritus, respectively.

== Signatories ==
The 120 original signatories to the manifesto included the following:

=== United Kingdom ===
- A. J. Ayer
- H. J. Blackham
- Hermann Bondi
- Brigid Brophy
- Francis Crick
- H. J. Eysenck
- Raymond Firth
- Antony Flew
- James Hemming
- Julian Huxley
- Margaret Knight
- Ritchie Calder

=== United States ===
- Isaac Asimov
- Paul Blanshard
- Joseph Leon Blau
- Arthur Danto
- Paul Edwards
- Alexander Esenin-Volpin
- Betty Friedan
- James Farmer
- Joseph Fletcher
- Mordecai Kaplan
- Alan F. Guttmacher
- Maxine Greene
- Sidney Hook
- Irving Horowitz
- Corliss Lamont
- Vashti McCollum
- Herbert Muller
- Lester Mondale
- A. Philip Randolph
- B. F. Skinner
- Mark Starr
- Maurice Visscher
- Bertram Wolfe
- Joseph Margolis

=== Yugoslavia ===
- Svetozar Stojanovic

=== Soviet Union ===
- Andrei Sakharov

=== France ===
- Jean-Francois Revel

== See also ==
- Amsterdam Declaration 2002, a similar document from the International Humanist and Ethical Union
- Criticism of religion
  - Anti-clericalism
  - Separation of church and state
- Ethical veganism
- Evolution in public education
- Irreligion by country
- Jewish secularism
- Marxist humanism
- Secular Buddhism
- Secular morality
- Social philosophy
- The Necessity of Atheism, a 1811 essay written by the English poet Percy Bysshe Shelley
- The Necessity of Secularism, a 2014 essay written by the Center for Inquiry president Ronald A. Lindsay
- Universal Declaration of Human Rights, a similar document adopted in 1948 by the U.N. General Assembly
- Vegetarianism and religion
