= Raymond Bragg =

American Unitarian minister (1902–1979)

Raymond Bennett Bragg (1902–1979) was an American Unitarian minister who played a key role in the writing of the original Humanist Manifesto (1933) and eventually signing Humanist Manifesto II (1973). Raymond Bragg was born in Massachusetts and attended Bates College and Brown University. In 1927, he earned a B.A. in philosophy from the University of Chicago and a B.D. from Meadville Theological School and was ordained at the Unitarian Church of All Souls in Evanston, Illinois where he was pastor until 1930. From 1930–1935 he served as the Secretary of the Western Unitarian Conference. During these years he was also the editor of The New Humanist, and was one of the signers of the Humanist Manifesto, which helped give rise to a new humanist movement within Unitarianism. He served as pastor of the First Unitarian Society of Minneapolis from 1935–1947. He was the executive director of the Unitarian Service Committee from 1947–1952, and then became the pastor of All Souls Unitarian Church, Kansas City, Missouri, where he remained until his retirement in 1973. During this time, he chaired the Kansas City's Civil Liberties Union, worked on the local and state levels to improve mental health services, and was an assistant professor of philosophy at the Kansas City Art Institute. Upon his retirement, he was elected Minister Emeritus by the Kansas City congregation.
