= Work of Art (book) =

Novel by Sinclair Lewis

- Author: Sinclair Lewis
- Language: English
- Published: 1934
- Publisher: Doubleday
- Publication place: United States
- Pages: 452

Work of Art is a 1934 novel by Sinclair Lewis. The novel's protagonist is Myron Weagle, who aspires to climb the ladder of the American lodging industry and forms a "composite picture" of the hotel landscape of the early 20th-century. Upon its release, the New York Times called it "renewed evidence of [Lewis'] vitality", but also of his "essential shortcomings as a truly first-rate creative writer."
