= The Necessity of Secularism =

- The Necessity of Secularism: Why God Can't Tell Us What to Do
- Author: Ronald A. Lindsay
- Language: English
- Subject: Secularism
- Publisher: Pitchstone Publishing
- Publication date: 2014
- Media type: Paperback
- Pages: 224
- ISBN: 978-1939578129

The Necessity of Secularism: Why God Can't Tell Us What to Do is a book by Center for Inquiry CEO Ronald A. Lindsay arguing that secularism in government is the best solution to the problems posed by a society with differing and incompatible perspectives on religion, and that for democratic discourse to be successful, religious doctrines need to be kept out of public policy discussions.

== Overview ==
Lindsay's two primary themes in The Necessity of Secularism are the importance of secular government in a religiously pluralistic society and the independence of morality from theistic or religious belief. In support of the first theme, Lindsay argues that with different religious sects competing for membership and space in a democratic society, a common language is needed. In addition to formal separation of church and state, Lindsay urges that discussions of public policy be free from religious language and doctrine. Since religious language is only meaningful to practitioners of the religion that employs it, it's necessary to translate it to secular language in public policy discussions in a pluralistic society. Lindsay rejects arguments from authors such as Stephen Carter and Noah Feldman that such a requirement is too much of a burden to religious believers: "Most believers, like everyone else, live day-to-day in a secular world, a world in which we have no trouble communicating about natural phenomena...You don't need a Bible to conclude that if all humans are mortal, and Socrates is human, then Socrates is mortal. So secular language is spoken by believers already; they just have to apply it to public policy issues." In support of the second major theme of his book, the independence of morality from theistic or religious belief, Lindsay emphasizes the Euthyphro dilemma. He considers several religious responses to the dilemma, and concludes that none of them succeed. Further, Lindsay talks about the epistemological problems in claiming that a doctrine is based on divine revelation, as there is no independent way to verify that such a revelation has occurred. It is from this point that the reason in the eponymous sub-title of the book is given: "God cannot tell us what to do because, among other reasons, we are not able to recognize a command from God. Because God cannot effectively communicate with us, we cannot base morality on his commands."

== Reception ==
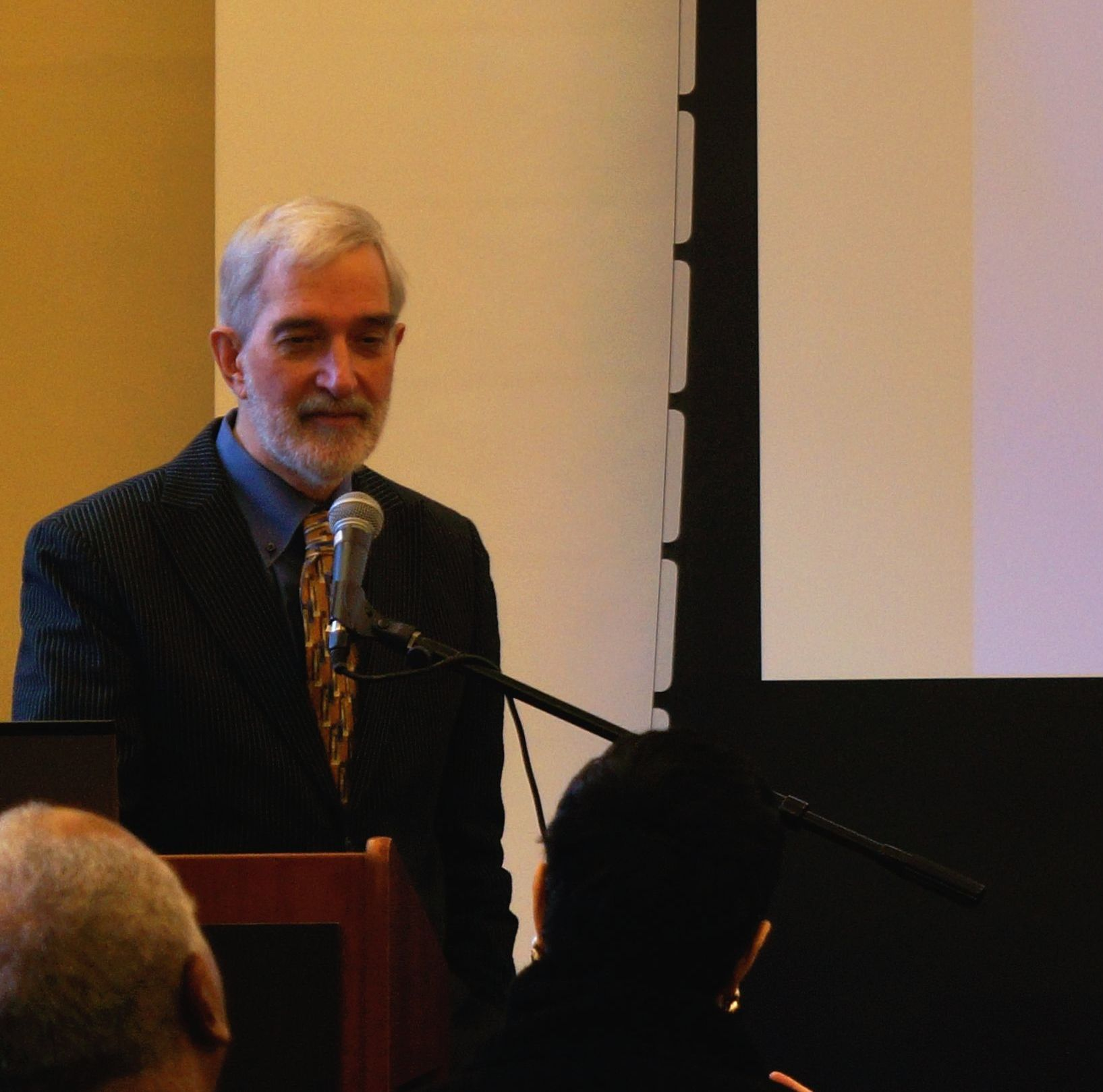
Lindsay giving a lecture on "The Necessity of Secularism" at CFI-DC.

Reviewing the book in Free Inquiry, Derek Araujo called it "a remarkably robust, compelling and concise defense of political secularism, peppered with engaging discussions on related topics in law, politics, and philosophy. Anyone interested in the interplay between faith, morality, and public policy would do well to read this book." Taking a more critical view, Angela Frost, in a review for the journal Arts and Humanities, noted Lindsay's contention that non-believers are seen as immoral: "[t]here are no statistical numbers to back this claim, however, weakening Lindsay's assertion." Frost concludes that "[w]hile Lindsey's premise is sound, he spends too much time condemning aspects of religion, perhaps at the risk of alienating those whom he hopes to sway. Targeted toward those interested in how religion and politics interact."

Lindsay has been active in promoting The Necessity of Secularism and its themes in public. He appeared on the December 8th, 2014 episode of Point of Inquiry to discuss the book and gave a lecture on its themes at Freethought Arizona. In addition, an excerpt was featured on Hemant Mehta's Friendly Atheist blog. In November 2016, Lindsay debated Elizabeth Bruenig, a liberal Christian writer and activist, at the Yale Political Union on the topic "Resolved: Religion Should Have No Place in Government," which touched on a key theme in his book.

Reviewing the book in Foreword magazine, Jason Henninger comments that the writing is clear and well-ordered, and respectful of people with differing views. In his opinion, Lindsay "offers clear and succinct counterarguments [to the claims that secular societies persecute religions, and are without morals], going so far as to say that morality and religion are in fact separate concerns and that secular societies protect religious practitioners, whereas theocratic societies persecute the unorthodox."

The evolutionary biologist Richard Dawkins quoted from the book on his website.

== See also ==
- Separation of Church and State
- Secular Morality
- Secular Ethics
