= Ronald A. Lindsay =

American academic

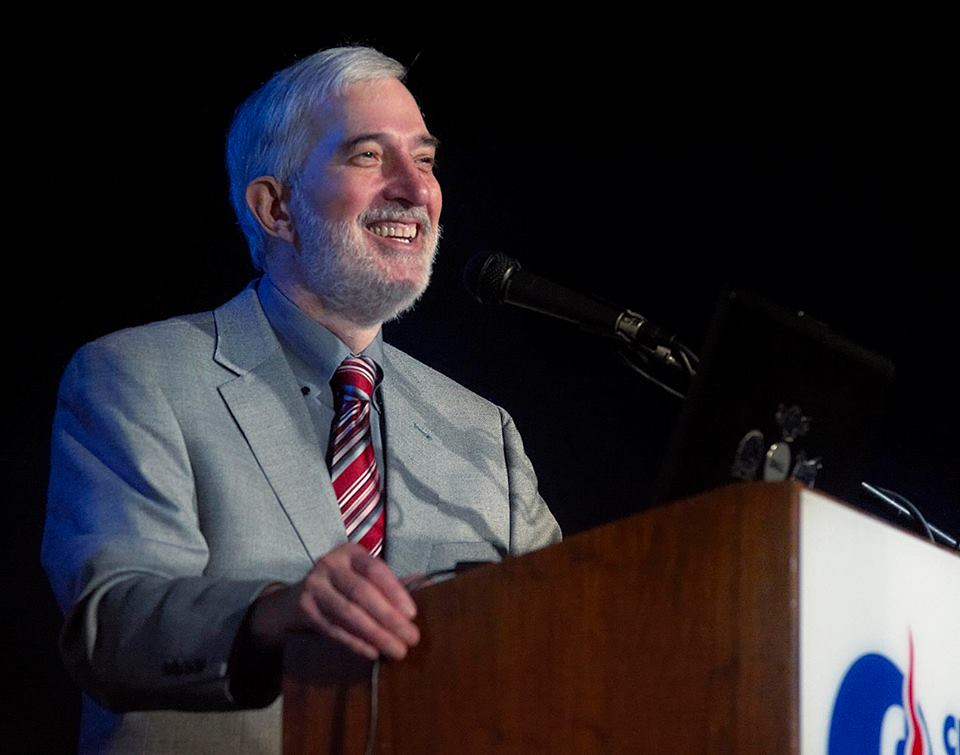
- Ron Lindsay giving a lecture on his book, "The Necessity of Secularism."
- Education: PhD Georgetown University, JD University of Virginia
- Ron Lindsay's voice recorded October 2016

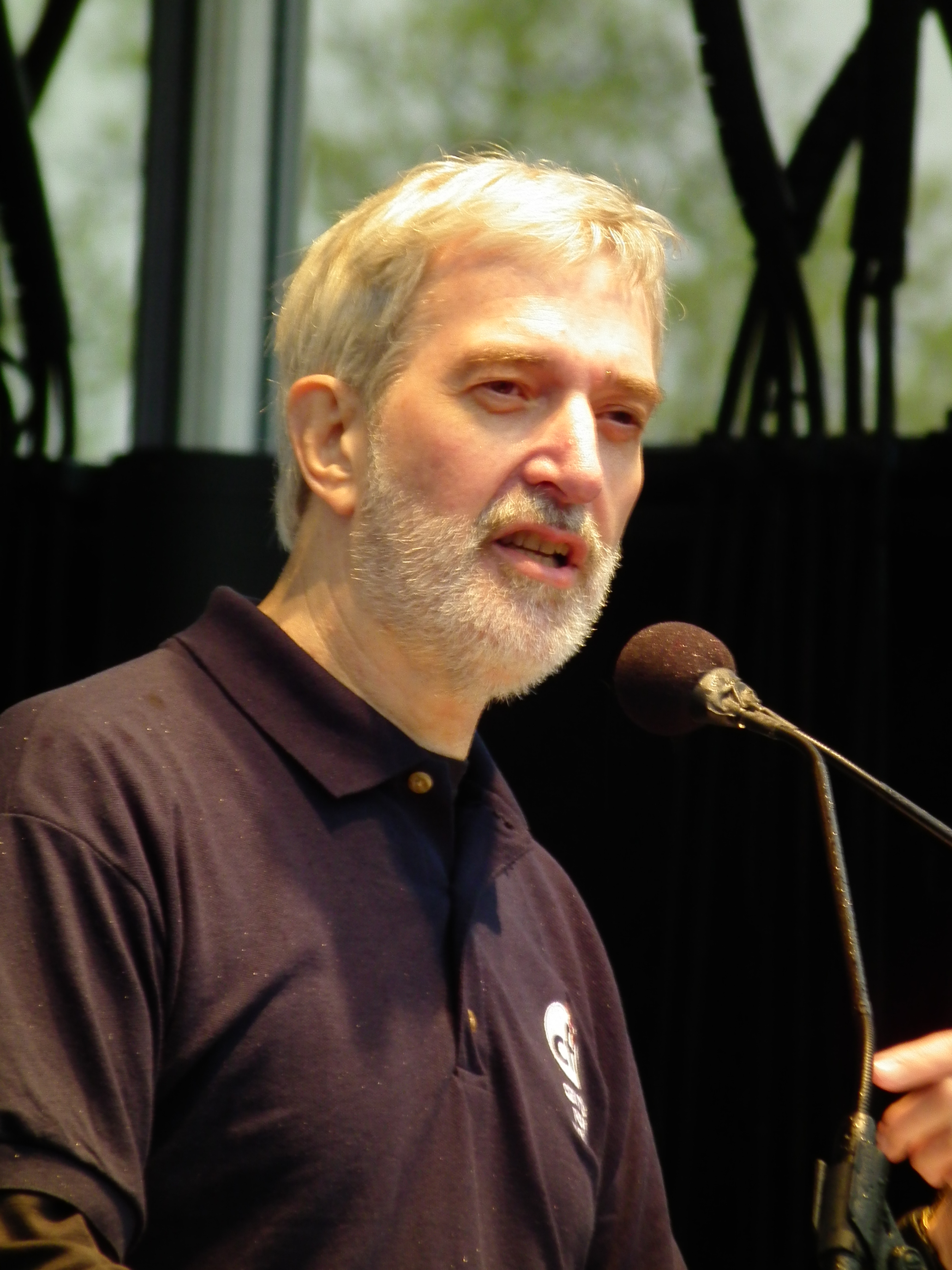
Ron Lindsay at Reason Rally in March 2012

Ronald A. Lindsay was president and CEO of the Center for Inquiry and of its affiliates, the Council for Secular Humanism and the Committee for Skeptical Inquiry. He held this position June 2008 – 2016.

== Philosophical work ==
Lindsay has a PhD in philosophy from Georgetown University, with a concentration in bioethics. He is the author of the book Future Bioethics: Overcoming, Taboos, Myths, and Dogmas (Prometheus: 2008). The book was favorably reviewed by the journal Nature, which described it as “reasoned, readable, and accessible.” In the book Lindsay argues for, among other things, legalization of assisted suicide and a removal of restrictions on embryonic stem cell research. He has published a number of articles in peer-reviewed journals, including the Kennedy Institute of Ethics Journal and the American Journal of Bioethics. These articles, like his book, focus on topics in bioethics, including the morality of assisted suicide and human enhancement technology. Lindsay also wrote the essay on Euthanasia for the International Encyclopedia of Ethics (Wiley-Blackwell: 2013).

Lindsay has also written several articles on ethical issues for Free Inquiry, the publication of the Council for Secular Humanism. These articles include a vigorous defense of equal rights for LGBT individuals, and a discussion of the foundation for a nonreligious ethics.

Lindsay's latest book is The Necessity of Secularism: Why God Can’t Tell Us What to Do (Pitchstone 2014). In this book, Lindsay argues that for democratic discourse to be successful, religious doctrines need to be kept out of public policy discussions, since these doctrines are meaningful only to members of particular religions.

== Tenure at the Center for Inquiry ==
In March, 2011, the Center for Inquiry launched an advertising campaign in various cities, with billboards and subway ads proclaiming "You don't need God–to hope, to care, to love, to live." The campaign received significant media attention. A second phase of the campaign was launched in the fall of 2011 based on donor support for the campaign.

In August, 2011, the Center for Inquiry and its affiliate, the Committee for Skeptical Inquiry, submitted petitions to the Food and Drug Administration, authored by Lindsay and Barry Karr, executive director of the Committee for Skeptical Inquiry. The petitions requested the agency to require homeopathic drugs to be tested for efficacy.

Along with the leaders of other secular organizations, Lindsay spoke at the Reason Rally, held on the National Mall in Washington, D.C. on March 24, 2012.

In 2014, the Center for Inquiry launched a web-based campaign to “Keep Health Care Safe and Secular,” focusing on reproductive rights, the dangers in alternative medicine, and the importance of vaccination.

Also in 2014, the Center for Inquiry prevailed in an appellate court case in which it sought equal rights for nonbelievers. The United States Court of Appeals for the Seventh Circuit ruled in Center for Inquiry v. Marion Circuit Court Clerk that nonreligious individuals have the right to choose secular celebrants to officiate at their weddings.

Lindsay and Center for Inquiry founder Paul Kurtz had disagreements over the operation of the organization which drew the attention of The New York Times. In January 2015, the Center for Inquiry carried out a corporate consolidation, merging with its two affiliates, the Committee for Skeptical Inquiry and the Council for Secular Humanism.

Lindsay was appointed as editor of the Free Inquiry magazine in July, 2024, taking over interim editor Andrea Szalanski.
