= Curtis W. Reese =

Curtis Williford Reese (September 3, 1887 – June 5, 1961) was a Unitarian minister and humanist. He was the dean of the Abraham Lincoln Center in Chicago.

Raised in a conservative Southern Baptist environment, his seminary studies of biblical criticism eroded his belief in an inerrant Bible. He turned to the Social Gospel movement and became increasingly liberal in his thoughts. By 1913 he found a spiritual home in the Unitarian denomination, and became an active minister in the Middle West. He preached humanism as a liberating force that was necessary for both intellectual vigor and improved society. His perspective was broadcast through several books: Humanism (1926), Humanist Sermons (1927) and The Meaning of Humanism (1945). While remaining a member of the Unitarian church, in 1930-1957 he was the dean of the Abraham Lincoln Center in Chicago, which served as a clearinghouse for humanists active in political and intellectual programs.
