= Lester Mondale =

The Reverend Robert Lester Mondale (May 28, 1904 – August 19, 2003) was an American Unitarian minister and Humanist. He is notable as having signed all three documents popularly called the Humanist Manifesto (the original 1933 one, the second one in 1973, and the third one in 2003 shortly before his death).

== Biography ==
Mondale was born in Walnut Grove, Minnesota, the son of Methodist minister and World War I hero Theodore Sigvaard Mondale and his first wife Jessie Alice Larson. Although his family was Methodist, he converted to Unitarianism while earning his B.A. from Hamline University. In 1926 Mondale entered the Unitarian ministry and in 1929 he earned an S.T.B. from Harvard Divinity School. He was ordained by the New North Unitarian Church, Hingham, Massachusetts, and went on to serve congregations in Evanston, Illinois, Kansas City, Missouri; Birmingham, Michigan; White Plains, New York; Tempe, Arizona; and Quincy, Illinois. His younger half-brother was Walter Mondale, Vice President of the United States under Jimmy Carter.

He was married three times. From his first wife, Edith Eldred Klose, he had one daughter, Tarand Elose Mondale Swenstad. From his second wife, Fay A. Smead, he had three daughters: Ellen Smead Mondale, Karen Smead Mondale and Julia Smead Kellum Mondale Jensen. He married his third wife, Rosemary Delap, on May 31, 1961.

== Selected publications ==
- The Missouri still runs wild, Westport Pub. Co. (Kansas City, MO) 1943
- Three Unitarian philosophies of religion, Beacon Press (Boston) 1946
- The Unitarian way of life, Beacon Press (Boston) 1943
- Values in world religions, Starr King Press 1958
- Preachers in Purgatory With Reference to Accounts of More Than a Hundred Ministers Reporting on Crisis Situations, Beacon Press 1966
- New Man of Religious Humanism, Volturna Press 1973
