= The Humanist =

American bi-monthly magazine

- Editor: Jennifer Bardi
- Categories: Secularism; humanism
- Frequency: Bi-monthly
- First issue: Spring 1941
- Company: American Humanist Association
- Country: United States
- Based in: Washington, D.C., US
- Language: English
- Website: thehumanist.com
- ISSN: 0018-7399
- OCLC: 1587384

The Humanist is an American bi-monthly magazine published in Washington, D.C. It was founded in 1941 by American Humanist Association. It covers topics in science, religion, media, technology, politics and popular culture and provides ethical critique and commentary on them. The magazine was originally published under the name of The New Humanist from 1928 to 1940 by a fellowship of American humanists based at the University of Chicago. The magazine has a small circulation, read principally by the three thousand members of the American Humanist Association.
