= Winnemac (fictional U.S. state) =

Fictional U.S. state

Winnemac is a fictional U.S. state invented by the writer Sinclair Lewis. His novel Babbitt takes place in Zenith, its largest city (population 361,000, according to a sketch-map Lewis made to guide his writing). Winnemac is also a setting for Gideon Planish, Arrowsmith, Elmer Gantry, and Dodsworth.

== Description ==
Lewis turned to the creation of a fictional locale after residents of Sauk Centre, Minnesota, were upset with the town's portrayal in Main Street. In one of the essays in "Sinclair Lewis: A Collection of Critical Essays" Mark Schorer describes "the state of Winnemac" as "more typical than any real state in the Union". In "The Last of the Provincials: The American Novel, 1915–1925" critic H. L. Mencken sees Winnemac as exemplifying the "standardized chain-store state" of the midwest. In his critical study of Sinclair Lewis, Sheldon Grebstein notes that the "average mid-western state called Winnemac" is an amalgamation of Wisconsin, Minnesota, and Michigan.

According to Helen Batchelor, following the breakthrough success of Main Street, Lewis conceived an ambitious plan for a series of interrelated novels that required a common fictional locale. Reviewing Lewis's last novel and his literary career, Malcolm Cowley says:

[Lewis] didn't write easy books after Main Street. He laid out for himself an extensive plan of work: he would invent the state of Winnemac, more typical than any real state in the Union, and in one book after another would describe the representative activities of its inhabitants, until he had completed a wide survey of American society.

In Arrowsmith, Lewis describes Winnemac thus:

The state of Winnemac is bounded by Michigan, Ohio, Illinois, and Indiana, and like them it is half Eastern, half Midwestern. There is a feeling of New England in its brick and sycamore villages, its stable industries, and a tradition which goes back to the Revolutionary War. Zenith, the largest city in the state, was founded in 1792. But Winnemac is Midwestern in its fields of corn and wheat, its red barns and silos, and, despite the immense antiquity of Zenith, many counties were not settled till 1860. The University of Winnemac is at Mohalis, fifteen miles from Zenith. There are twelve thousand students; beside this prodigy Oxford is a tiny theological school and Harvard a select college for young gentlemen. The University has a baseball field under glass; its buildings are measured by the mile; it hires hundreds of young Doctors of Philosophy to give rapid instruction in Sanskrit, navigation, accountancy, spectacle-fitting, sanitary engineering, Provencal poetry, tariff schedules, rutabaga-growing, motor-car designing, the history of Voronezh, the style of Matthew Arnold, the diagnosis of myohypertrophia kymoparalytica, and department-store advertising. Its president is the best money-raiser and the best after-dinner speaker in the United States; and Winnemac was the first school in the world to conduct its extension courses by radio.

Other novels mention that its capital is Galop de Vache, its river is the Chaloosa, and its important cities are Monarch, Sparta, Pioneer, Catawba, and Eureka. Lewis' novel Work of Art mentions the city of Golden Glow as 'the dirtiest and noisiest industrial huddle' in Winnemac.

== Lewis's map of Winnemac ==
According to Batchelor, in 1921, Lewis's wife wrote to a friend that Lewis had made "the most astonishingly complete set of maps of Zenith, so that the city, the suburbs, the state" were clear in his mind. John S. Mayfield of Syracuse University discovered the maps in Lewis's Vermont study in 1961. One map was entitled "The State in which is Zenith." Batchelor called it "the most exciting" and said that it was "of greater imaginative importance than the city [because it] provides in a greater way than Zenith the interrelatedness among these works." In 1934, an earlier commentator, George Annand, had deduced and published a "Map of Sinclair Lewis's United States," but the discovery of Lewis's own map showed significant differences. Winnemac "is much further north than had previously been thought... New York City is decidedly southeast of Zenith... Lake Michigan is simply ignored by Lewis in creating the state." Lewis's map places Zenith due east of Chicago and 17½ miles from the Illinois border. Besides those mentioned above, cities and towns on the map include Minnemegantic, Banjo Crossing, Roysburg, Tuttleville, Vulcan, Hamburg, New Paris, St. Ruan, Babylon, Chestnut Grove, Parkinton, Eureka, Aetna, Madrid, St. Agatha, and (of course) a Springfield.

== Bibliography ==
- A Map of Sinclair Lewis's United States as It Appears in His Novels. George Annand, Illustrator. New York, Doubleday, Doran, 1934 Geography & Map Division (60)
