= Ann Vickers (novel) =

1933 novel by Sinclair Lewis

- First edition cover (Doubleday)
- Author: Sinclair Lewis
- Publisher: Doubleday
- Publication date: 1933

Ann Vickers is a 1933 novel by Sinclair Lewis. It is a part of three feminist books that Lewis had written, the other two being Main Street and The Job. It was made into a 1933 drama film of the same name directed by John Cromwell, adapted by Jane Murfin.

== Plot ==
The novel follows the heroine, Ann Vickers, from tomboy school girl in the late 19th century American Midwest, through college, and into her forties. It charts her postgraduate suffragist phase in the early 20th century. As a suffragist, she is imprisoned, and her experiences there lead her to become interested in social work and prison reform. As a social worker in a settlement house during the First World War, she has her first sexual affair, becomes pregnant, and has an abortion. Later, having become successful running a modern and progressive prison for women, she marries a dull man, more out of loneliness than love.

Mired in a rather loveless marriage, she falls in love with a controversial (and perhaps corrupt) judge. Flouting both middle-class convention and that of her progressive social circle in New York, she becomes pregnant by the judge, having a son.
