= Boosterism =

Promoting a town or organization, with the goal of improving public perception of it

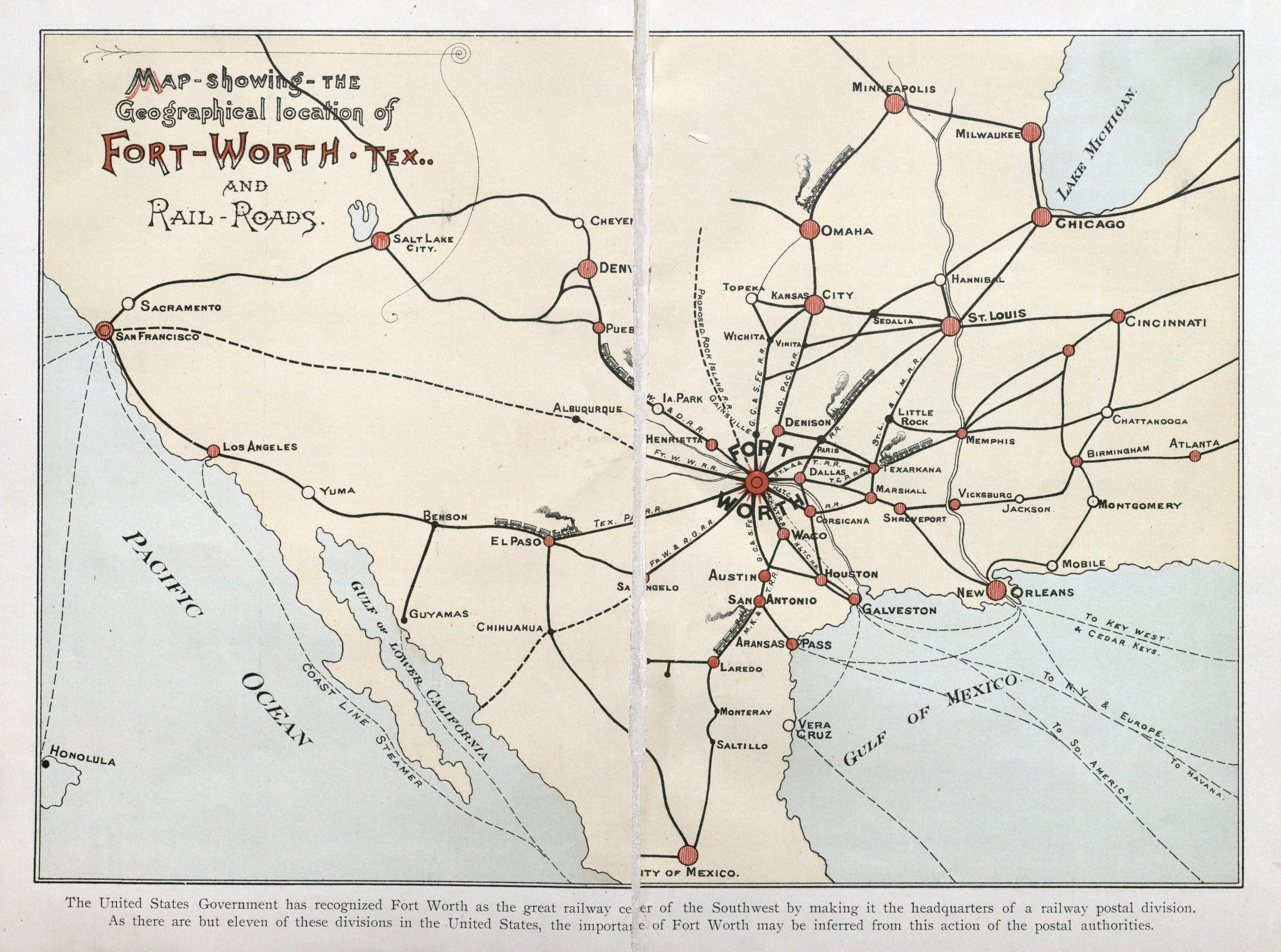
Map – showing – the Geographical location of Fort-Worth, Tex., and Rail-Roads, 1888

Boosterism is the act of promoting ("boosting") a town, city, or organization, with the goal of improving public perception of it. Particularly in a geographic context, boosterism is meant to encourage outsiders to invest or settle in the area. Boosting can be as simple as talking up the entity at a party or as elaborate as establishing a visitors' bureau.

== History ==
Greenland is claimed to owe its name to an act of boosterism. The Saga of Erik the Red states that Erik the Red named the island "Greenland" because "men will desire much the more to go there if the land has a good name."

During the expansion of the American and Canadian West, boosterism became epidemic as the leaders and owners of small towns made extravagant predictions for their settlement, in the hope of attracting more residents and, not coincidentally, inflating the prices of local real estate. During the nineteenth century, competition for economic success among newly founded cities led to overflow of booster literature that listed the visible signs of growth, cited statistics on population and trade and looked to local geography for town success reasons.

The 1871 humorous speech The Untold Delights of Duluth, delivered by Democratic U.S. Representative J. Proctor Knott, lampooned boosterism. Boosterism is also a major theme of two novels by Sinclair Lewis—Main Street (published 1920) and Babbitt (1922). As indicated by an editorial that Lewis wrote in 1908 entitled "The Needful Knocker", boosting was the opposite of knocking. The editorial explained:

The booster's enthusiasm is the motive force which builds up our American cities. Granted. But the hated knocker's jibes are the check necessary to guide that force. In summary then, we do not wish to knock the booster, but we certainly do wish to boost the knocker.

The short story "Jeeves and the Hard-boiled Egg" (1917) by P.G. Wodehouse includes an encounter with a convention visiting from the fictional town of Birdsburg, Missouri who talk up their town:

"You should pay it a visit," he said. "The most rapidly-growing city in the country. Boost for Birdsburg!" "Boost for Birdsburg!" said the other chappies reverently.

Boosting is also done in political settings, especially in regard to disputed policies or controversial events. The former UK prime minister Boris Johnson is strongly associated with such behaviour.

The Oxford English Dictionary identifies the term boosterism (and the associated sense of the verb boost) as a US colloquialism.

== See also ==
- Advertising
- Potemkin village
- Promotion (marketing)
- Puffery
- Red states and blue states
