= The Man Who Knew Coolidge =

1928 novel by Sinclair Lewis

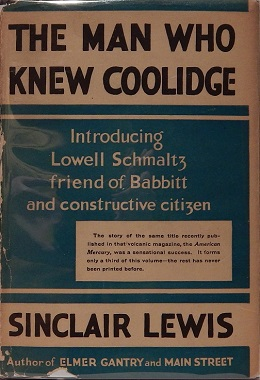
- First edition cover, with jacket, 1928.
- Author: Sinclair Lewis
- Language: English
- Publisher: Harcourt Brace (US); Jonathan Cape (UK)
- Publication date: April 5, 1928
- Publication place: United States
- Media type: Hardcover
- Pages: 275
- Preceded by: Elmer Gantry
- Followed by: Dodsworth
- Text: The Man Who Knew Coolidge at Wikisource

The Man Who Knew Coolidge is a 1928 satirical novel by Sinclair Lewis. It features the return of several characters from Lewis' previous works, including George Babbitt and Elmer Gantry. Additionally, it sees a return to the familiar territory of Lewis' fictional American city of Zenith, in the state of Winnemac. Presented as six long, uninterrupted monologues by Lowell Schmaltz, a travelling salesman in office supplies, the eponymous first section was originally published in The American Mercury in 1927.

== Plot ==
The Man Who Knew Coolidge (subtitled "Being the Soul of Lowell Schmaltz, Constructive and Nordic Citizen") is recounted in a series of six long, uninterrupted monologues by the sub-titular Schmaltz. As the reader progresses through each, Schmaltz gradually reveals additional details about his background, circumstances, and character. Intended by Lewis as a light intermission between the more substantial Elmer Gantry and his 1929 novel, Dodsworth, The Man Who Knew Coolidge is written in a lighter and more humorous vein than Lewis' best-remembered novels of the 1920s.

=== Part 1: The Man Who Knew Coolidge ===
While travelling in a Pullman coach, Lowell Schmaltz takes advantage of a lull in conversation with a group of gentlemen to tell a tale. Schmaltz recounts by long and elliptical digressions how he came to know the then-President of the United States, Calvin Coolidge. He describes a visit to the White House, undertaken to look in on "Cal". Early in the narrative, Schmaltz's character acknowledges what will be a key characteristic of the remaining five sections of the novel when he states: "I'm afraid I'm getting a little off the subject of Coolidge, and if there's anything I hate it's a fellow that if he starts to talk about a subject he can't stick to it" (p. 17).

Schmaltz recounts his youth in Fall River, Massachusetts, where his father, according to his narrative, was "the leading corn and feed merchant in all his section of Fall River." Unfortunately for Schmaltz, his father "invested his savings in a perpetual motion machine company that had little or no value. He died, and it was quite sudden, in December of my Freshman year, so I had to go back home and take up the burden of helping support the family (p. 22)." The claim regarding the date of his father's death and Schmaltz's departure from college is contradicted later in the book.

Schmaltz gives several alleged examples of conversations he recalls having had with Coolidge, such as: "I said, "Well, it's going to be a cold winter," and he came right back, "Yep." (p. 24)."

A footnote on the first page of the section states that Coolidge was President from 1923 to 1929, which may appear odd considering that The Man Who Knew Coolidge was published in 1928. But Lewis knew that if Coolidge lived out his term, he would hold office into the year following the 1928 election. Coolidge succeeded to the Presidency on the unexpected death of President Warren G. Harding on August 2, 1923, and had won re-election in 1924, defeating both Democratic candidate John W. Davis and Progressive candidate Robert M. La Follette. However, he had declared in 1927 that he did not intend to seek re-election. This announcement followed and was partly due to the death of his son, Calvin Jr., from an infection in a blister gained while playing tennis on the White House court. Calvin Jr. died on July 7, 1924. Five years later, in 1929, Coolidge wrote: "When he [Calvin Jr.] went, the power and the glory of the Presidency went with him...I don't know why such a price was exacted for occupying the White House." Fellow Republican and former Harding Cabinet member Herbert Hoover would go on to win the 1928 Presidential election.

=== Part 2: The Story by Mack McMack ===
The second soliloquy takes place in a hotel in Chicago, Schmaltz having just taken a train down from Zenith, Winnemac, the night before. Over a game of cards, Schmaltz once again begins a singular and long-winded discursion.

=== Part 3: You Know How Women Are ===
Lowell Schmaltz is attempting to prevail upon his cousin Walt to lend him money to keep his business afloat, on the strength of a new concession, "the exclusive Zenith agency for Zenith for these new cash registers – and say, what the cash register means, what it means to the modern and efficient conduct of business..." (p. 163) But cousin Walt is clearly hesitant, as Schmaltz replies to him: "And I certainly do admit all your criticisms, and I'm going to ponder on 'em and try to profit by 'em" (p. 164).

Already, Schmaltz also admits not only that he flunked out of Amherst, but that his father died nine months after his departure, not before as he alleged in Part 1. However, he remains defiantly insistent that he did in fact know Calvin Coolidge: "But it's not true, as you kind of hinted and suggested, that I didn't know President Coolidge in college. It's a fact that for some years I did have him mixed up with another fellow in our class that looked something like him, but here some time ago I happened to run into this other fellow, and now I've got the two of 'em perfectly straight" (p. 165).

Schmaltz asserts, however, that his real trouble is in fact his wife, Mamie. "She means well, and as far as her lights lead her, she does everything she can for me, but the fact is she don't quite understand me, and say, the way she drives me and makes demands on me and everything, why say, it just about drives me crazy."

"And Delmerine same way. Thinking the Old Man's made of money!" (p. 167).

Schmaltz goes on to list some of the ways in which his wife holds him back and keeps him down. These include her wanting him to be a man of the house, to buy her the latest gadgets and clothes, to "carve the duck and fix the furnace", and the like. Although Lowell would like to get a dog, it would upset Mamie's cat. When Lowell gets a canary instead, the cat eats it. And when he picks up a stray dog, she insists that he get rid of it.

It is then that Schmaltz reveals a Babbitt-esque flirtation with an artist of his acquaintance, the thirty-eight-year-old Erica, whom he meets on the sly when he's in New York.

Schmaltz reveals that he is fifty-five years old (p. 202).

Ending his conversation with a renewed plea for funds, Lowell reminds Walt of the good times they had as children, and says: "...you and me always did understand each other, Walt, and don't forget that there's no firm in the world could give you better security for the loan."

=== Part 4: You Know How Relatives Are ===
In the shortest piece in the book, Lowell Schmaltz reports back to Mamie on his negotiations with Walt to arrange the loan. "But you know how relatives are," he says. "I could see he was crazy to make a loan on security like I can give him, but he tried to pretend he was holding off, and I had to sit around a whole evening listening to his wife and him chewing the rag (p. 208)."

Schmaltz then proceeds to reverse entirely the stories that he told to Walt in the previous section, saying that, with reference to Jackie the dog, that Walt asked him if the dog stayed in the house, and that Walt also asked him if "on all these trips you make to New York, haven't you ever picked up a nice little piece of fluff?" (p. 209). Which Lowell then proceeds to deny, despite having told Walt otherwise.

The section ends with Schmaltz recounting how he was frustrated in his effort to order buckwheat pancakes on the train home.

=== Part 5: Travel Is So Broadening ===
At a dinner of fried chicken with Mr and Mrs George Babbitt, Schmaltz recounts the trip that he almost made from Zenith to Yellowstone Park. In fact, Schmaltz explains that: "It's true that when I gave my little talk before the West Side Bridge Club about my trip, they billed it – and in a brief way the West Side Tidings colluding of the Evening Advocate spoke of it – as an account of a trip clear to Yellowstone Park."

"But it wasn't a trip clear to Yellowstone Park. The fact is, and I've always been the first to acknowledge it, I didn't get clear to Yellowstone Park but only to the Black Hills, in North Dakota." (p. 216)

Schmaltz proceeds to advise Babbitt on the equipment that he will need for his journey. He recounts some stories of his own adventure, which include a stop at a garage in the village of New Paris, Minnesota, reminiscent of that operated by Milton Daggett in Lewis' earlier novel Free Air (although that garage was located in the village of Schoenstrom, according to the earlier work) (p. 240).

The chapter ends with Schmaltz and his wife realising the time and finding that they must leave, with Schmaltz lamenting that he has not even gotten to the part about travelling to the Black Hills.

=== Part 6: The Basic and Fundamental Ideas of Christian American Citizenship ===
The final part of The Man Who Knew Coolidge is the text of a presentation given by Schmaltz at the Men's Club of the Pilgrim Congregational Church. Schmaltz notes the presence not only of a Dr Otto Hickenlooper in the audience, but also of one Dr Elmer Gantry, "formerly of Wellspring Methodist, but now so gloriously located in New York" (p. 252).

Schmaltz indulges in a discourse on the virtues of "service and practicalness" in America. As an example of opportunities for a practical person in early 20th century America, Schmaltz cites 1928 Democratic Presidential candidate Al Smith, saying: "Take like Al Smith. Here is a poor boy of the city streets, and a Catholic, and yet we have permitted him to be Governor of New York. Naturally, I'm opposed to his being President, but I've been perfectly willing to see him rise as far as he has, and while he's almost certainly never heard of me, if he were here I'd be glad to give him the hand and good wishes of Lowell Schmaltz!" (p. 269).

Schmaltz also decries the "notoriety-hunting hacks" who have defamed the memories of the likes of George Washington, Henry Ward Beecher, and Warren G. Harding. Of the latter, he says: "And no less than three disgraceful books, two of them novels and one a screed by a woman claiming to have known him too intimately, have dared to hint that our Martyr President, Harding himself, was a dumb-bell surrounded by crooks" (p. 272). The books referenced are the 1926 scandal-drama, Revelry by Samuel Hopkins Adams, 1927's The President's Daughter by Nan Britton, and Henry Ward Beecher: An American Portrait, a 1927 biography by Paxton Hibben.

Schmaltz ends his talk, and the book, by proclaiming: "to express modestly to you the motto of Lowell Schmaltz: "Read widely, think scientifically, speak briefly, and sell the goods!"" (p. 275).

== Publication history ==
The lengthy first section, which originally appeared in The American Mercury, was an adaptation of a monologue that Lewis had performed during the writing of Elmer Gantry. After its American Mercury publication in 1927, Lewis elected to expand The Man Who Knew Coolidge into a full book, stating that he could "write this stuff at incredible speed" and predicting possible sales of as many as 200,000 copies in correspondence with Harcourt. Calling the completed book his "swan-song to Babbittism", he delivered the completed material to his publisher before the end of 1927

The Man Who Knew Coolidge was published to lukewarm reviews by Harcourt in 1928, and by Jonathan Cape in the United Kingdom in the same year. In the United States, although Lewis imagined The Man Who Knew Coolidge selling as many as 200,000 copies, it actually sold only 20,000 of its initial 30,000 print run, with the left-overs being remaindered. Since its first publication, it has been infrequently reprinted and is one of Lewis' lesser-known and more poorly regarded works.

== Reception and critical opinion ==
Mark Schorer notes in his 1961 biography of Lewis that reception of The Man Who Knew Coolidge was mixed. It suffered both unfavorable reviews, including critic Heywood Broun calling it "the dullest writing ever to come from a first-class writing man", and favorable notices, among the latter being a front page appearance on the New York Times Book Review section. Schorer himself appeared unimpressed, calling The Man Who Knew Coolidge "[a] more trivial project".

Lewis' most recent biographer, Richard Lingeman, devotes very little space to The Man Who Knew Coolidge: in 554 pages there are only two mentions of it.

== Bibliography ==
- The Rise of Sinclair Lewis, 1920–1930, by James M. Hutchisson. The Pennsylvania State University Press, 1996.
- The Man Who Knew Coolidge, by Sinclair Lewis, Harcourt, Brace & Company, 1928.
- Sinclair Lewis: Rebel from Main Street, by Richard Lingeman, Random House, 2002.
- Sinclair Lewis: An American Life, by Mark Schorer, McGraw-Hill Book Company, Inc., 1961.
