= Sinclair Lewis Boyhood Home =

Historic house in Minnesota, United States

- U.S. National Register of Historic Places
- U.S. National Historic Landmark
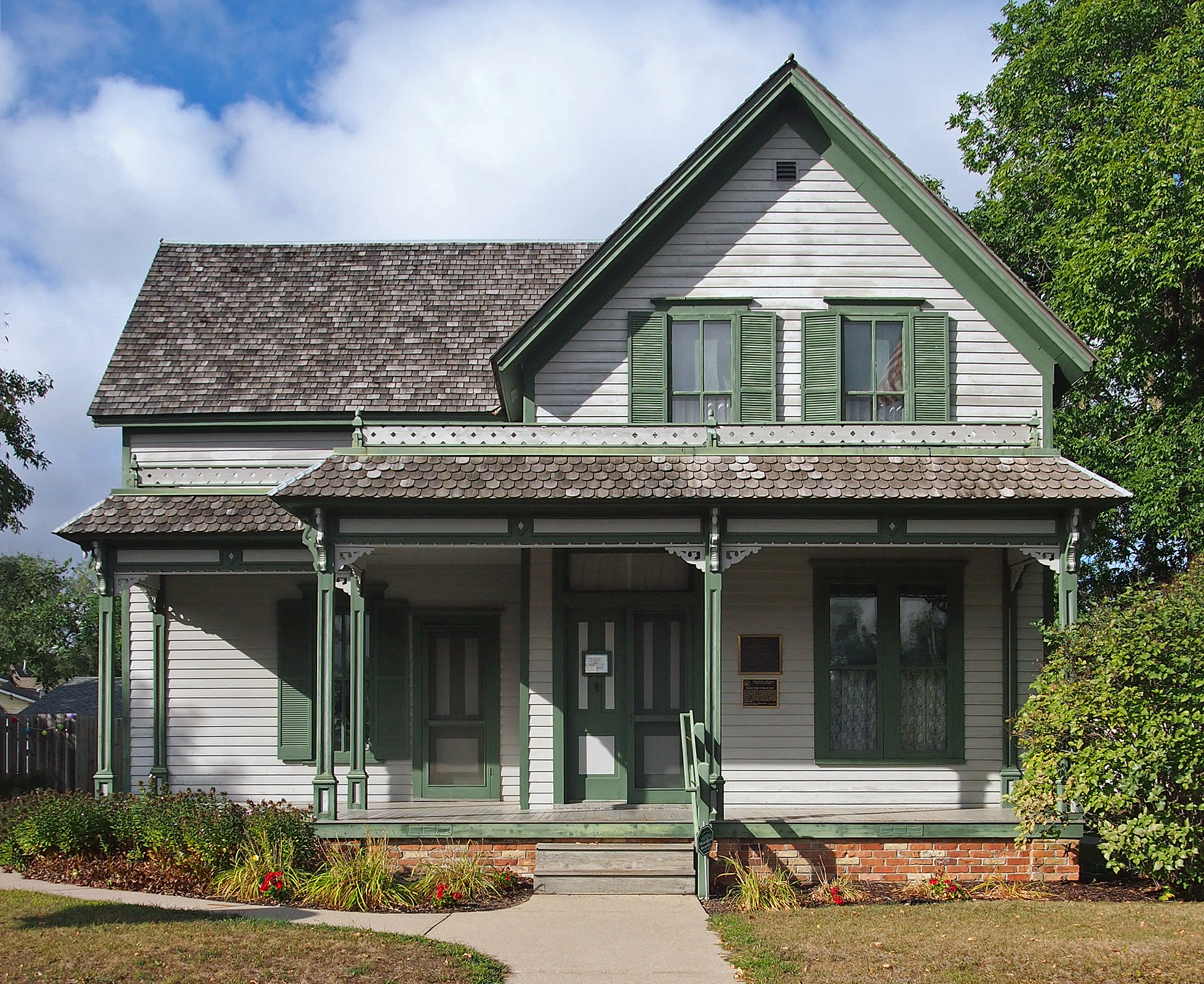
- The Sinclair Lewis Boyhood Home viewed from the south

- Location within Minnesota Location within the United States
- Location: 812 Sinclair Lewis Avenue, Sauk Centre, Minnesota
- Coordinates: 45°44′14″N 94°57′26.5″W
- Area: Less than one acre
- Built: 1889
- Architectural style: Gothic Revival
- NRHP reference No.: 68000027
- Designated NHL: May 23, 1968

The Sinclair Lewis Boyhood Home is a historic house museum and National Historic Landmark in Sauk Centre, Minnesota, United States. From 1889 until 1902 it was the home of young Sinclair Lewis (1885–1951), who would become the most famous American novelist of the 1920s and the first American to receive the Nobel Prize in Literature. His most famous book, Main Street, was inspired by the town of Sauk Centre as Lewis perceived it from this home.

The Sinclair Lewis Foundation acquired the house in 1956 and restored the house to its appearance during Lewis's boyhood. The Sauk Centre Historical Society has become the new owner in 2026. They offer tours regularly during the summer and by appointment throughout the rest of the year.

== Description ==
The Sinclair Lewis Boyhood Home is a two-story wood-frame building with an L-shaped footprint. It has a gable roof and clapboard siding. An open porch extends across the front façade, with slender, square-paneled posts supporting the porch roof and decorated with brackets and an entablature.

The interior contains eight rooms. The ground floor consists of a living room, dining room, and kitchen, the latter of which lets out into a small, enclosed porch. Upstairs are four bedrooms plus a bathroom which featured running water and a flush toilet.

At the rear of the lot stands a 1½-story frame carriage house.

== Lewis residency ==
The Lewis family—headed by father Edwin J. Lewis and mother Emma Kermott Lewis—initially lived in a house directly across from this one on the south side of the street. Sinclair Lewis was born in that house on February 7, 1885, joining two older brothers, Fred (born 1875) and Claude (born 1878). When Lewis was just a few months old the family moved across the street into this house.

Edwin Lewis was a physician and conducted his medical practice out of the house, as was common at the time. Emma Lewis died in 1891, when Lewis was six. The following year Dr. Lewis married Isabel Warner, whose company young Lewis apparently enjoyed. He began reading books at a young age and kept a diary. He began writing as well, sometimes in the garret of the carriage house.

Dr. Lewis was a stern disciplinarian who had difficulty relating to his sensitive, unathletic third son. Throughout his lonely boyhood, the ungainly Lewis—tall, extremely thin, stricken with acne, and somewhat pop-eyed—had trouble gaining friends and pined after various local girls. At the age of 13 he unsuccessfully ran away from home, wanting to become a drummer boy in the Spanish–American War. In late 1902, at the age of 17, Lewis finally left Sauk Centre to attend school on the East Coast, ultimately graduating from Yale University in 1908.

Lewis's experiences growing up in Sauk Centre were the inspiration for his first novel, Main Street, published in 1920. Many episodes in the novel derive from real events in his youth. More crucially, he bared his frustrations with his outsider status, extolling small-town values while savaging those who were hypocritical about them. Main Street brought Lewis swift international fame. However the residents of Sauk Centre recognized the real-life inspirations in the novel's fictional town of Gopher Prairie and were offended.

== Later history ==
By the mid-20th century the house had been converted to a duplex, with the lower level dining room converted into a bedroom and bathroom and a kitchen installed on the second floor. Other alterations included stucco applied to the exterior, the ground floor kitchen partitioned and the door to the rear porch sealed, floors replaced, the front porch enclosed, and a dormer added to the roofline. In 1956 the Sinclair Lewis Foundation acquired the house. With assistance from the Minnesota Historical Society, they restored the house to its appearance during the time of Lewis's residence. In addition to reverting the numerous alterations, they brought back period wallpaper, reroofed the house and carriage house, installed HVAC equipment in the basement, and restored the grounds. The restoration was largely funded by the Foundation's sale of the Sinclair Lewis birthplace house across the street, and was completed in 2003. The house is now furnished with appropriate period items, including several genuinely owned by the Lewis family.

== See also ==
- List of National Historic Landmarks in Minnesota
- List of residences of American writers
- National Register of Historic Places listings in Stearns County, Minnesota
