= Fictional location =

Place that exists only in fiction and not in reality

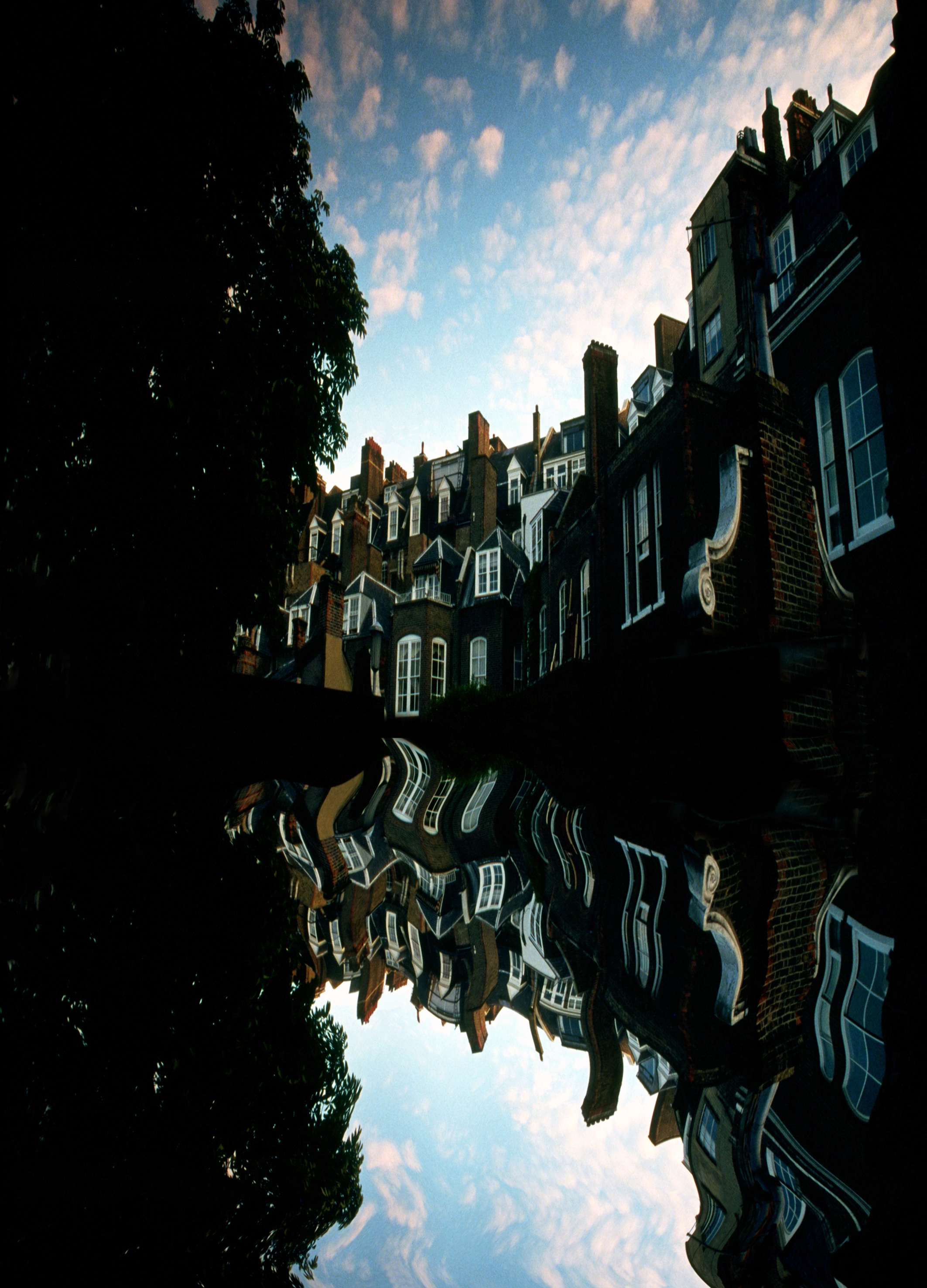
1 Knightsbridge, Walton Street, London

Fictional locations are places that exist only in fiction and not in reality, such as the Negaverse or Wonderland. They can also be inspired by actually existing locations. Writers may create and describe such places to serve as a backdrop for their fictional works. Fictional locations are also created for use as settings in role-playing games such as Dungeons & Dragons.

They may also be used for technical reasons in actual reality for use in the development of specifications, such as the fictional country of Bookland, which is used to allow EAN "country" codes 978 and 979 to be used for ISBN numbers assigned to books, and code 977 to be assigned for use for ISSN numbers on magazines and other periodicals.

Fictional locations vary greatly in their size. Very small places like a single room are kept out of the umbrella of fictional locations by convention, as are most single buildings.

A fictional location can be the size of a university (H. P. Lovecraft's Miskatonic University), a town (Stephen King's Salem's Lot), a county (William Faulkner's Yoknapatawpha County), a state (Winnemac in various Sinclair Lewis stories), a country, a large section of continent (as in north-western Middle-earth, which supposedly represents Europe), a whole planet (Anne McCaffrey's Pern), a whole galaxy (the Star Wars galaxy), even a multiverse (His Dark Materials).

In a larger scale, occasionally the term alternate reality is used, but only if it is considered a variant of Earth rather than an original world. Austin Tappan Wright's Islandia has an invented continent, Karain, on our world. However in fanfiction, along with pastiche and/or parody, it is not considered canon unless they get authorized.

== Locating a story ==
Within narrative prose, providing a believable location can be greatly enhanced by the provision of maps and other illustrations. This is often considered particularly true for fantasy novels and historical novels which often make great use of the map, but applies equally to science fiction and mysteries: earlier, in mainstream novels by Anthony Trollope, William Faulkner, etc. Fantasy and science fiction novels often also provide sections which provide documentation of various aspects of the environment of the fiction, including languages, character lists, cultures and, of course, locations.

In an online article on writing Dawn Arkin writes about the importance of location to the author's art:

Setting has become a very important part of most novels. Creating a fictional location has many advantages for the writer. You get to name the town, streets, businesses, schools, etc. Everything inside your town is under your control.

— Dawn Arkin, What Should Your Story's Setting Be?, EzineArticles, 7 September 2006

Maps are an immediate necessity for some works, as they do not take place on Earth. Writers need working maps to keep straight at a glance whether the castle is north or south of the river, and how long it takes to get between valleys. This can be very helpful in preventing snags when dealing directly with fictional geography.

Authors are as forgetful and absent-minded as the lesser breeds of humankind, and a simple precaution like taking a moment to sketch out a map helps prevent such errors and inconsistencies (upon which eagle-eyed readers are bound to swoop with gleeful cries, thereafter sitting down to write nasty letters to the poor author).

— Lin Carter, "Of World-Making: Some Problems of the Invented Milieu", Imaginary Worlds: the Art of Fantasy, New York: Ballantine Books, 1973

Sometimes an actual geographic corner is used as a model for "getting it right", and identifying these can become a game for readers. Authors may turn an island into a continent or vice versa, rotate orientation, or combine two similar locales to get the best (for the story) of both.

== See also ==
- Fictitious telephone number
- Fictional universe
- List of fictional locations
- List of mythological places
- Phantom island
- Category:Fictional locations
