= Elmer Gantry =

1927 satirical novel by Sinclair Lewis

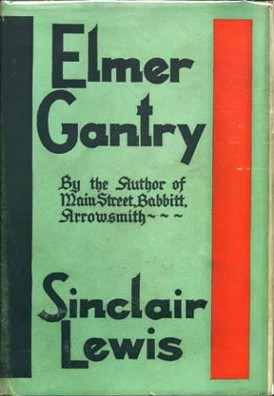
- First edition cover
- Author: Sinclair Lewis
- Language: English
- Publisher: Harcourt Trade Publishers
- Publication date: March 1927
- Publication place: United States
- Pages: 432
- OCLC: 185039547

Elmer Gantry is a 1927 American satirical novel by Sinclair Lewis that satirizes religious activity in evangelistic circles and public attitudes toward such activity during the 1920s. The novel centers on Elmer Gantry, an ambitious, corrupt minister who rises to prominence in the Methodist Church despite his hypocrisy, sexual misconduct, and opportunism.

Lewis researched the novel in 1926 with the assistance of the Unitarian minister Leon Milton Birkhead, a former Methodist whose knowledge of American religious life helped shape the work.

Elmer Gantry was published in the United States by Harcourt Trade Publishers in March 1927 and dedicated to H. L. Mencken. The novel was a commercial success and the best-selling work of fiction in the United States in 1927, but it also provoked widespread public controversy, being banned in Boston and other cities and drawing strong criticism from religious figures. The novel has been adapted for the stage, film, musical theatre, and opera.

== Background and writing ==
In 1926, Lewis came to Kansas City to research a novel critical of ministers and fundamental Christianity. For novels on subjects that Lewis had little familiarity with, he often sought the aid of a subject-matter expert; for his 1925 critique of science culture, Arrowsmith, he received the aid of microbiologist Paul de Kruif. He came to Kansas City as it was the residence of moderate minister Bill Stidger, who had encouraged him to write a novel about preachers when they met on the Chautauqua circuit in 1922. Lewis planned for Stidger to be the subject-matter expert for Elmer Gantry, and Stidger spent a few weeks guiding Lewis around the city and introduced him to many ministers. However, Lewis soon met the Unitarian minister Leon Milton Birkhead, a former Methodist, with the circumstances of their meeting being contested. Biographers of H. L. Mencken, who had met and become friends with Birkhead while he was aiding the defense in the Scopes Monkey Trial in 1925, say that he put forward Birkhead's name to serve as Lewis's aide. Birkhead knew of Lewis and had favorably reviewed his novels. Birkhead said he met Lewis at a party in January 1926 and, while profiling Birkhead, The New Yorker journalist Ely Jacques Kahn Jr. said that Birkhead was introduced to Lewis by another minister. Biographers of Lewis generally conclude that Stidger brought Lewis into contact with Birkhead, possibly by bringing Lewis along to a meeting of the Southwest Federation of Religious Liberals, a group that Birkhead organized and which met semi-regularly.

At that meeting, Birkhead said that Lewis decided he wanted him to be his technical advisor, replacing Stidger. Before Lewis left Kansas City on January 28, it had been arranged that Birkhead would guide him when he returned in April. Lewis considered Birkhead's contribution to be similar to de Kruif's, although unlike de Kruif, who was an uncredited author of Arrowsmith and received 25% of its royalties, Birkhead did not write any of Elmer Gantry or receive any royalties. Various explanations have been put forward for why Lewis picked Birkhead. Birkhead thought Lewis picked him as he was able to smoke and swear in his presence. Lewis sometimes repeated that reasoning; on other occasions, he said that it was because Birkhead had a sense of humor and was knowledgeable about Eastern religions. In May 1926, Lewis would write to Harcourt Trade Publishers, his publisher, and say:

I couldn't have a better man than Birkhead to give me dope. Personally most charming as well as most learned, young enough to be comradely, he has had ten years as a Methodist preacher, ten as a Unitarian, both observantly; and though he doesn't even smoke, he enjoys language of the type made holy by Paul [de Kruif] and Spike [Hunt] and myself.

— Sinclair Lewis

Lewis returned in April and stayed at the Birkheads home. Lewis said he had most of the novel sketched out and Birkhead said Lewis had already begun working on an outline when Lewis arrived. Lewis had the Southwest Federation of Religious Liberals meet weekly on Sunday under his guidance. The group has since been referred to as "Sinclair Lewis's Sunday School Class" or "Sinclair Lewis's Laboratory", with its existence before Lewis arrived often forgotten. It was made up of about 15 ministers, mostly liberal, from disparate denominations; most were Protestant, but it included an agnostic leader of the Rationalist Society, a Roman Catholic priest, and Rabbi Samuel S. Mayerberg. Stidger was part of the group. It had few conservatives and no fundamentalists, with there being little record of Lewis meeting with any fundamentalists at all. Most writers conclude that it was largely made up of "charlatans and opportunists" or "clowns and hypocrites", while noting that Birkhead was "noble and good", although John Tyler Blake argued that these characterizations have little basis in fact. At the meetings, Lewis and the ministers would engage in discussions about religion and he would interrogate the morality of the ministers and attack them.

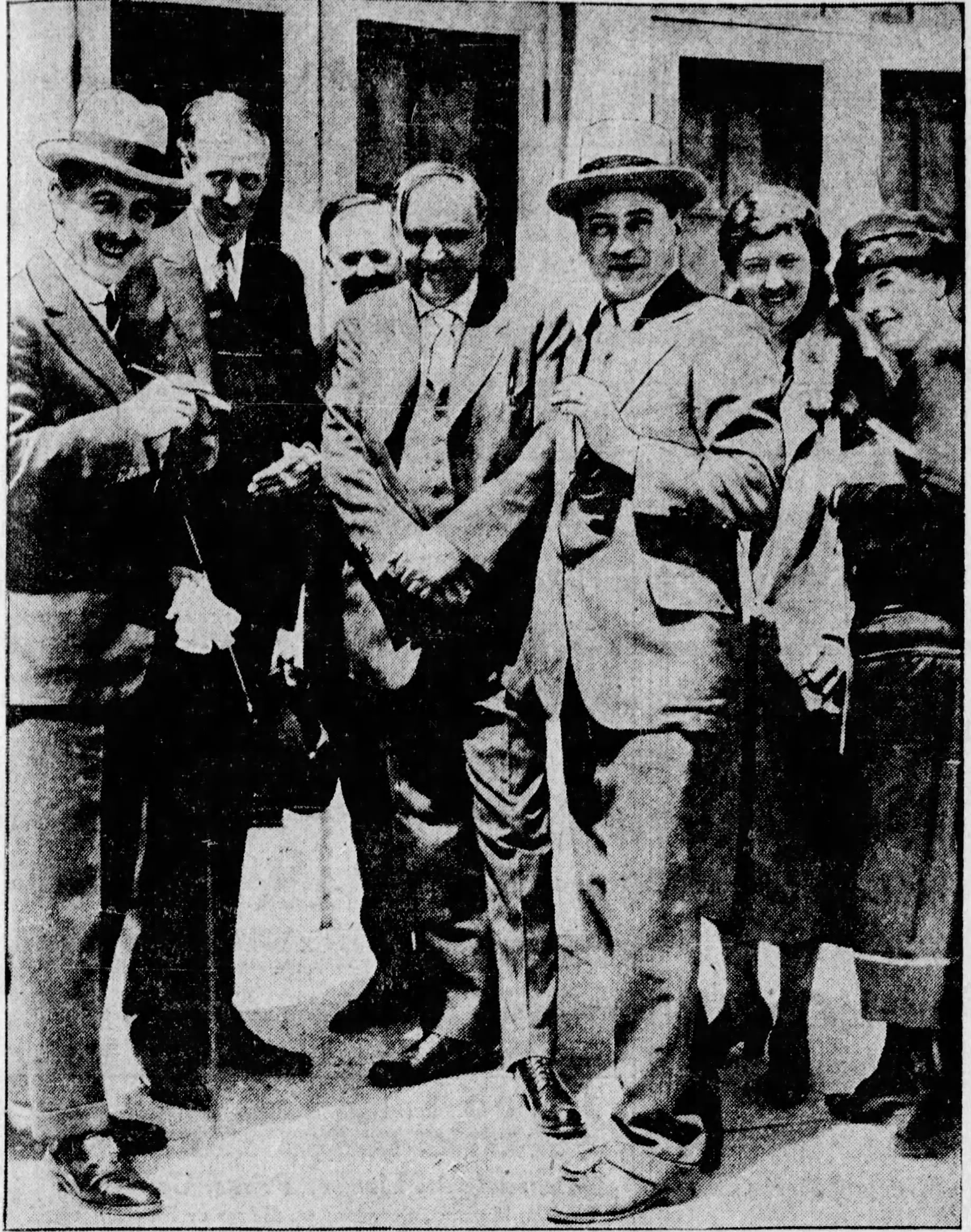
After a meeting of the Sunday School on May 16, 1926. From left to right: Gilbert Frankau, Lewis, Birkhead, Clarence Darrow, Emanuel Haldeman-Julius, Birkhead's wife, and Darrow's wife.

Lewis's research included acquiring a library of about 200 books relating to ministry, nearly all of which were recommended by Birkhead. Also in April, Lewis was awarded and declined the 1926 Pulitzer Prize for Arrowsmith. Birkhead also recounted his own memories and experiences to Lewis. While he was in Kansas City, Lewis also gave various provocative speeches at various pulpits, beginning with a speech he delivered at Birkhead's church that was nearly identical in substance to a speech Birkhead delivered in January. One April 18 speech in particular, where Lewis challenged God to strike him down, garnered significant attention. Lewis left Kansas City on May 15. I. M. Hargett, a minister who Lewis clashed with, would advertise multiple May sermons after Lewis left with the sentence "Sinclair Lewis and Dr. Birkhead writing a preacher book. Woe to us preachers".

Lewis came to rural Pequot Lakes, Minnesota, on June 3 to write the novel; the Birkhead family joined him a week later. Lewis and his Hawaiian chefs stayed in two tents while the Birkhead family stayed in a cabin nearby that Lewis had requisitioned from a friend. Lewis's nieces and Birkhead's son Kenneth took a mutual interest in each other. Passersby recalled that the Birkheads stayed close to Lewis to help him write the novel, with Birkhead providing his knowledge and acting as a sounding board while his wife Agnes worked as a stenographer and housekeeper. In late August, Lewis's father died; soon after Lewis and the Birkheads returned from his funeral, Lewis prepared to leave Pequot. Lewis's wife opposed his proposal that they travel Europe with Birkhead so he could finish the novel. The Birkheads soon left, with about one-half or two-thirds of the novel complete; Lewis finished the rest without them. In Kahn's profile, he says that Elmer Gantry was originally going to be dedicated to Birkhead, but Lewis thought it would ruin Birkhead if an anti-ministerial book was dedicated to him, an active minister. It was instead dedicated to their good friend Mencken. Lewis arranged it so that he was in Europe when Elmer Gantry was published in March 1927. He asked the Birkheads to join him, but Birkhead declined because he wanted to be in the United States when the novel was published.

The character of Sharon Falconer was reportedly based on events in the career of the radio evangelist Aimee Semple McPherson, who founded the Pentecostal Christian denomination known as the International Church of the Foursquare Gospel in 1927. Lewis reportedly finished the book while mending a broken leg on Jackfish Island in Rainy Lake, Minnesota. Many details in Elmer Gantry are derived from the Sunday School meetings, Birkhead's memories, and the books Birkhead provided. Birkhead is often put forward as the basis of the character Frank Shallard and he bears strong similarities to the character. Birkhead denied being the basis of Shallard. Birkhead also likely influenced the character Andrew Pengilly. John Tyler Blake, in his PhD dissertation on Elmer Gantry, noted multiple similarities between Birkhead and Elmer Gantry.

George Babbitt, the namesake of one of Lewis' better-known novels, briefly appears in Elmer Gantry, and the character Elmer Gantry appears as a minor character in two of his lesser-known novels, The Man Who Knew Coolidge (1928) and Gideon Planish (1943). Birkhead, who had become an anti-fascist propagandist, consulted with Lewis while he was writing Gideon Planish.

== Synopsis ==
Elmer Gantry, a young, narcissistic, and womanizing college athlete, abandons an early ambition to become a lawyer as the legal profession does not suit the unethical Gantry. After college, he attends a Baptist seminary, and is ordained as a minister. He successfully hides sexual involvements that are prohibited, but is thrown out of the seminary before completing his bachelor of divinity because he is too drunk to appear at a church where he is supposed to preach.

After several years as a traveling salesman of farm equipment, Gantry becomes a confidante of Sharon Falconer, a popular evangelist and motivational speaker who has her own traveling "road church". Gantry becomes her lover, but she and scores of individuals attending one of her meetings are killed in a catastrophic fire in her tent tabernacle, costing Gantry his relationship and position. Afterwards, he briefly acts as a "New Thought" evangelist, and eventually becomes a Methodist minister.

Gantry marries a local parishioner. Although he is unhappy with her sexual frigidity, he remains with her for sake of appearances. Years later, Methodist leaders award him a larger congregation in the city of Zenith. With his career and power at their peak, Gantry manipulates local, state and national political figures, resulting in police raids against bootleggers and bar patrons.

Gantry's corruption and power hunger contribute to the downfall, physical injury, and even death of key people around him, including a former associate, Frank Shallard, a sincere minister who questions the moral purpose of his church. Shallard is nearly beaten to death by Gantry loyalists who are angered by perceived "atheistic" divergences from Christian teachings.

Gantry's career comes close to a major scandal when one of his affairs turns out to involve a husband and wife blackmail team. Gantry is helped in avoiding potential downfall by a close friend, and via political alliances with Deacon Eversley, a powerful lawyer; and a private detective agency. A thoroughly repentant Gantry swears to abstain from his sinful proclivities. As the book closes, Gantry notices a younger woman during a closing sermon scene.

== Publication history ==
- Lewis, Sinclair (March 1927). Elmer Gantry (First ed.). New York, NY: Harcourt Trade Publishers. OCLC 185039547.

== Reception ==
Sinclair's Elmer Gantry was a commercial success, and was the best-selling work of fiction in America for 1927 (according to Publishers Weekly). However, on its publication, it created a public furor—it was banned in Boston and in other cities, and denounced from pulpits across the United States. Contemporary Sinclair Lewis biographer Mark Schorer notes that one cleric suggested Lewis be imprisoned for five years; others note that evangelist Billy Sunday threatened to beat him up and called him "Satan's cohort", and Lewis reportedly received an invitation to his own lynching.

The public furor extended to the Kansas City ministers Lewis had consulted. Stidger attacked the novel as inaccurate, also saying that Lewis was drunk while writing it. Birkhead strenuously denied that claim; Lewis was drunk while writing large portions of it. Stidger accused Lewis of cowardice in not responding to him and accurately said that he was hiding in Europe. Lewis would privately write "Bill Stidger in his comments on my book must have been hit hard from the way he squeals! I shan't answer him; Birkhead will do that". Birkhead engaged in an exhaustive and extensive defense of Lewis and the novel, praising it as accurate and attacking Stidger. He was the novel's most active and energetic defender. Birkhead gained nationwide publicity and his congregation increased in size; only Lewis profited more from the novel. Most critics conclude that Birkhead was correct on the merits of the debate. Some members of Birkhead's church left as a result of his defense of the novel.

=== Criticism ===
Lewis biographer Schorer notes, "The forces of social good and enlightenment as presented in Elmer Gantry are not strong enough to offer any real resistance to the forces of social evil and banality." Schorer concludes, in view of Lewis' research, that the novel satirically represents the religious activity of America in evangelistic circles and the attitudes of the 1920s toward it. Blake argued that the novel suffers greatly because Lewis wrote it under Birkhead's guidance, as he never came into contact with the fundamentalist ministers he intended to satirize. The portion of the novel written when Birkhead was not present is generally considered its most unrealistic.

== Adaptations ==
As of November 2007, there have been five adaptations of the novel:

- A Broadway play by Patrick Kearney opened on August 7, 1928 at the Playhouse Theatre, where it ran for 48 performances; the cast included Edward J. Pawley (later of Big Town fame) as Elmer Gantry, and Vera Allen as Sister Sharon Falconer.
- Director-screenwriter Richard Brooks' 1960 Elmer Gantry starred, among others, Burt Lancaster as Gantry, Shirley Jones as Lulu Bains, and Jean Simmons as Sister Sharon Falconer, and won Brooks the Academy Award for Best Adapted Screenplay, and Best Actor and Best Supporting Actress for Lancaster and Jones, respectively.
- A 1970 Broadway musical adaptation, titled Gantry, opened and closed on the same night, February 14, 1970.
- A 1998 play adaptation by Richard Rossi was performed in Los Angeles and broadcast on TV October 24, 1998.
- In November 2007, an opera, also titled Elmer Gantry, by Robert Aldridge and Herschel Garfein, premiered in the James K. Polk Theater in Nashville, Tennessee.

== Related inspired works ==
Shortly after the publication of Elmer Gantry, H. G. Wells published a widely syndicated newspaper article titled "The New American People", in which he largely bases his observations of American culture on Lewis's novels, including Elmer Gantry.

After the 1998 TV play written by and starring Richard Rossi as Gantry, Rossi was cast in the lead role of Elmer Gantry in a film remake of the 1960 Academy Award-winning film of the same name, slated to be directed by Amin Q. Chaudhri. Chaudhri sought investors for an initial $20 million budget, but after Chaudhri's death on May 10, 2005, Rossi then began writing his own story of an Elmer Gantry-ish evangelist in a contemporary setting, which became the film Canaan Land.
