= The Innocents (novel) =

1917 novel by Sinclair Lewis

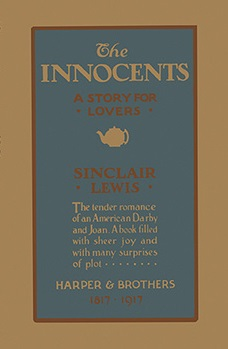
- First edition
- Author: Sinclair Lewis
- Illustrator: Frontispiece by Worth Bretom
- Language: English
- Publisher: Harper & Brothers
- Publication date: 1917
- Publication place: United States
- Media type: Hardcover

The Innocents: A Story for Lovers is a 1917 novel by Sinclair Lewis.
