= Our Mr. Wrenn =

1914 novel by Sinclair Lewis

- First edition
- Author: Sinclair Lewis
- Illustrator: Sinclair Lewis
- Cover artist: Unknown (also frontispiece)
- Language: English
- Publisher: Harper & Brothers
- Publication date: 1914
- Publication place: United States
- Media type: Hardcover
- Pages: 254
- Text: Our Mr. Wrenn at Wikisource

Our Mr. Wrenn: The Romantic Adventures of a Gentle Man is a 1914 novel by Sinclair Lewis and the first to be published under his real name.

== Plot ==
The titular Mr. Wrenn, an unambitious and unassuming employee of a novelty toy company, quits his job after inheriting a fortune from his late father and decides to spend his newfound wealth traveling the world.

== Reception ==
The book sold nine thousand copies.

The book did not get major reviews but most of the reviews said it was a fresh first novel with a different slant. The New York Times said "This rather whimsical story is well off the usual line of fiction in its conception and especially in its leading character." and compared it to Charles Dickens. The Nation said that it was "a story of the ordinary, with an individuality which atones for a certain slowness in pace" and predicted "more telling works in the future." The American Review of Reviews said "The tired business man will find just the right antidote for weariness in 'Our Mr. Wrenn'." Boston Transcript said "A respectful consideration of the claims of plot and construction might be suggested as not out of place even when a person is making his first book 'a labor of love' as his publishers announce he is here doing." Outlook said "Constructively the story is unsatisfactory, but it certainly arouses attention--and exception also."

The book was reprinted after Sinclair Lewis gained popularity in later years.
