= The Trail of the Hawk =

1915 novel by Sinclair Lewis

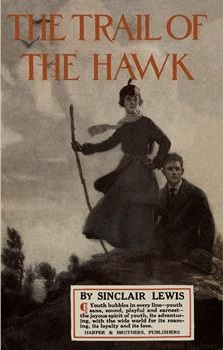
- First edition
- Author: Sinclair Lewis
- Illustrator: Frontispiece by Norman P. Rockwell
- Cover artist: Norman P. Rockwell
- Language: English
- Publisher: Harper & Brothers
- Publication date: 1915
- Publication place: United States
- Media type: Hardcover
- Text: The Trail of the Hawk at Wikisource

The Trail of the Hawk: A Comedy of the Seriousness of Life is a 1915 novel by Sinclair Lewis.

== Plot ==
The story follows the life of Carl Ericson as he grows up and matures. He has to face the choice of either going to his town college, to a private school with a childhood friend, or live in the wilderness with his older friend, who had a cottage in the middle of the forest.
