= Lewis Browne =

American novelist

Lewis Browne (1897 – January 3, 1949) was a writer, philosopher, lecturer and world traveller. A rabbi, Browne turned to writing popular histories and biographies including This Believing World (1926), The Graphic Bible (1928, illustrations by Mark Rothko), and The Wisdom of Israel (1945). His 1943 novel See What I Mean? was regarded as a counterpart to It Can't Happen Here by Sinclair Lewis, Browne's frequent debate partner on the 1940s lecture circuit. Browne was considered one of the foremost authorities on the problems of comparative religion.

== Life and career ==
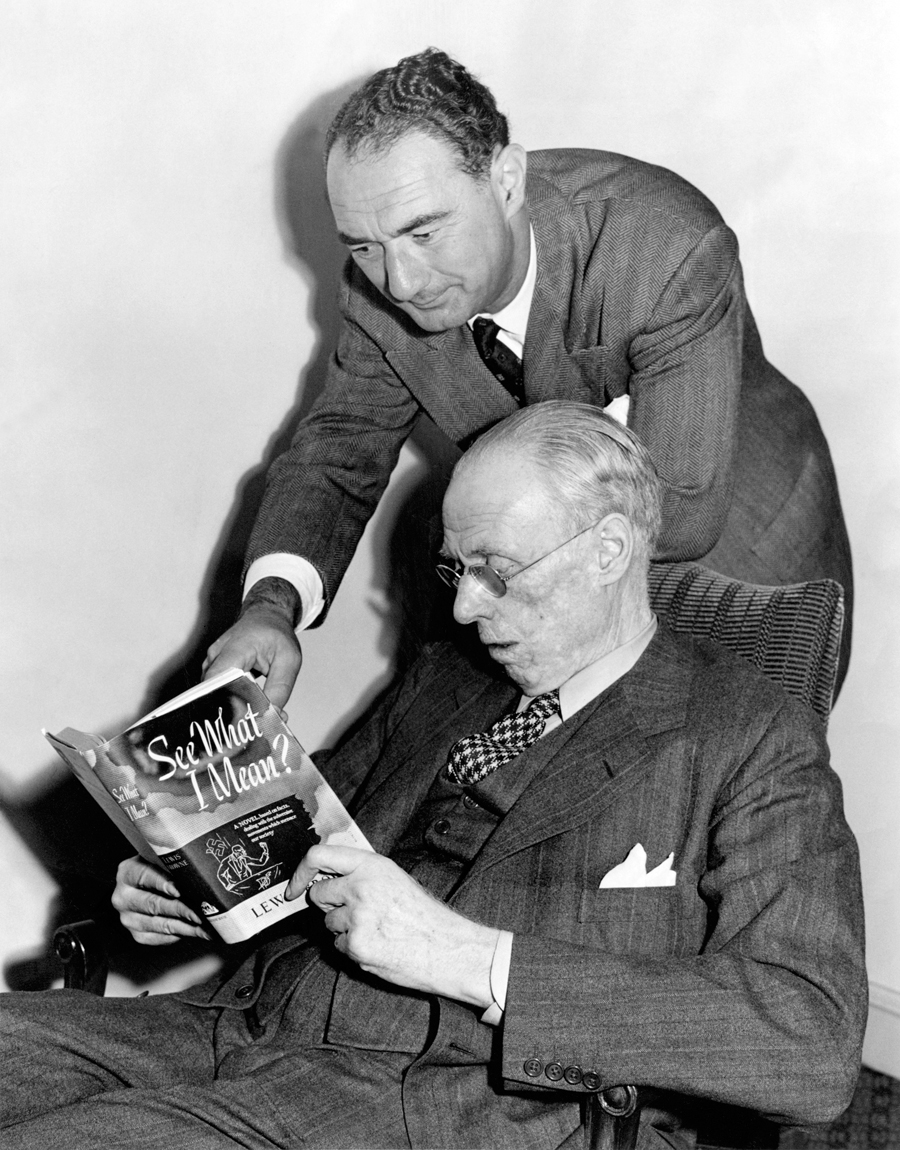
Sinclair Lewis examines Lewis Browne's new novel as they begin their 1943 lecture tour

Browne was born in London, England, in 1897. In 1912 his family emigrated to the United States via the Canadian Pacific Railway from Banff and settled in Portland, Oregon.

Browne received a Bachelor of Arts degree from the University of Cincinnati in 1919, and a bachelor of Hebrew degree from Hebrew Union College in 1920. Rabbi Stephen Samuel Wise ordained Browne rabbi of Temple Israel in Waterbury, Connecticut. Browne's first book, Stranger Than Fiction, was a one-volume history of the Jews published in 1925. His second book, This Believing World (1926), was a survey of world religions that received an honorable mention from AIGA for its design and became the most popular book on religions in American libraries. Its success made Browne one of the foremost humanists of the day, and an interesting speaker known for his philosophical turn of mind and warm sense of humor.

Browne left the rabbinate in April 1926 to concentrate on writing, and spent much of the year in Russia, studying the effect of Soviet rule on the practice of religion. In the U.S., he labored in lumber camps and steel mills, and travelled with migrant workers.

His third book, The Graphic Bible (1928), was first serialized in newspapers throughout the U.S. before it was released as a limited-edition book. Browne commissioned Marcus Rothkowitz—who later shortened his name to Mark Rothko—to illustrate the book, intended for young readers. Rothko's bitter experience with The Graphic Bible led him to sue Browne and his publisher; the lawsuit was unsuccessful.

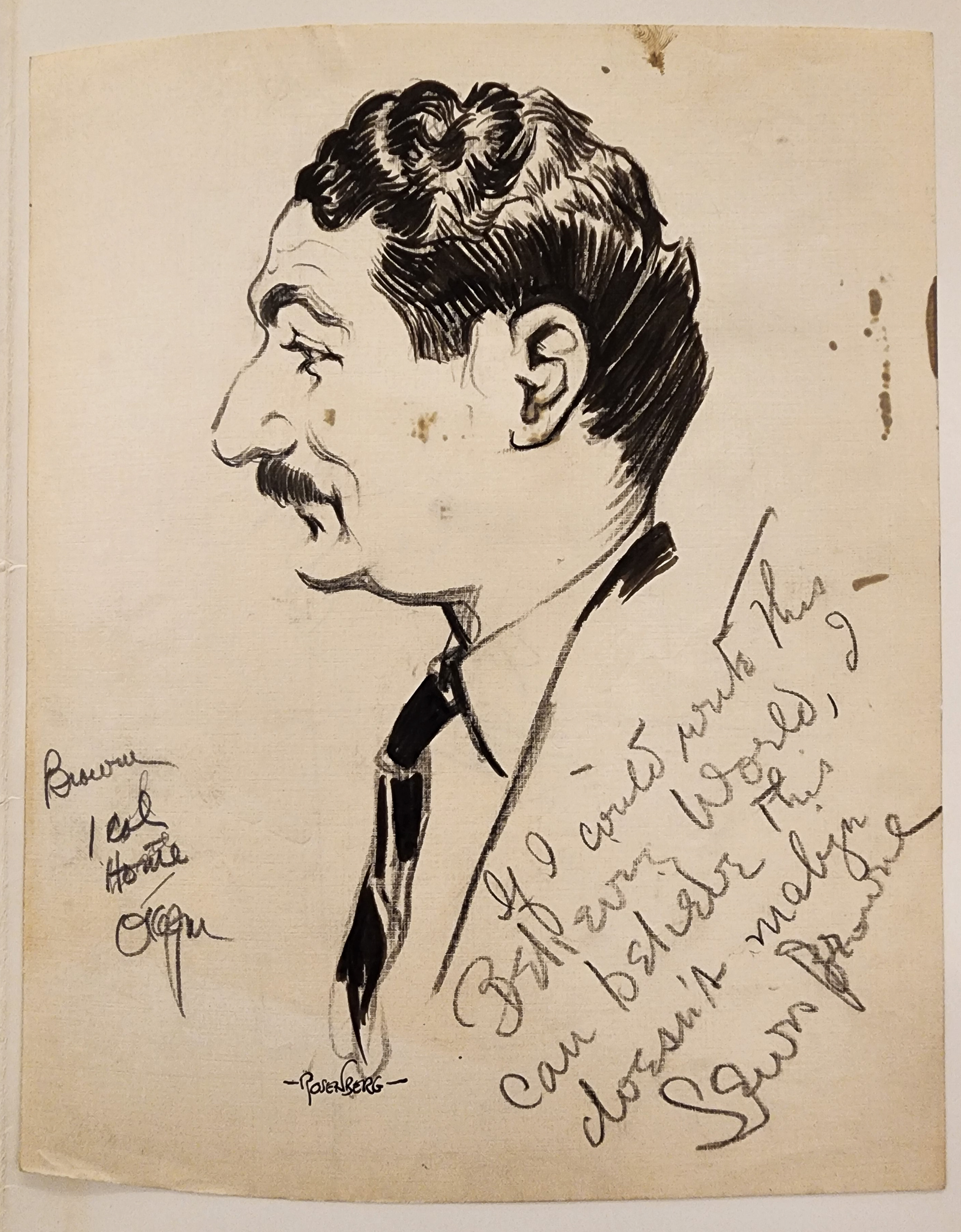
Signed drawing of Lewis Browne by Manuel Rosenberg for the Cincinnati Post 1926

As well as his many books, Browne wrote for The Nation, The New Republic, and other magazines.

Browne was married to Myna Lissner of Los Angeles, California in 1930; the marriage was dissolved in 1941.

By 1941 Browne was ranked among America's most popular lecturers. In the 1940s he toured nationwide with author Sinclair Lewis, debating such questions as "Has the Modern Woman Made Good?", "The Country Versus the City" and "Can Fascism Happen Here?" before audiences of as many as 3,000 people. The pair was described as "the Gallagher and Shean of the lecture circuit" by Sinclair Lewis biographer Richard Lingeman.

Because of their frequent appearances together, Browne's anti-fascist 1943 novel See What I Mean? drew comparison to Lewis's It Can't Happen Here (1935).

Browne died January 3, 1949, at his home in Santa Monica, California, at age 51. His death was ruled an apparent suicide by poison.

Browne's papers were purchased by the Lilly Library in 1969.

== Books ==
- 1925: Stranger Than Fiction: A Short History of the Jews from Earliest Times to the Present Day. New York: Macmillan, 1925.
- 1926: This Believing World: A Simple Account of the Great Religions of Mankind. New York: Macmillan, 1926.
- 1928: The Graphic Bible from Genesis to Revelation in Animated Maps & Charts. New York: Macmillan, 1928.
- 1929: That Man Heine: A Biography by Lewis Browne, with the Collaboration of Elsa Weihl. New York: Macmillan, 1929.
- 1930: The Story of the Jews: From the Earliest Times to the Present Day with Maps and Chronological Tables. New York: Macmillan, 1930.
- 1931: Since Calvary: An Interpretation of Christian History. New York: Macmillan, 1931.
- 1932: Blesséd Spinoza; A Biography of the Philosopher. New York: Macmillan, 1932.
- 1934: How Odd of God; An Introduction to the Jews. New York: Macmillan, 1934.
- 1935: All Things Are Possible: An Apocryphal Novel. New York: Macmillan, 1935.
- 1937: Oh, Say, Can You See!: A Novel. New York: Macmillan, 1937.
- 1942: Something Went Wrong; A Summation of Modern History. New York: Macmillan, 1942.
- 1943: See What I Mean? New York: Random House, 1943.
- 1945: The Wisdom of Israel: An Anthology. New York: Random House, 1945. One of the AIGA Fifty Books of the Year; design by Stefan Salter.
- 1946: The World's Great Scriptures; An Anthology of the Sacred Books of the Ten Principal Religions. New York: Macmillan, 1946.
