= Gideon Planish =

1943 novel by Sinclair Lewis

- Title page for Gideon Planish (1943)
- Author: Sinclair Lewis
- Language: English
- Publisher: Random House
- Publication date: 1943
- Pages: 237

Gideon Planish is a 1943 novel by American writer Sinclair Lewis. The novel tells the story of Gideon Planish, an unprincipled social climber who becomes involved in various shady philanthropic organizations in his quest for stature without accountability. The work did not fare as well with critics as some of Lewis' earlier social novels and is considered one of his minor works.

== Plot summary ==
Gideon Planish takes aim at less-than-honorable fundraising organizations. In a similar manner of his other works, the reader follows the self-titled character through his life and numerous (but slightly related) professions dealing with professional "organizationality" which is better known as the for-profit industry of pompous fundraising run by shady "philanthropists" running a wide variety of guilds, committees, foundations, leagues and councils for selfish and greedy purposes.

The focus of the book begins with a young Planish demonstrating a knack for public speaking, and these skills follow him through his self-motivated and selfish undergraduate years at Adelbert College. The book then picks up an older but still vacuous Planish, now a professor of rhetoric at Kinnikinick College, when he finally meets the woman of his dreams; young student Peony Jackson of Faribault, Minnesota.

Motivated by vague dreams of importance, including a dream of becoming a U.S. senator, Planish begins his campaign for social ascension by moving from one job to another with the hopes of meeting "like-minded thinkers" with vague goals and even more flexible morals when it came to raising money for a wide variety of causes. Over the years, Planish's path to easy money with no accountability leads him to:

- Dean of Kinnikinick College where he begins to use this role as a springboard of notoriety by banishing books (Garfield County Censorship Board) and join do-nothing boards (including the Sympathizers with the Pacifistic Purposes of the New Democratic Turkey) to get his name out in the marketplace of opportunity.
- Editor of the publication Rural Adult Education.
- Itinerant lecturer (between jobs) reusing his inventory of high style/low content messages.
- Managing secretary of the Heskett Rural School Foundation.
- Administration of the Association to Promote Eskimo Culture.
- Ghostwriter of the autobiography of William T. Knife, creator of Okey-Dokey, a beverage juiced with maximum caffeine for the masses.
- Assistant general manager of the Citizens' Conference on Constitutional Crises in the Commonwealth.
- Director general of the Every Man a Priest Fraternity office.
- Directive secretary of the Dynamos of Democratic Direction.

At 50 years old, when fatigued with the never-ending demands of generating self-importance combined with his realization that he lacked substance and true gravitas, Planish has an opportunity to return to Kinnikinick College as its next president and allow him to finally begin to achieve something valid. Through a series of realizations by both himself and Peony, he remains in New York and daily regrets their decision.

== Writing ==
While researching and writing the novel from 1941 to 1943, Lewis frequently visited and consulted with Leon Milton Birkhead, director of the pro-democracy propaganda group Friends of Democracy, a group akin to those Lewis satirized. Lewis had previously consulted and collaborated extensively with Birkhead while writing his popular 1927 critique of religion Elmer Gantry, as Birkhead was then a Unitarian minister.

== Reception ==
William DuBois of The New York Times wrote that Lewis had "nailed his pelts on the barn door with a fine disregard for pattern, the jackal overlapping the mink, the Midwestern skunk cheek by jowl with the Park Avenue ermine" in the novel and that it was "a pleasure to applaud his return to the ring — to report that he is back in fighting trim, and swinging from the floor. The Kansas City Star wrote that while the novel was "certainly not Mr. Lewis's best", it was "even more certainly not his worst" and that with the novel, Lewis was "much more nearly back in the stride that made him one of the world's leading novelists." Joy Barnett of The Atlanta Constitution wrote that Lewis's "caustic comments on every phase of live are, as usual, stimulating" and that his "sharp perception and excellent style will undoubtedly make this book rank high among his other successes."
