= Babbitt (novel) =

Novel by Sinclair Lewis

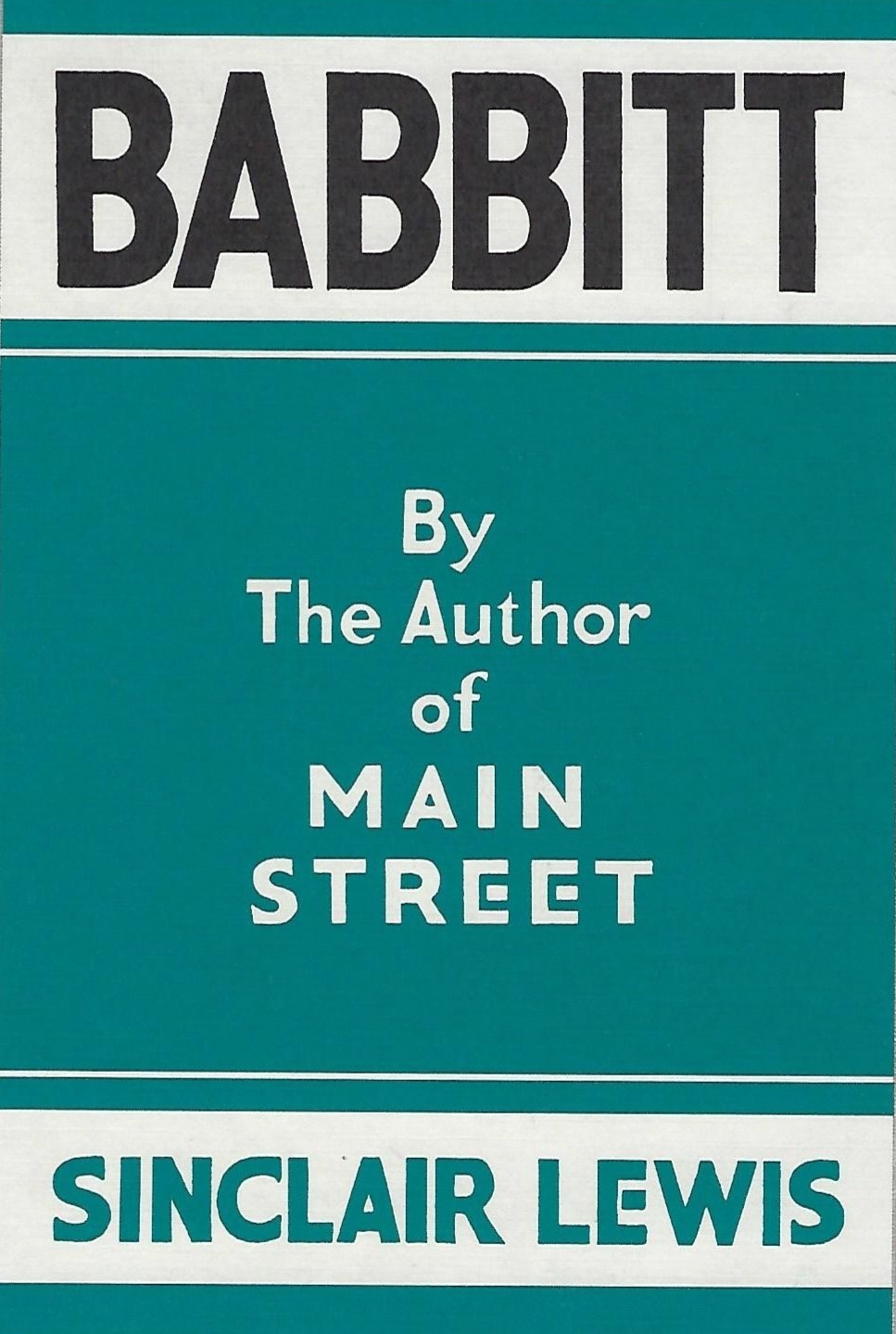
- First edition cover
- Author: Sinclair Lewis
- Language: English
- Subject: American values
- Genre: Satire
- Publisher: Harcourt, Brace & Co.
- Publication date: 1922
- Publication place: United States
- Media type: Print (hardcover)
- Pages: 432 (paperback)
- Preceded by: Main Street
- Followed by: Arrowsmith
- Text: Babbitt at Wikisource

Babbitt (1922), by Sinclair Lewis, is a satirical novel about American culture and society that critiques the vacuity of middle class life and the social pressure toward conformity. The controversy provoked by Babbitt was influential in the decision to award the Nobel Prize in Literature to Lewis in 1930. The novel has been filmed twice, once as a silent in 1924 and remade as a talkie in 1934.

The word Babbitt has entered the English language as a "person and especially a business or professional man who conforms unthinkingly to prevailing middle-class standards".

== Plot ==
The Smart Set's review of the novel stated, "There is no plot whatever... Babbitt simply grows two years older as the tale unfolds."

The first seven chapters follow the paunchy, clumsy George F. Babbitt's life over the course of a single day. Over breakfast, Babbitt, a successful real estate broker in his late forties, dotes on his ten-year-old daughter Tinka, tries to dissuade his 22-year-old daughter Verona from her newfound socialist leanings, and encourages his 17-year-old son Ted to try harder in school.

At the office he dictates letters and discusses real estate advertising with his employees; he also engages in corrupt business deals while hypocritically condemning others who behave similarly. In the same vein, he and his wife unsuccessfully try to social-climb with more prestigious college classmates of his, while meanly snubbing those whom Babbitt considers beneath himself. He socializes with similarly shallow, and often racist, people at the Zenith Athletic Club and private parties, which often include illegal alcohol.

Babbitt also ruminates on his college days, when he had plans to be a social reformer and lawyer, and often fantasizes about finding a "fairy girl" to counterbalance his dull wife and life. Gradually, Babbitt realizes his dissatisfaction with "The American Dream", and attempts to quell these feelings by going camping in Maine with his close friend and old college roommate, the artistic, violin-playing Paul Riesling. Although the trip has its ups and downs, the two men consider it an overall success and leave feeling optimistic about the year ahead.

On the day Babbitt gets elected vice-president of the Boosters club, he finds out that Paul shot his abrasive wife Zilla, who partially recovers but turns into a vengeful religious fanatic. Babbitt immediately drives to the jail where Paul is being held, trying to think of ways to help Paul out. Shortly after Paul's arrest, Babbitt's wife and daughter go to visit relatives, leaving Babbitt more or less on his own. Babbitt begins to ask himself what it was he really wanted in life.

In time, Babbitt begins to rebel against all of the standards he formerly held: he jumps into liberal politics with famous socialist/"single tax" litigator Seneca Doane; flirts unsuccessfully with his attractive secretary Theresa McGoun (who leaves to work elsewhere), manicure girl Ida Putiak, and his friend Eddie Swanson's charming wife Louetta; conducts an extramarital affair with sophisticated widow Tanis Judique; goes on various vacations; and cavorts around Zenith with Tanis' friends, who are bohemians and flappers. He slowly becomes aware that his forays into nonconformity are not only futile but also destructive of the life and the friends he once loved, or at least followed.

When Babbitt's wife falls ill with acute appendicitis, Babbitt dotes on her and relinquishes all rebellion. During her long recovery, they rekindle their intimacy, such as it is, and Babbitt reverts to conformity, attending his pro-business Presbyterian church more often and joining a violently anti-union group of businessmen. Verona marries a Kenneth Escott, who has similar ideas to hers. In the final scene, Babbitt discovers that his son Ted has secretly married Eunice Littlefield, the rebellious daughter of his neighbor. Although most of both families disapprove, Babbitt privately offers Ted his approval of the marriage, stating that though he does not agree, he admires Ted for living his life on his own terms, as Ted's father has not.

== Setting ==
Zenith is a fictitious city in the equally fictitious Midwestern state of "Winnemac", adjacent to Ohio, Indiana, Illinois, and Michigan. (Babbitt does not mention Winnemac by name, but Lewis's subsequent novel Arrowsmith elaborates on its location.) When Babbitt was published, newspapers in Cincinnati, Duluth, Kansas City, Milwaukee, and Minneapolis each claimed that their city was the model for Zenith. Cincinnati had perhaps the strongest claim, as Lewis had lived there while researching the book. Lewis's own correspondence suggests, however, that Zenith is meant to be any Midwestern city with a population between about 200,000 and 300,000.

Lewis was highly critical of the similarities among most American cities, especially when compared to the diverse—and in his view, culturally richer—cities of Europe. Frowning on the interchangeable qualities of American cities, he wrote: "it would not be possible to write a novel which would in every line be equally true to Munich and Florence."

While conducting research for Babbitt, Lewis kept detailed journals, in which he drafted long biographies for each of his characters. For his title character this biography even included a detailed genealogy, as well as a list of Babbitt's college courses. Zenith's major names and families are documented in these journals, and many of them emerge again in Lewis's later writings. Zenith's layout is also imagined in careful detail. Lewis drew a series of 18 maps of Zenith and outlying areas, including Babbitt's house, with all its furnishings.

== Themes ==
=== Business and the middle class ===
After the social instability and sharp economic depression that followed World War I, many Americans in the 1920s saw business and city growth as foundations for stability. The civic boosters and self-made men of the middle-class represented particularly American depictions of success, at a time when the promotion of the American identity was crucial in the face of rising fears of Communism. At the same time, growing Midwestern cities, usually associated with mass production and the emergence of a consumer society, were also seen as emblems of American progress. George F. Babbitt, the novel's main character, was described by the 1930 Nobel Prize committee as "the ideal of an American popular hero of the middle-class. The relativity of business morals as well as private rules of conduct is for him an accepted article of faith, and without hesitation he considers it God's purpose that man should work, increase his income, and enjoy modern improvements."

To his publisher, Lewis wrote: “[George Babbitt] is all of us Americans at 46, prosperous, but worried, wanting — passionately — to seize something more than motor cars and a house before it's too late.” About the novel, Lewis said: “This is the story of the ruler of America” wherein the “tired American Businessman” wielded socioeconomic power not through his exceptionality but rather through militant conformity. Lewis portrayed the American businessman as a man deeply dissatisfied with and privately aware of his shortcomings; he is “the most grievous victim of his own militant dullness” who secretly longed for freedom and romance. Readers who praised the psychological realism of the portrait admitted to regularly encountering Babbitts in real life but also could relate to some of the character's anxieties about conformity and personal fulfillment. Published two years after Lewis's previous novel (Main Street, 1920), the story of George F. Babbitt was much anticipated because each novel presented a portrait of American society wherein “the principal character is brought into conflict with the accepted order of things, sufficiently to illustrate its ruthlessness.”

=== Social change ===
Although many other popular novelists writing at the time of Babbitt's publication depict the "Roaring Twenties" as an era of social change and disillusionment with material culture, modern scholars argue that Lewis was not himself a member of the "Lost Generation" of younger writers like Ernest Hemingway or F. Scott Fitzgerald. Instead, he was influenced by the Progressive Era; and changes in the American identity that accompanied the country's rapid urbanization, technological growth, industrialization, and the closing of the frontier. Although the Progressive Era had built a protective barrier around the upstanding American businessman, one literary scholar wrote that "Lewis was fortunate enough to come on the scene just as the emperor's clothes were disappearing." Lewis has been compared to many authors, writing before and after the publication of Babbitt, who made similar criticisms of the middle class. Although it was published in 1899, long before Babbitt, Thorstein Veblen's The Theory of the Leisure Class, which critiqued consumer culture and social competition at the turn of the 20th century, is an oft-cited point of comparison. Written decades later, in 1950, David Riesman's The Lonely Crowd has also been compared to Lewis's writings.

== Critical reception ==
The social critic and satirist H. L. Mencken, an ardent supporter of Sinclair Lewis, called himself “an old professor of Babbitry” and said that Babbitt was a stunning work of literary realism about American society. To Mencken, George F. Babbitt was an archetype of the American city dwellers who touted the virtues of Republicanism, Presbyterianism, and absolute conformity because "it is not what he [Babbitt] feels and aspires that moves him primarily; it is what the folks about him will think of him. His politics is communal politics, mob politics, herd politics; his religion is a public rite wholly without subjective significance." Mencken said that Babbitt was the literary embodiment of everything wrong with American society. In the cultural climate of the early 20th century, like-minded critics and Mencken's followers were known as "Babbitt-baiters".

Despite Mencken's praise of Babbitt as unflinching social satire, other critics found exaggeration in Lewis's depiction of the American businessman. In the book review “From Maupassant to Mencken” (1922), Edmund Wilson compared Lewis's style in Babbitt to the more “graceful” writing styles of satirists such as Charles Dickens and Mark Twain and said that, as a prose stylist, Lewis's literary “gift is almost entirely for making people nasty” and the characters unbelievable. Concurring with Wilson that Lewis was no Twain, another critic dismissed Babbitt as “a monstrous, bawling, unconscionable satire” and said “Mr. Lewis is the most phenomenally skillful exaggerator in literature today.” Nonetheless, in its first year of publication, 140,997 copies of the novel were sold in the U.S. In the mid-1920s, Babbitt-baiting became an irritant to American businessmen, Rotarians, and the like, who began defending the Babbitts of the U.S. by way of radio and magazine journalism. They emphasized the virtues of community organizations and the positive contributions that industrial cities have made to American society.

== Adaptations ==
Babbitt has been converted into films twice, a feat that David Sterritt of Turner Classic Movies describes as "impressive for a novel that barely has a plot." The first adaptation was a silent film released in 1924 and starring Willard Louis as George F. Babbitt. According to Warner Bros. records, that version cost $123,000 and made $278,000 from domestic rentals and $28,000 from foreign rentals for a total box office of $306,000.

The second was a 1934 talkie starring Guy Kibbee. That version, while remaining somewhat true to Lewis's novel, takes liberties with the plot, exaggerating Babbitt's affair and a sour real estate deal. Both films were Warner Bros. productions.

A production of Babbitt in 1987 was the premiere audio play by L.A. Theatre Works.

In November 2023, the La Jolla Playhouse premiered a play adaptation by Joe DiPietro of Babbitt starring Matthew Broderick as part of their 2023-2024 Season. The Shakespeare Theatre Company in Washington, DC, opened the play in October 2024.

== Cultural influence ==
In American literature and popular culture, the character and behaviors of George F. Babbitt became established as negative archetypes of person and personality; a Babbitt is “a materialistic and complacent businessman conforming to the standards of his [social] set” and Babbittry is the “Philistine behaviour of a Babbitt”. Examples include C. E. M. Joad's 1927 book The Babbitt Warren, a scathing critique of American society, and Vachel Lindsay's 1922 poem "The Babbitt Jambouree." Elizabeth Stevenson referenced the character in the title of her popular history of the 1920s, Babbitts and Bohemians: From the Great War to the Great Depression.

Bilbo Baggins, the main character in J. R. R. Tolkien's novel The Hobbit was partly inspired by Babbitt, as was the title of the book itself. Bilbo and hobbits in general are known for being most comfortable at home, uninterested in adventure, and primarily concerned with the accumulation of food and possessions. Other fictional influences are found in Aldous Huxley's Eyeless in Gaza and Saul Bellow's Humboldt's Gift. In both novels, one character compares another character to George Babbitt, contrasting their aspirational qualities with their ultimate complacency. The novel is one of the inspirations of the novel Rabbit, Run (the protagonist of which is also a complacent and unfulfilled businessman) and its sequels by John Updike.

== See also ==
- Service club, Rotary International
- Boosterism, Booster Club
- Winesburg, Ohio
