= The Job (novel) =

1917 novel by Sinclair Lewis

- First edition
- Author: Sinclair Lewis
- Language: English
- Publisher: Harper & Brothers
- Publication date: 1917
- Publication place: United States
- Pages: 326 pp.
- OCLC: 29478586

The Job is an early work by American novelist Sinclair Lewis, considered an early declaration of the rights of working women. The focus is on the main character, Una Golden, and her desire to establish herself in a legitimate occupation while balancing the eventual need for marriage. The story takes place between the early 1900s and the 1920s. Una moves from the small Pennsylvania town of her youth to New York to pursue an education, but leaves school and enters the workforce when her family can no longer afford to pay tuition.

Initially taking a secretarial job, Una shows a talent for the traditionally male field of commercial real estate and becomes the first female realtor employed by her firm. In parallel, her quest for romance and love is important, but her unusual role as a working woman doing a man's job makes it difficult to find an appropriate suitor.

Una is on track to marry Walter Babson, who appears to be a good man but lacks the excitement of her eventual husband, Edward Schwirtz. Schwirtz is a charming salesman who wins her heart, but the marriage is troubled from the start. Una eventually decides to divorce him, which was considered scandalous at the time. By the end of the book, Una has succeeded in both her career and her personal life.

The novel was published before Lewis achieved significant fame. It provides insight into the lives of working women, and having a woman as the lead character was unusual for the time.
