= Sinclair Lewis =

American writer (1885–1951)

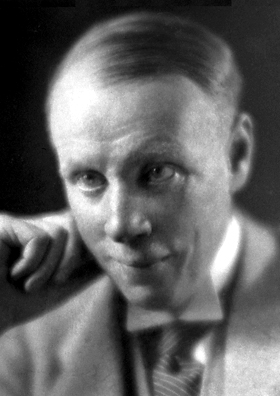
- Lewis in 1930
- Born: Harry Sinclair Lewis; February 7, 1885; Sauk Centre, Minnesota, U.S.
- Died: January 10, 1951 (aged 65); Rome, Italy
- Education: Yale University (BA)
- Occupations: Novelist; short-story writer; playwright
- Spouses: Grace Livingston Hegger (m. 1914; div. 1928); Dorothy Thompson (m. 1928; div. 1942)
- Children: 2
- Writing career
- Notable works: Main Street (1920); Babbitt (1922); Arrowsmith (1925); Elmer Gantry (1927); Dodsworth (1929); It Can't Happen Here (1935)
- Notable awards: Nobel Prize in Literature (1930)

Harry Sinclair Lewis (February 7, 1885 – January 10, 1951) was an American novelist, short-story writer, and playwright. In 1930, he became the first author from the United States (and the first from the Americas) to receive the Nobel Prize in Literature, which was awarded "for his vigorous and graphic art of description and his ability to create, with wit and humor, new types of characters." Lewis wrote six popular novels: Main Street (1920), Babbitt (1922), Arrowsmith (1925), Elmer Gantry (1927), Dodsworth (1929), and It Can't Happen Here (1935).

Several of his notable works were critical of American capitalism and materialism during the interwar period. Lewis is respected for his strong characterizations of modern working women. H. L. Mencken wrote of him, "[If] there was ever a novelist among us with an authentic call to the trade ... it is this red-haired tornado from the Minnesota wilds."

== Early life ==
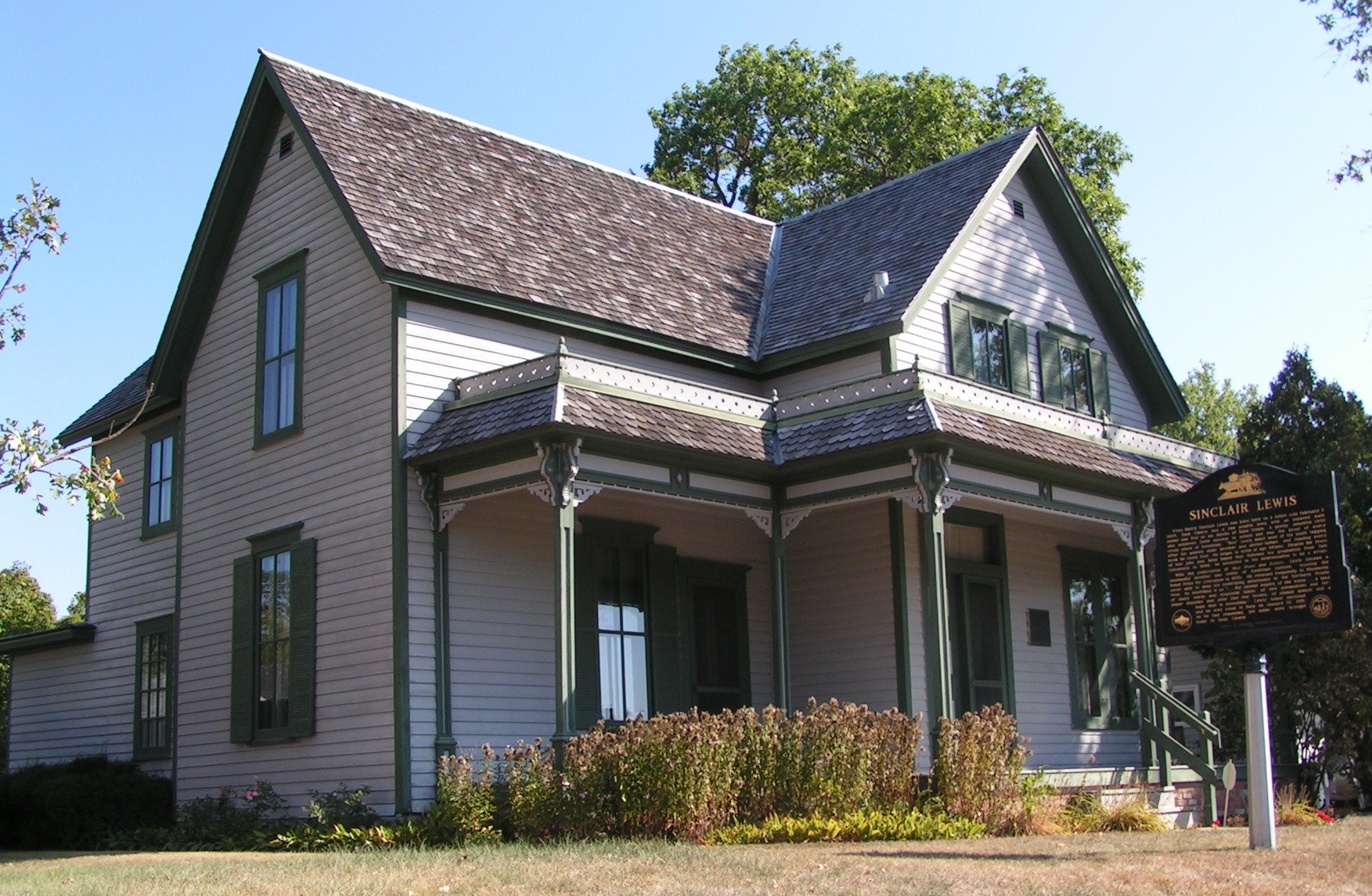
The Sinclair Lewis Boyhood Home museum

Lewis was born February 7, 1885, in the village of Sauk Centre, Minnesota, to Edwin J. Lewis, a physician of Welsh descent, and Emma Kermott Lewis. He had two older siblings, Fred (born 1875) and Claude (born 1878). His father was a stern disciplinarian, who had difficulty relating to his sensitive, unathletic third son. Lewis's mother died in 1891. The next year Edwin married Isabel Warner, whom young Lewis apparently liked. Lewis began reading books while young, and kept a diary. Throughout his lonely boyhood, the ungainly child—tall, extremely thin, stricken with acne and somewhat pop-eyed—had trouble making friends and pined after local girls. At the age of 13, he ran away from home and unsuccessfully tried to become a drummer boy in the Spanish–American War. In late 1902, Lewis left home for a year at Oberlin Academy (the then-preparatory department of Oberlin College) to qualify for acceptance at Yale University. While at Oberlin, he developed a religious enthusiasm that waxed and waned for much of his remaining teenage years. Lewis later became an atheist. He entered Yale in 1903, but did not receive his bachelor's degree until 1908, taking time off to work at Helicon Home Colony, Upton Sinclair's cooperative-living colony in Englewood, New Jersey, and to travel to Panama. Lewis's undistinguished looks, country manners and seeming self-importance made it difficult for him to win and keep friends at Oberlin and Yale. He did make a few friends among the students and professors, some of whom recognized his promise as a writer.

== Career ==
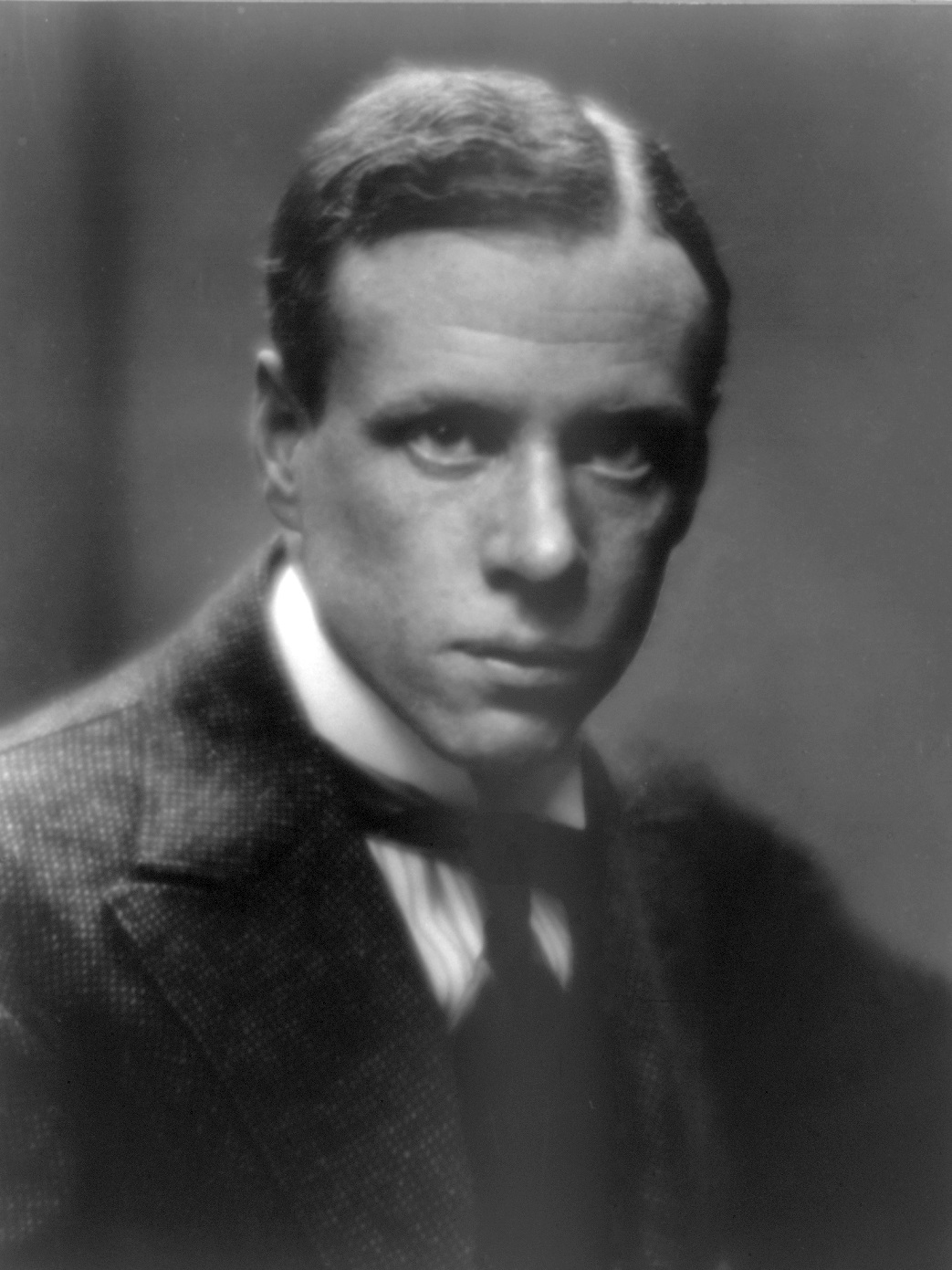
Lewis in 1914

Lewis's earliest published creative work—romantic poetry and short sketches—appeared in the Yale Courant and the Yale Literary Magazine, of which he became an editor. After graduation Lewis moved from job to job and from place to place in an effort to make ends meet, writing fiction for publication and to chase away boredom. In the summer of 1908, Lewis worked as an editorial writer at a newspaper in Waterloo, Iowa. In September of that year, he moved to the Carmel-by-the-Sea writers' colony near Monterey, California to work for the MacGowan sisters and to meet poet George Sterling in person. He left Carmel after six months, moving to San Francisco where Sterling helped him get a job at the San Francisco Evening Bulletin. Lewis returned to Carmel in spring 1910 and met Jack London.

In fall 1910, Lewis moved to New York to work for Frederick A. Stokes. The next year, he joined the New York chapter of the Socialist Party of America. Among his colleagues in the intellectual wing of the party were Walter Lippmann, William English Walling, Ernest Poole, and John Sloan.

While working for newspapers and publishing houses he developed a facility for turning out shallow, popular stories that were purchased by a variety of magazines. He also earned money by selling plots to London, including one for the latter's unfinished novel The Assassination Bureau, Ltd.

Lewis's first published book was Hike and the Aeroplane, a Tom Swift-style potboiler that appeared in 1912 under the pseudonym Tom Graham.

Sinclair Lewis's first serious novel, Our Mr. Wrenn: The Romantic Adventures of a Gentle Man, appeared in 1914, followed by The Trail of the Hawk: A Comedy of the Seriousness of Life (1915) and The Job (1917). That same year also saw the publication of another potboiler, The Innocents: A Story for Lovers, an expanded version of a serial story that had originally appeared in Woman's Home Companion. Free Air, another refurbished serial story, was published in 1919.

=== Commercial success ===
Upon moving to Washington, D.C., Lewis devoted himself to writing. As early as 1916, he began taking notes for a realistic novel about small-town life. Work on that novel continued through mid-1920, when he completed Main Street, which was published on October 23, 1920. His biographer Mark Schorer wrote in 1961 that the phenomenal success of Main Street "was the most sensational event in twentieth-century American publishing history". Lewis's agent had the most optimistic projection of sales at 25,000 copies. In its first six months, Main Street sold 180,000 copies, and within a few years, sales were estimated at two million. Richard Lingeman wrote in 2002, "Main Street made [Lewis] rich—earning him about 3 million current dollars" (almost $5 million, as of 2022).

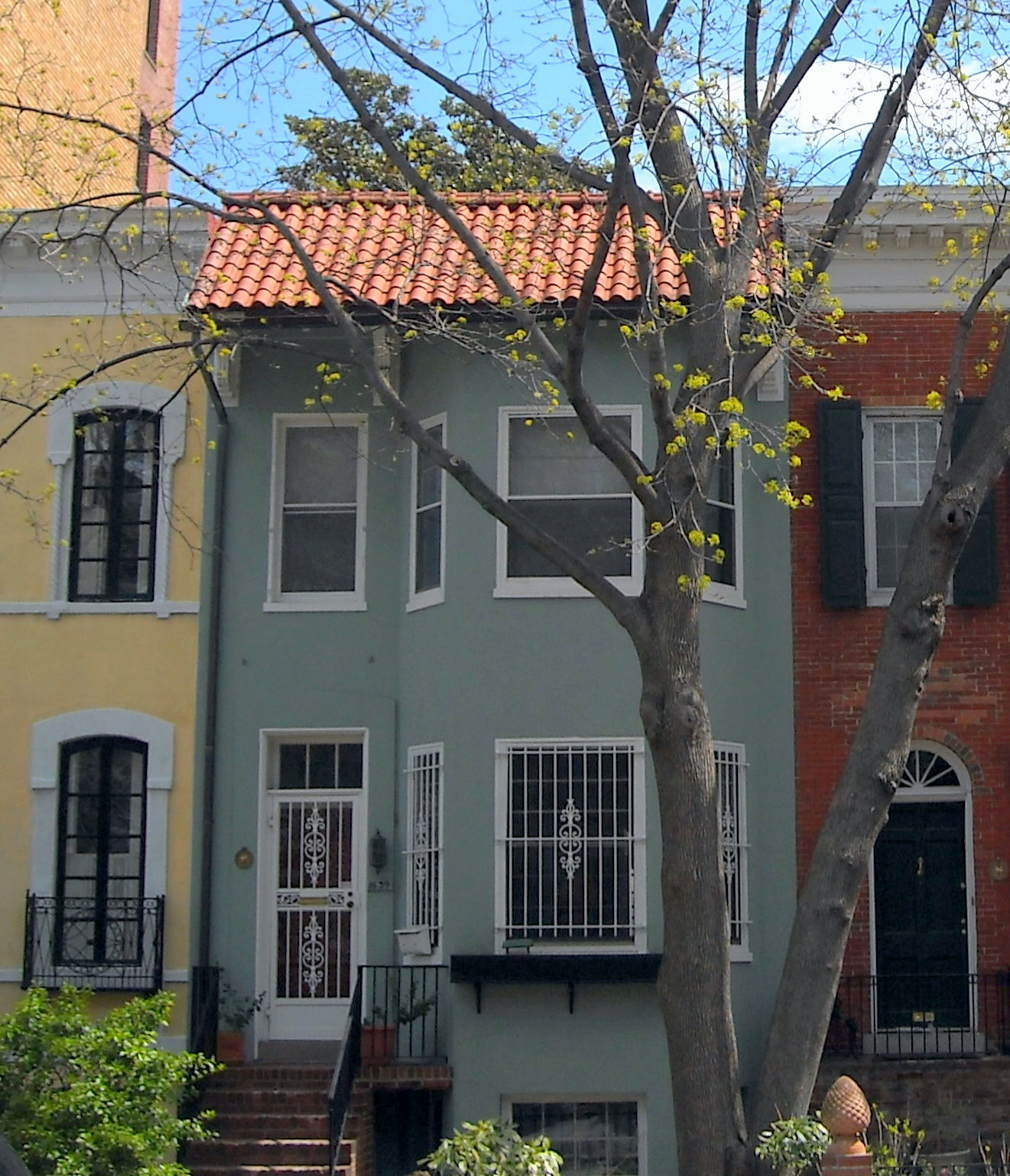
Sinclair Lewis's former residence in Washington, D.C.

Lewis followed up this first great success with Babbitt (1922), a novel that satirized the American commercial culture and boosterism. The story was set in the fictional Midwestern town of Zenith, Winnemac, a setting to which Lewis returned in future novels, including Arrowsmith, Elmer Gantry, Gideon Planish and Dodsworth.

Lewis continued his success in the 1920s with Arrowsmith (1925), a novel about the challenges faced by an idealistic doctor. It was awarded the Pulitzer Prize, which Lewis declined, still upset that Main Street had not won the prize. It was adapted as a 1931 Hollywood film directed by John Ford and starring Ronald Colman which was nominated for four Academy Awards.

Next Lewis published Elmer Gantry (1927), which depicted an evangelical minister as deeply hypocritical. The novel was denounced by many religious leaders and banned in some U.S. cities. It was adapted for the screen more than a generation later as the basis of the 1960 movie starring Burt Lancaster, who earned a Best Actor Oscar for his performance in the title role. The film won two more awards as well.

Lewis next published Dodsworth (1929), a novel about the most affluent and successful members of American society. He portrayed them as leading essentially pointless lives in spite of great wealth and advantages. The book was adapted for the Broadway stage in 1934 by Sidney Howard, who also wrote the screenplay for the 1936 film version directed by William Wyler, which was a great success at the time. The film is still highly regarded; in 1990, it was selected for preservation in the National Film Registry, and in 2005 Time magazine named it one of the "100 Best Movies" of the past 80 years.

During the late 1920s and 1930s, Lewis wrote many short stories for a variety of magazines and publications. "Bongo" (1930) is a tale about a bear cub who wants to escape the circus in search of a better life in the real world, first published in Cosmopolitan magazine. The story was acquired by Walt Disney Pictures in 1940 for a possible feature film. World War II sidetracked those plans until 1947. Disney used the story as part of its feature Fun and Fancy Free.

=== Nobel Prize ===
In 1930 Lewis won the Nobel Prize in Literature, the first writer from the United States to receive the award, after he had been nominated by Henrik Schück, member of the Swedish Academy. In the academy's presentation speech, special attention was paid to Babbitt. In his Nobel Lecture, Lewis praised Theodore Dreiser, Willa Cather, Ernest Hemingway, and other contemporaries, but also lamented that "in America most of us—not readers alone, but even writers—are still afraid of any literature which is not a glorification of everything American, a glorification of our faults as well as our virtues," and that America is "the most contradictory, the most depressing, the most stirring, of any land in the world today." He also offered a profound criticism of the American literary establishment: "Our American professors like their literature clear and cold and pure and very dead."

== Later years ==
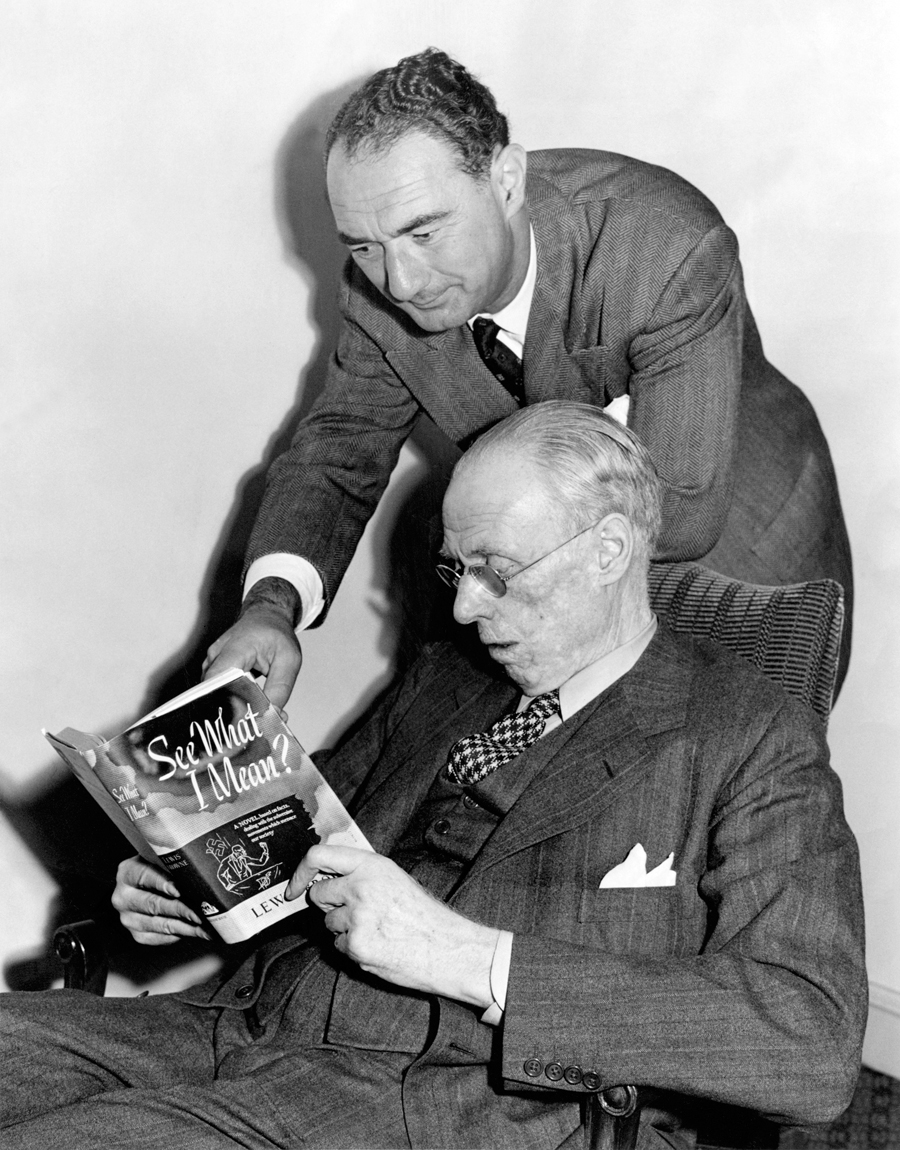
Sinclair Lewis examines Lewis Browne's new novel as they begin their 1943 lecture tour.

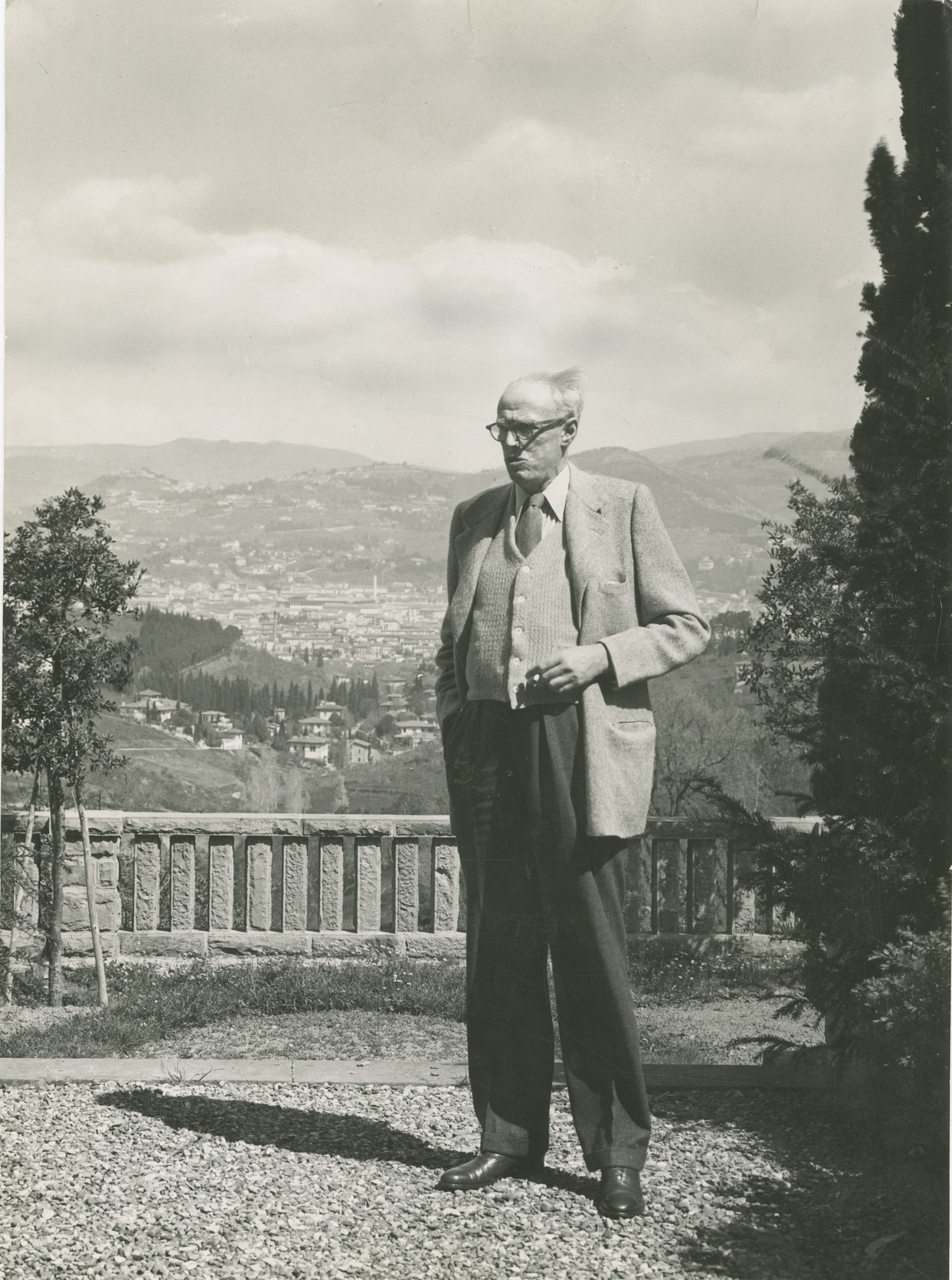
Sinclair Lewis on the terrace of the villa "La Costa" in the San Miniato area in Tuscany

After winning the Nobel Prize, Lewis wrote eleven more novels, ten of which appeared in his lifetime. The best remembered is It Can't Happen Here (1935), a novel about the election of a fascist to the American presidency.

After praising Dreiser as "pioneering", that he "more than any other man, marching alone, usually unappreciated, often hated, has cleared the trail from Victorian and Howellsian timidity and gentility in American fiction to honesty and boldness and passion of life" in his Nobel Lecture in December 1930, in March 1931 Lewis publicly accused Dreiser of plagiarizing a book by Dorothy Thompson, Lewis's wife, which led to a well-publicized fight, wherein Dreiser repeatedly slapped Lewis. Thompson initially made the accusation in 1928 regarding her work "The New Russia" and Dreiser's "Dreiser Goes to Russia", though The New York Times also linked the dispute to competition between Dreiser and Lewis over the Nobel Prize. Dreiser fired back that Sinclair's 1925 novel Arrowsmith (adapted later that year as a feature film) was unoriginal and that Dreiser himself was first approached to write it, which was disputed by the wife of Arrowsmith's subject, microbiologist Dr. Paul de Kruif. The feud carried on for some months. In 1944, Lewis campaigned to have Dreiser recognized by the American Academy of Arts and Letters.

After an alcoholic binge in 1937, Lewis checked in for treatment to the Austen Riggs Center, a psychiatric hospital in Stockbridge, Massachusetts. His doctors gave him a blunt assessment that he needed to decide "whether he was going to live without alcohol or die by it, one or the other." Lewis checked out after ten days, lacking any "fundamental understanding of his problem", as one of his physicians wrote to a colleague.

In the autumn of 1940, Lewis visited his old acquaintance, William Ellery Leonard, in Madison, Wisconsin. Leonard arranged a meeting with the chancellor of the University of Wisconsin–Madison and a tour of the campus. Lewis immediately became enthralled with the university and the city and offered to remain and teach a course in creative writing in the upcoming semester. For a month he was quite enamored of his professorial role. Suddenly, on November 7, after giving only five classes to his select group of 24 students, he announced that he had taught them all that he knew. He left Madison the next day.

In the 1940s, Lewis and rabbi-turned-popular-author Lewis Browne frequently appeared on the lecture platform together, touring the United States and debating before audiences of as many as 3,000 people, addressing such questions as "Has the Modern Woman Made Good?", "The Country Versus the City", "Is the Machine Age Wrecking Civilization?", and "Can Fascism Happen Here?". The pair were described as "the Gallagher and Shean of the lecture circuit" by Lewis biographer Richard Lingeman.

In the early 1940s, Lewis lived in Duluth, Minnesota. During this time, he wrote the novel Kingsblood Royal (1947), set in the fictional city of Grand Republic, Minnesota, an enlarged and updated version of Zenith. It is based on the Sweet Trials in Detroit in which an African-American doctor was denied the chance to purchase a house in a "white" section of the city. Lewis' creation of the novel was preceded by his introduction to the black community via Edward Francis Murphy, a Josephite priest with whom he had attended school as a child. Kingsblood was a powerful and very early contribution to the civil rights movement.

In 1943, Lewis went to Hollywood to work on a script with Dore Schary, who had just resigned as executive head of Metro-Goldwyn-Mayer's low-budget film department to concentrate on writing and producing his own films. The resulting screenplay was Storm In the West, "a traditional American western" — except for the fact that it was also an allegory of World War II, with primary villain Hygatt (Hitler) and his henchmen Gribbles (Goebbels) and Gerrett (Goering) plotting to take over the Franson Ranch, the Poling Ranch, and so on. The screenplay was deemed too political by MGM studio executives and was shelved, and the film was never made. Storm In the West was finally published in 1963, with a foreword by Schary detailing the work's origins, the authors' creative process, and the screenplay's ultimate fate.

Sinclair Lewis had been a frequent visitor to Williamstown, Massachusetts. In 1946, he rented Thorvale Farm on Oblong Road. While working on his novel Kingsblood Royal, he purchased this summer estate and upgraded the Georgian mansion along with a farmhouse and many outbuildings. By 1948, Lewis had created a gentleman's farm consisting of 720 acres (290 ha) of agricultural and forest land. His intended residence in Williamstown was short-lived because of his medical problems.

== Personal life ==
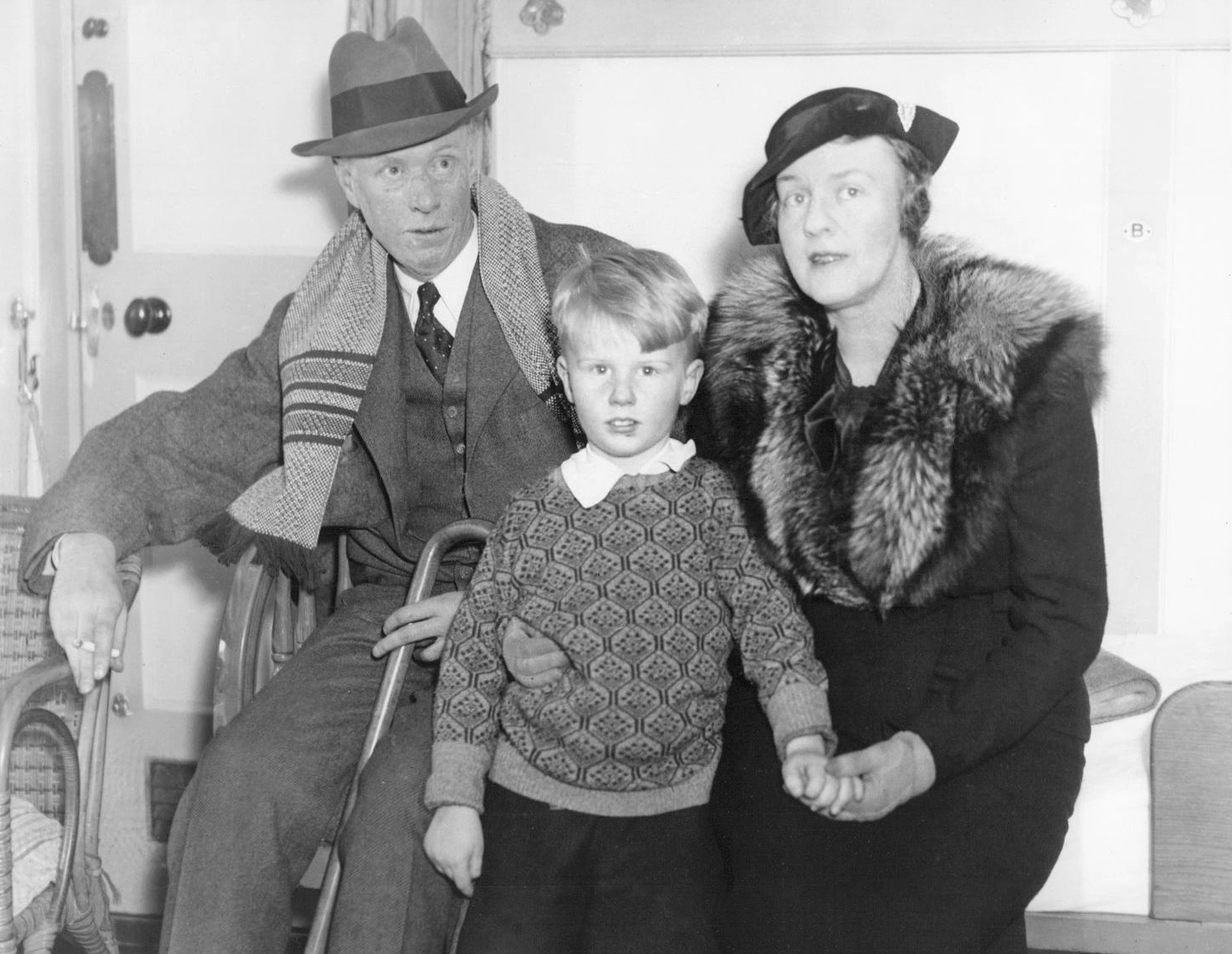
Lewis with Thompson and son in 1935

In 1914 Lewis married Grace Livingston Hegger (1887–1981), an editor at Vogue magazine. They had one son, Wells Lewis (1917–1944). It is commonly claimed, erroneously, that Wells Lewis was named after British author H. G. Wells. However, Hegger denies this in her autobigraphical book With Love From Gracie. ""We named the baby Wells. Not after H.G. Wells, the person, as is generally assumed. We did not know the distinguished English novelist then...."

Serving as a U.S. Army lieutenant during World War II, Wells Lewis was killed in action on October 29, 1944, amid Allied efforts to rescue the "Lost Battalion" in France. Dean Acheson, the future Secretary of State, was a neighbor and family friend in Washington, and observed that Sinclair's literary "success was not good for that marriage, or for either of the parties to it, or for Lewis's work" and the family moved out of town.

Lewis divorced Grace on April 16, 1928. On May 14, he married the noted international correspondent and newspaper columnist Dorothy Thompson. In 1928, he and Dorothy purchased a second home in rural Vermont. They had a son, Michael Lewis (1930–1975), who became a stage actor. Their marriage had virtually ended by 1937, and they divorced in 1942.

Lewis died in Rome from advanced alcoholism, on January 10, 1951, aged 65. His body was cremated and his remains were buried at Greenwood Cemetery in Sauk Centre, Minnesota. His final novel World So Wide (1951) was published posthumously.

William Shirer, a friend and admirer of Lewis, argued that Lewis did not die from alcoholism. He reported that Lewis had a heart attack and that his doctors advised him to stop drinking if he wanted to live. Lewis did not stop, and perhaps could not; he died when his heart stopped.

In summarizing Lewis's career, Shirer said:

It has become rather commonplace for so-called literary critics to write off Sinclair Lewis as a novelist. Compared to ... Fitzgerald, Hemingway, Dos Passos, and Faulkner ... Lewis lacked style. Yet his impact on modern American life ... was greater than all of the other four writers together.

== Legacy ==
Compared to his contemporaries, Lewis's reputation suffered a precipitous decline among literary scholars throughout the 20th century. Despite his enormous popularity during the 1920s, by the 21st century most of his works had been eclipsed in prominence by other writers with less commercial success during the same time period, such as F. Scott Fitzgerald and Ernest Hemingway.

Since the 2010s there has been renewed interest in Lewis's work, in particular his 1935 dystopian satire It Can't Happen Here. In the aftermath of the 2016 United States presidential election, It Can't Happen Here surged to the top of Amazon's list of best-selling books. Scholars have found parallels in his novels to the COVID-19 crisis, and to the rise of Donald Trump.

He has been honored by the U.S. Postal Service with a postage stamp in the Great Americans series. In 1960 Polish American sculptor Joseph Kiselewski was commissioned to create a bust of Lewis, now in the Great River Regional public library in Sauk Centre.

== Works ==
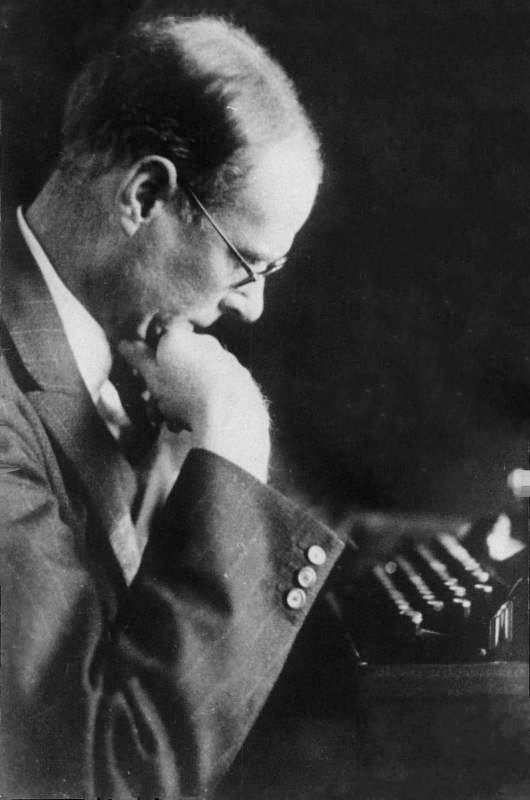
Lewis in 1944

=== Novels ===
- 1912: Hike and the Aeroplane (juvenile, as Tom Graham)
- 1914: Our Mr. Wrenn: The Romantic Adventures of a Gentle Man
- 1915: The Trail of the Hawk: A Comedy of the Seriousness of Life
- 1917: The Job
- 1917: The Innocents: A Story for Lovers
- 1919: Free Air
  Serialized in The Saturday Evening Post, May 31, June 7, June 14 and 21, 1919
- 1920: Main Street
- 1922: Babbitt
  Excerpted in Hearst's International, October 1922
- 1925: Arrowsmith
- 1926: Mantrap
  Serialized in Collier's, February 20, March 20 and April 24, 1926
- 1927: Elmer Gantry
- 1928: The Man Who Knew Coolidge: Being the Soul of Lowell Schmaltz, Constructive and Nordic Citizen
- 1929: Dodsworth
- 1933: Ann Vickers
  Serialized in Redbook, August, November and December 1932
- 1934: Work of Art
- 1935: It Can't Happen Here
- 1938: The Prodigal Parents
- 1940: Bethel Merriday
- 1943: Gideon Planish
- 1945: Cass Timberlane: A Novel of Husbands and Wives
  Appeared in Cosmopolitan, July 1945.
- 1947: Kingsblood Royal
- 1949: The God-Seeker
- 1951: World So Wide (posthumous)

Babbitt, Mantrap and Cass Timberlane were published as Armed Services Editions during WWII.

=== Short stories ===
- 1907: "That Passage in Isaiah", The Blue Mule, May 1907
- 1907: "Art and the Woman", The Gray Goose, June 1907
- 1911: "The Way to Rome", The Bellman, May 13, 1911
- 1915: "Commutation: $9.17", The Saturday Evening Post, October 30, 1915
- 1915: "The Other Side of the House", The Saturday Evening Post, November 27, 1915
- 1916: "If I Were Boss", The Saturday Evening Post, January 1 and 8, 1916
- 1916: "I'm a Stranger Here Myself", The Smart Set, August 1916
- 1916: "He Loved His Country", Everybody's Magazine, October 1916
- 1916: "Honestly If Possible", The Saturday Evening Post, October 14, 191
- 1917: "Twenty-Four Hours in June", The Saturday Evening Post, February 17, 1917
- 1917: "The Innocents", Woman's Home Companion, March 1917
- 1917: "A Story with a Happy Ending", The Saturday Evening Post, March 17, 1917
- 1917: "Hobohemia", The Saturday Evening Post, April 7, 1917
- 1917: "The Ghost Patrol", The Red Book Magazine, June 1917
  Adapted for the silent film The Ghost Patrol (1923)
- 1917: "Young Man Axelbrod", The Century, June 1917
- 1917: "A Woman by Candlelight", The Saturday Evening Post, July 28, 1917
- 1917: "The Whisperer", The Saturday Evening Post, August 11, 1917
- 1917: "The Hidden People", Good Housekeeping, September 1917
- 1917: "Joy-Joy", The Saturday Evening Post, October 20, 1917
- 1918: "A Rose for Little Eva", McClure's, February 1918
- 1918: "Slip It to 'Em", Metropolitan Magazine, March 1918
- 1918: "An Invitation to Tea", Every Week, June 1, 1918
- 1918: "The Shadowy Glass", The Saturday Evening Post, June 22, 1918
- 1918: "The Willow Walk", The Saturday Evening Post, August 10, 1918
- 1918: "Getting His Bit", Metropolitan Magazine, September 1918
- 1918: "The Swept Hearth", The Saturday Evening Post, September 21, 1918
- 1918: "Jazz", Metropolitan Magazine, October 1918
- 1918: "Gladvertising", The Popular Magazine, October 7, 1918
- 1919: "Moths in the Arc Light", The Saturday Evening Post, January 11, 1919
- 1919: "The Shrinking Violet", The Saturday Evening Post, February 15, 1919
- 1919: "Things", The Saturday Evening Post, February 22, 1919
- 1919: "The Cat of the Stars", The Saturday Evening Post, April 19, 1919
- 1919: "The Watcher Across the Road", The Saturday Evening Post, May 24, 1919
- 1919: "Speed", The Red Book Magazine, June 1919
- 1919: "The Shrimp-Colored Blouse", The Red Book Magazine, August 1919
- 1919: "The Enchanted Hour", The Saturday Evening Post, August 9, 1919
- 1919: "Danger—Run Slow", The Saturday Evening Post, October 18 and 25, 1919
- 1919: "Bronze Bars", The Saturday Evening Post, December 13, 1919
- 1920: "Habeas Corpus", The Saturday Evening Post, January 24, 1920
- 1920: "Way I See It", The Saturday Evening Post, May 29, 1920
- 1920: "The Good Sport", The Saturday Evening Post, December 11, 1920
- 1921: "A Matter of Business", Harper's, March 1921
- 1921: "Number Seven to Sagapoose", The American Magazine, May 1921
- 1921: "The Post-Mortem Murder", The Century, May 1921
- 1923: "The Hack Driver", The Nation, August 29, 1923
- 1929: "He Had a Brother", Cosmopolitan, May 1929
- 1929: "There Was a Prince", Cosmopolitan, June 1929
- 1929: "Elizabeth, Kitty and Jane", Cosmopolitan, July 1929
- 1929: "Dear Editor", Cosmopolitan, August 1929
- 1929: "What a Man!", Cosmopolitan, September 1929
- 1929: "Keep Out of the Kitchen", Cosmopolitan, October 1929
- 1929: "A Letter from the Queen", Cosmopolitan, December 1929
- 1930: "Youth", Cosmopolitan, February 1930
- 1930: "Noble Experiment", Cosmopolitan, August 1930
- 1930: "Bongo", Cosmopolitan, September 1930
  Adapted for the animated feature film Fun and Fancy Free (1947)
- 1930: "Go East, Young Man", Cosmopolitan, December 1930
- 1931: "Let's Play King", Cosmopolitan, January, February and March 1931
- 1931: "Pajamas", Redbook, April 1931
- 1931: "Ring Around a Rosy", The Saturday Evening Post, June 6, 1931
- 1931: "City of Mercy", Cosmopolitan, July 1931
- 1931: "Land", The Saturday Evening Post, September 12, 1931
- 1931: "Dollar Chasers", The Saturday Evening Post, October 17 and 24, 1931
- 1935: "The Hippocratic Oath", Cosmopolitan, June 1935
- 1935: "Proper Gander", The Saturday Evening Post, July 13, 1935
- 1935: "Onward, Sons of Ingersoll!", Scribner's, August 1935
- 1936: "From the Queen", Argosy, February 1936
- 1941: "The Man Who Cheated Time", Good Housekeeping, March 1941
- 1941: "Manhattan Madness", The American Magazine, September 1941
- 1941: "They Had Magic Then!", Liberty, September 6, 1941
- 1943: "All Wives Are Angels", Cosmopolitan, February 1943
- 1943: "Nobody to Write About", Cosmopolitan, July 1943
- 1943: "Green Eyes—A Handbook of Jealousy", Cosmopolitan, September and October 1943
- 1943: Harri
  Serialized in Good Housekeeping, August, September 1943 ISBN 978-1523653508(novella)

==== The Short Stories of Sinclair Lewis (1904–1949) ====
Samuel J. Rogal edited The Short Stories of Sinclair Lewis (1904–1949), a seven-volume set published in 2007 by Edwin Mellen Press. The first attempt to collect all of Lewis's short stories.

- Volume 1 (June 1904 – January 1916) ISBN 9780773454873
- Volume 2 (August 1916 – October 1917) ISBN 9780773454897
- Volume 3 (January 1918 – February 1919) ISBN 9780773454910
- Volume 4 (February 1919 – May 1921) ISBN 9780773454194
- Volume 5 (August 1923 – April 1931) ISBN 9780773453562
- Volume 6 (June 1931 – March 1941) ISBN 9780773453067
- Volume 7 (September 1941 – May 1949) ISBN 9780773452763

=== Articles ===
- 1915: "Nature, Inc.", The Saturday Evening Post, October 2, 1915
- 1917: "For the Zelda Bunch", McClure's, October 1917
- 1918: "Spiritualist Vaudeville", Metropolitan Magazine, February 1918
- 1919: "Adventures in Autobumming: Gasoline Gypsies", The Saturday Evening Post, December 20, 1919
- 1919: "Adventures in Autobumming: Want a Lift?", The Saturday Evening Post, December 27, 1919
- 1920: "Adventures in Autobumming: The Great American Frying Pan", The Saturday Evening Post, January 3, 1920

=== Plays ===
- 1919: Hobohemia
- 1934: Jayhawker: A Play in Three Acts (with Lloyd Lewis)
- 1936: It Can't Happen Here (with John C. Moffitt)
- 1938: Angela Is Twenty-Two (with Fay Wray)
  Adapted for the feature film This Is the Life (1944)

=== Screenplay ===
- 1943: Storm In the West (with Dore Schary – unproduced)

=== Poems ===
- 1907: "The Ultra-Modern", The Smart Set, July 1907
- 1907: "Dim Hours of Dusk", The Smart Set, August 1907
- 1907: "Disillusion", The Smart Set, December 1907
- 1909: "Summer in Winter", People's Magazine, February 1909
- 1912: "A Canticle of Great Lovers", Ainslee's Magazine, July 1912

=== Forewords ===
- 1942: Henry Ward Beecher: An American Portrait (by Paxton Hibben; publisher: The Press of the Readers Club, NY NY)

=== Books ===
- 1915: Tennis As I Play It (ghostwritten for Maurice McLoughlin)
- 1926: John Dos Passos' Manhattan Transfer
- 1929: Cheap and Contented Labor: The Picture of a Southern Mill Town in 1929
- 1935: Selected Short Stories of Sinclair Lewis
- 1952: From Main Street to Stockholm: Letters of Sinclair Lewis, 1919–1930 (edited by Alfred Harcourt and Oliver Harrison)
- 1953: A Sinclair Lewis Reader: Selected Essays and Other Writings, 1904–1950 (edited by Harry E. Maule and Melville Cane)
- 1962: I'm a Stranger Here Myself and Other Stories (edited by Mark Schorer)
- 1962: Sinclair Lewis: A Collection of Critical Essays (edited by Mark Schorer)
- 1985: Selected Letters of Sinclair Lewis (edited by John J. Koblas and Dave Page)
- 1997: If I Were Boss: The Early Business Stories of Sinclair Lewis (edited by Anthony Di Renzo)
- 2000: Minnesota Diary, 1942–46 (edited by George Killough)
- 2005: Go East, Young Man: Sinclair Lewis on Class in America (edited by Sally E. Parry)
- 2005: The Minnesota Stories of Sinclair Lewis (edited by Sally E. Parry)

== See also ==
- Sinclair Lewis Boyhood Home
- The Palmer House (Sauk Centre)
