= Arrowsmith (novel) =

1925 novel by Sinclair Lewis

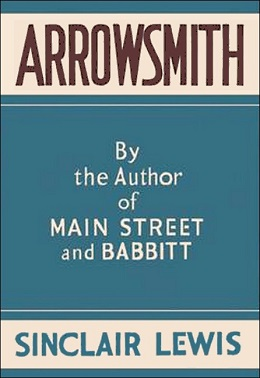
- First edition
- Author: Sinclair Lewis
- Language: English
- Publisher: Harcourt Brace & Co. (US); Jonathan Cape (UK)
- Publication date: 1925
- Publication place: United States
- Media type: Print (hardback & paperback), digital, and audio cassette
- Pages: 440 pp (paperback)
- ISBN: 0-451-52691-0 (paperback); ISBN 0-89966-402-4 (hardcover)
- OCLC: 373012
- Text: Arrowsmith at Wikisource

Arrowsmith is a novel by American author Sinclair Lewis, first published in 1925. It won the 1926 Pulitzer Prize (which Lewis declined). Lewis was greatly assisted in its preparation by science writer Paul de Kruif, who received 25% of the royalties on sales, although Lewis was listed as the sole author.

Arrowsmith is an early major novel dealing with the culture of science. It was written in the period after the reforms of medical education flowing from the Flexner Report on Medical Education in the United States and Canada: A Report to the Carnegie Foundation for the Advancement of Teaching, 1910, which had called on medical schools in the United States to adhere to mainstream science in their teaching and research.

The book was adapted by Hollywood as Arrowsmith in 1931, starring Ronald Colman and Helen Hayes.

== Plot ==
Arrowsmith tells the story of bright and scientifically minded Martin Arrowsmith of Elk Mills, Winnemac (the same fictional state in which several of Lewis's other novels are set), as he makes his way from a small town in the Midwest to the upper echelons of the scientific community at a prestigious foundation in New York City. Along the way, he begins medical school. He becomes engaged to one woman, is unfaithful to her with another woman, becomes engaged to the second woman, and then finally invites both women to a lunch to settle the issue. He eventually insults his mentor, Max Gottlieb, and is suspended from school. He takes up life as an ordinary worker, then marries Leora, with her family supporting him based on the promise that he will take up private practice as the only doctor in tiny Wheatsylvania, North Dakota. Frustrated with the work, he moves on to a job at the state Department of Public Health branch in Nautilus, Iowa, then becomes romantically involved with the young daughter of its local director. After a series of political disputes, he resigns and joins the staff of an exclusive private hospital in Chicago. Finally, Arrowsmith is recognized by his former mentor, Gottlieb, for a scientific paper he has written, and is invited to take a post with a wealthy and elite research institute in New York City. The book's climax deals with Arrowsmith's discovery of a phage that destroys bacteria and his experiences as he faces an outbreak of bubonic plague on a fictional Caribbean island.

His scientific principles demand that he avoid its mass use on the island until thoroughly tested, even at the expense of lives that might be saved. Only after his wife, Leora, and all the other people who came with him from the institute to the island die of plague, does he reluctantly abandon rigorous science and begins to treat everyone on the island with the phage. While there, he becomes romantically involved with a wealthy socialite, whom he later marries. In spite of his saving lives, he regards his actions on the island as a complete betrayal of science and his principles.

Upon his return to New York City, he is heralded as a public hero for his actions on the island. He is first promoted within the laboratory and then offered the directorship of the entire institute. He turns down the promotion, then abandons his new wife and infant son to work in the backwoods of Vermont as an entirely independent scientist. When his wife finally offers to move to Vermont to be close to him, he tells her that he wants nothing to do with her, and she should just go away.

== Themes ==
The book contains considerable social commentary on the state and prospects of medicine in the United States in the 1920s. Arrowsmith is a progressive, even something of a rebel, and often challenges the existing state of affairs when he finds it wanting.

This novel has been inspirational for several generations of premedical and medical students. Much agonizing occurs along the way concerning career and life decisions. While detailing Arrowsmith's pursuit of the noble ideals of medical research for the benefit of mankind and of selfless devotion to the care of patients, Lewis throws many less-noble temptations and self-deceptions in Arrowsmith's path. The attractions of financial security, recognition, even wealth and power, lure Arrowsmith away from following the footsteps of his first mentor, the brilliant but abrasive bacteriologist Max Gottlieb.

In the course of the novel, Lewis describes many aspects of medical training, medical practice, scientific research, scientific fraud, medical ethics, public health, and personal/professional conflicts that are still relevant today. Professional jealousy, institutional pressures, greed, stupidity, and negligence are all satirically depicted, and Arrowsmith himself is exasperatingly self-involved, but there is also tireless dedication and respect for the scientific method and intellectual honesty.

Martin Arrowsmith shares some biographical elements with Félix d'Herelle, who is identified in the novel as a co-discoverer of the bacteriophage and represented as having beaten Arrowsmith into publication with his results.

Because of its detailed and gripping portrayal of experimental laboratory research as a practice, a profession, an ideology, a worldview, and a “prominent strand in modern culture, a way of life”, Arrowsmith is generally acknowledged as a classic 'science novel', focusing on moral dilemmas bio-medical researchers may encounter. Educator and school founder Lisa VanDamme describes using the ethical challenges and world outlook presented in Arrowsmith: “…I might give one class about the idealistic characters and in what way they are doomed to suffering in the world, another about those who abandon their ideals and achieve practical ‘success’, another about the basic moral-practical dichotomy this implies, and another contrasting this view with that of...[other novelists].”

Arrowsmith has been compared with The Citadel, published in 1937 by A. J. Cronin, which also deals with the experiences of a young, idealistic doctor who tries to challenge and improve the existing system of medical practice.

Sinclair’s scientific collaborator Paul de Kruif drew inspiration for locations and characters in Arrowsmith from specific sources. The laboratory work and experimental process of Max Gottlieb were based on the careers of Frederick George Novy and Jacques Loeb. Loeb and De Kruif both worked at the Rockefeller Institute for Medical Research in New York, and Novy was De Kruif's longtime mentor.

A writer in Public Health Reports commented in 2001 that the novel predicted many of the successes and problems affecting today's medical profession, such as the competing needs and goals of clinicians and medical scientists, commercial interests of pharmaceutical companies developing new medications and vaccines versus the need to seek for scientific truth, political and social difficulties in developing programs for protecting a community's public health, and the doctor's evolving role in American society.

Scholars have found eerie parallels to the COVID-19 crisis in the 1925 novel, and the many ethical dilemmas and challenges it presents.

== Pulitzer Prize ==
Arrowsmith was awarded the 1926 Pulitzer Prize for Fiction, but Lewis declined the award. In a letter to the committee, he wrote:

I wish to acknowledge your choice of my novel Arrowsmith for the Pulitzer Prize. That prize I must refuse, and my refusal would be meaningless unless I explained the reasons.

All prizes, like all titles, are dangerous. The seekers for prizes tend to labor not for inherent excellence but for alien rewards; they tend to write this, or timorously to avoid writing that, in order to tickle the prejudices of a haphazard committee. And the Pulitzer Prize for Novels is peculiarly objectionable because the terms of it have been constantly and grievously misrepresented.

Those terms are that the prize shall be given "for the American novel published during the year which shall best present the wholesome atmosphere of American life, and the highest standard of American manners and manhood." This phrase, if it means anything whatsoever, would appear to mean that the appraisal of the novels shall be made not according to their actual literary merit but in obedience to whatever code of Good Form may chance to be popular at the moment.

The New York Times reported that, according to observers, the real reason was that Lewis was still upset that Main Street did not win the prize in 1921.

== Film, radio, and television adaptations ==
The book's only theatrically released adaptation was the film Arrowsmith in 1931, featuring Ronald Colman and Helen Hayes as Arrowsmith and Leora and Myrna Loy as socialite Mrs. Joyce Lanyon. It was nominated for four Academy Awards, including Best Adapted Screenplay.

Lux Radio Theater presented a one-hour radio adaptation on October 25, 1937, starring Spencer Tracy and Fay Wray.

Helen Hayes reprised her role as Leora in an hour-long adaptation on The Campbell Playhouse radio program along with Orson Welles as Arrowsmith. The program aired on February 3, 1939.

Cavalcade of America presented a version on February 23, 1942, with Tyrone Power in the title role.

In the 1950s and '60s, the book was adapted several times for television, and condensed versions of the story were produced for such television shows as Kraft Television Theater and DuPont Show of the Month.

A Czech miniseries was produced in 1999, with Jan Stastny in the title role and Tereza Brodská as Leora Tozerova.

A popular myth is that the rock band Aerosmith took its name from this book. Although the members were required to read this book in school, they have repeatedly and adamantly denied any connection. In fact, the name was initially rejected because they thought drummer Joey Kramer got the name from the Lewis novel. When he explained the different spelling and that the name came to him while listening to Harry Nilsson's album Aerial Ballet, the name was accepted by the other members.
