= Main Street (novel) =

1920 novel by Sinclair Lewis

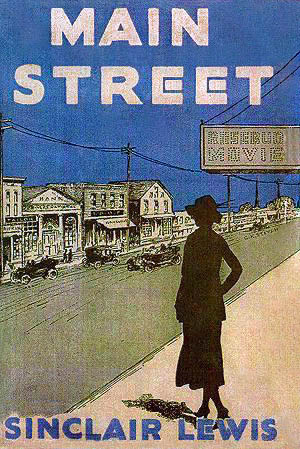
- First edition
- Author: Sinclair Lewis
- Language: English
- Publisher: Harcourt, Brace and Howe
- Publication date: 1920
- Publication place: United States
- Media type: Print (hardback & paperback), and audiobook
- Pages: 448 pages
- ISBN: 1420930923

Main Street is a novel written by Sinclair Lewis, and published in 1920. Satirizing small-town life, Main Street is perhaps Sinclair Lewis's most famous book and led in part to his eventual 1930 Nobel Prize for Literature.

The story is set in the small town of Gopher Prairie, a fictionalized version of Sauk Centre, Minnesota, Lewis's hometown, during the 1910s. It relates the life and struggles of Carol Milford Kennicott, a self-made young woman with a strong personality, as she comes into conflict with the small-town mentality of the residents of Gopher Prairie. References are made to the start of World War I, the United States' entry into the war, and the years following its end, including the start of Prohibition in 1920.

Highly acclaimed upon publication, Main Street was turned into a play in 1921, and a movie in 1923, the first by Warner Bros. studio. It remains a recognized American classic.

== Plot ==
Carol Milford, the daughter of a judge, grew up in Mankato, Minnesota, and became an orphan in her teenage years. In college, she reads a book on village improvement in a sociology class and begins to dream of redesigning villages and towns. After college, she attends a library school in Chicago and is exposed to many radical ideas and lifestyles. She becomes a librarian in Saint Paul, Minnesota, the state capital, but finds the work unrewarding. She marries Will Kennicott, a doctor from the small town of Gopher Prairie. When they marry, Will convinces her to live in his hometown. Carol is filled with disdain for the town's physical ugliness and smug conservatism and immediately formulates plans to remake Gopher Prairie.

She speaks with its members about progressive changes, joins women's clubs, distributes literature, and holds a party to liven up Gopher Prairie's inhabitants. Despite her efforts, these ventures are ineffective and she is constantly derided by the leading cliques. She finds some comfort and companionship with a variety of social outsiders in the town, but these companions all fail to live up to her expectations.

After a political meeting of the Nonpartisan League is broken up by local authorities, Carol leaves her husband and moves to Washington, D.C. to become a clerk in a wartime government agency but she eventually returns. Nevertheless, she does not feel defeated:

I do not admit that Main Street is as beautiful as it should be! I do not admit that Gopher Prairie is greater or more generous than Europe! I do not admit that dishwashing is enough to satisfy all women! I may not have fought the good fight, but I have kept the faith. (Chapter 39)

== Reception ==
The book was a commercial success. It was the best-selling work of fiction in the United States for the year 1921, according to Publishers Weekly.

Some of Lewis's contemporaries said the novel was too bleak, even humorless, in its portrayal of ignorant small-town life and people. However, Main Street is generally considered some of Lewis's most significant and enduring work, along with its 1922 successor Babbitt.

Contemporary parodies of the book included Ptomaine Street, by Carolyn Wells, and Jane Street of Gopher Prairie, by James Stetson Metcalfe.

Some small-town residents resented being portrayed this way, and the book was banned by the public library of Alexandria, Minnesota.

Because Lewis and his book had become so popular, high-school sports teams from his hometown began to be called the Main Streeters as early as the 1925–26 school year. This name was essentially given to the town by the nearby towns at school events. Sauk Centre High School teams still go by the name in a tribute to Lewis.

== Awards and nominations ==
Main Street was initially chosen by the jury for the 1921 Pulitzer Prize for literature, but the board of trustees overturned the jury's decision. The prize went to Edith Wharton for The Age of Innocence. In 1926, Lewis refused the Pulitzer when he was awarded it for Arrowsmith.

In 1930, Lewis was the first American to be awarded the Nobel Prize in Literature. While a Nobel Prize is awarded to the author, not the work, and the award itself does not cite a particular work for which he was chosen, Main Street was Lewis' best-known work and enormously popular at the time. In the Nobel committee's presentation speech, both Main Street and Arrowsmith were cited. The prize was awarded "... for his vigorous and graphic art of description and his ability to create, with wit and humour, new types of characters."

In 1998, the Modern Library ranked Main Street #68 on its list of the 100 best English-language novels of the 20th century.

== See also ==
- Main Street — the iconic street in small-town America
- I Married a Doctor — 1936 Warner Bros. adaptation of Main Street
