= Appignani =

Appignani is a surname. Notable people with the surname include:

- Adelaide Orsola Appignani (1807–1884), Italian singer, conductor, music educator, and composer
- Louis Appignani (1933–2026), American businessman and philanthropist
