= Charles Judson Herrick =

American neurobiologist (1868–1960)

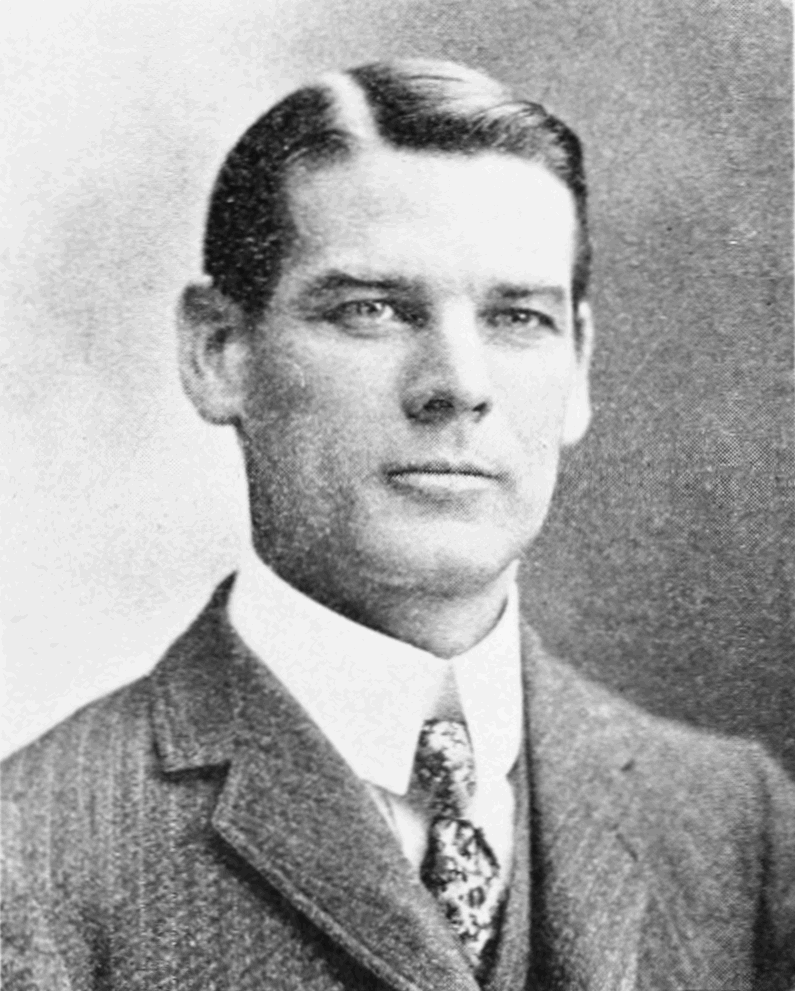

Charles Judson Herrick (6 October 1868 – 29 January 1960) was an American neurobiologist who made comparative studies across vertebrate neural systems. Along with his brother Clarence Luther, he was a founding editor of the Journal of Comparative Neurology. He published several popular books including the Neurological Foundations of Animal Behavior (1924), The Brain of Rats and Men (1926), and The Thinking Machine (1928).

Herrick came from an English family that came to Massachusetts in 1628. Charles was born to Nathan, a Baptist pastor, and Anna Strickler in Minneapolis. Along with his brother Clarence he spent his early life collecting plants and obtained a BS in science from the University of Cincinnati in 1891. Shortly after, he married Mary Elizabeth Talbot, daughter of a retired president of Denison University. He then joined Denison University for a master's degree while his brother Clarence became a professor there but had to resign due to tuberculosis. Clarence had begun a Journal of Comparative Neurology which was managed by Charles during his brother's ill-health. In 1896 he went to Columbia University and worked for a PhD, studying the cranial nerves of bony fish and returned to Denison in 1898 to become a professor. He became a specialist on the amphibian brain and published The Brain of the Tiger Salamander in 1948. In 1956 he published Evolution of Human Nature which covered the outline of his research interests. The same year, the American Humanist Association named him the Humanist of the Year.

Herrick has been characterized as a progressive psychobiologist who saw the evolution of the brain in terms of dealing with environmental challenges with an underlying belief that progress was natural and that biological studies provided support for social change in a direction that led to utopia, peace and prosperity. His students (who included Charles Manning Child and George Ellett Coghill) believed that structure and function needed to be studied together as indeed mind and body. It has been suggested that it may have been derived from a Baptist faith. Writing in 1954, Herrick wrote that "The test of the truth of a scientific law or principle is its predictive value, and the prediction is an act of faith. There is always a factor of faith in every scientific generalization and indeed in every fact- faith in the order of nature, faith in the reliability of the observations, and faith in the trustworthiness of the record." He died at his home in Grand Rapids and is buried beside his wife in the campus of Denison University.
