= Essays in the Philosophy of Humanism =

- Discipline: Philosophy, humanism, religion, social sciences, classics
- Language: English
- Edited by: Marian Hillar

Publication details
- History: 1992–present
- Publisher: American Humanist Association (United States)
- Frequency: Biannually

Standard abbreviations
- ISO 4: Essays Philos. Humanism

Indexing
- ISSN: 1522-7340
- LCCN: 98656789
- OCLC no.: 39802374

Links
- Journal homepage; Online archive

Essays in the Philosophy of Humanism is a peer-reviewed academic journal and the official journal of the American Humanist Association. It is published twice annually and edited by Marian Hillar. It covers the philosophy of humanism.

== Origins ==
In 1992 "Humanists of Houston", a chapter of the American Humanist Association, decided at the initiative of Marian Hillar and Robert Finch to publish lectures and seminars that were presented by notable speakers at the meetings of the group, doing so under the general title Essays in the Philosophy of Humanism. With time the scope of the publication was enlarged to include solicited and unsolicited papers from others. In 2005, the American Humanist Association adopted Essays in the Philosophy of Humanism as its official journal.
