= NDOR =

NDOR may refer to:

- National Day of Reason, a secular celebration for humanists, atheists, and other secularists and freethinkers in response to the National Day of Prayer
- Nebraska Department of Roads
