= Charles Henry Turner (zoologist) =

American entomologist (1867–1923)

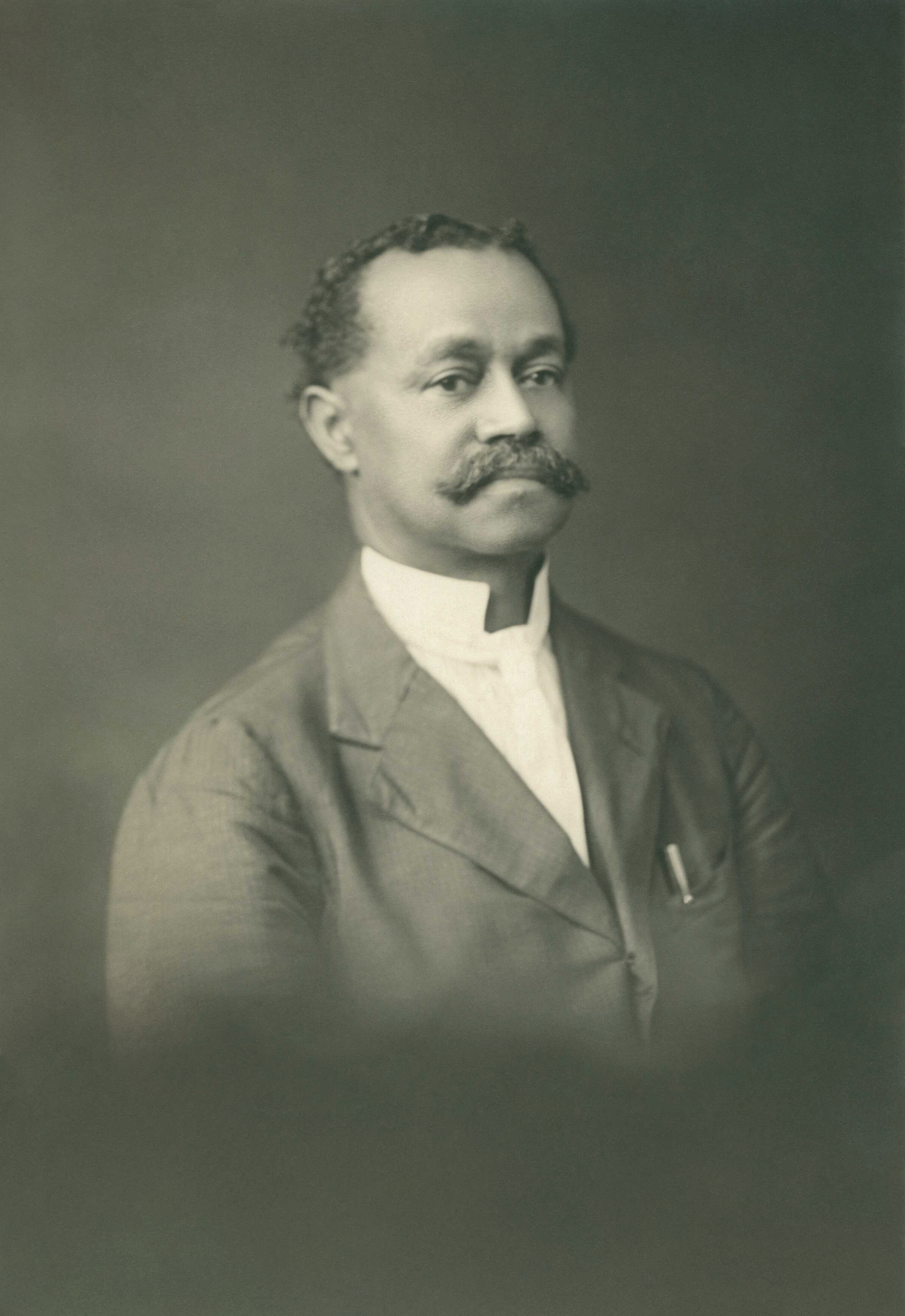
- Turner in 1921
- Born: February 3, 1867; Cincinnati, Ohio, U.S.
- Died: February 14, 1923 (aged 56); Chicago, Illinois, U.S.
- Resting place: Lincoln Cemetery, Chicago, Illinois, U.S.
- Education: University of Cincinnati (B.S., M.S.); University of Chicago (Ph.D.)
- Spouses: Leontine Troy (m. 1886; died 1895): Lillian Porter (m. 1907 or 1908)
- Children: 3
- Scientific career
- Fields: Zoology

Charles Henry Turner (February 3, 1867 – February 14, 1923) was an American zoologist, entomologist, educator, and comparative psychologist, known for his studies on the behavior of insects, particularly bees and ants. Born in Cincinnati, Turner was the first African American to receive a graduate degree at the University of Cincinnati and the first African American to earn a PhD from the University of Chicago (1907). He spent most of his career as a high school teacher at Sumner High School in St. Louis. Turner was one of the first scientists to systematically examine the question of whether animals display complex cognition, studying arthropods such as spiders and bees. He also examined differences in behavior between individuals within a species, a precursor to the study of animal personality.

== Personal life ==
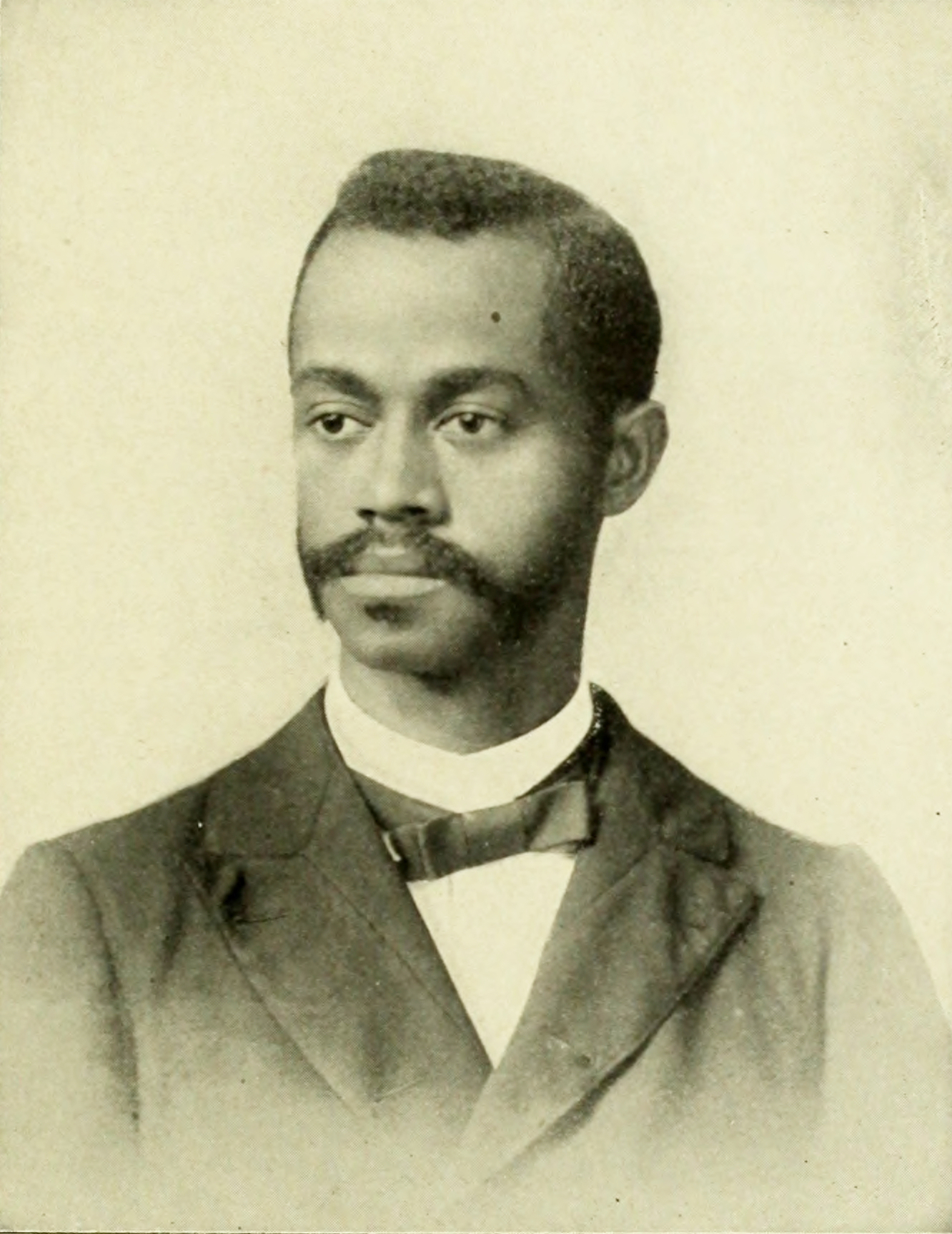
Charles Henry Turner aged about 35

Charles Henry Turner was born in Cincinnati, Ohio on February 3, 1867. He was born to parents Thomas Turner, a church custodian, and Addie Campbell, a nurse from Lexington, Kentucky. His father had moved from Alberta to Cincinnati. He married Leontine Troy in 1886. They had three children; Henry Owen Turner (1892–1956), Louise Mae Turner (1892,1894-?), and Darwin Romanes Turner (1894–1983). Leontine died in 1895, and Turner married Lillian Porter in 1907 or 1908. Lillian survived her husband, who died in Chicago at his son Darwin's home on February 14, 1923, from acute myocarditis. He was buried in Chicago's Lincoln Cemetery. Charles Henry Turner was the grandfather of Boston City Councillor and community organizer Chuck Turner.

== Academic career ==
In 1886, Turner graduated valedictorian of Woodward High School, marking the start of his academic career. He entered the University of Cincinnati in 1886 and graduated with B.S. degree in biology in 1891. Turner's mentor, early comparative psychologist and biologist, Clarence L. Herrick, helped him earn his bachelor's degree. A summary of his undergraduate thesis on the neuroanatomy of bird brains was published in the journal Science in 1891, making him the first African American to be so recognized.

Turner earned an M.S. in 1892 from the University of Cincinnati under his undergraduate advisor, Herrick. After receiving his degree, he remained at the university as assistant instructor in the biology laboratory until 1893. Turner studied for a Ph.D. at Denison University from 1893 to 1894, but the program was discontinued. He attained a professorship in the Science Department at Clark College in Atlanta, Georgia, where he also served as Chair of the Science Department. The Turner-Tanner Hall at Clark Atlanta University is now named in his honor. Sources fail to determine his length of service, but it is estimated that he was at Clark sometime between 1893 until 1905.

After his time at Clark College, Turner had his first career experience at a high school in 1906 when he obtained a position as the principal of College Hill High School in Cleveland, Tennessee. He then resigned the position in order to pursue a professorship in biology and chemistry at Haines Normal and Industrial Institute in Augusta, Georgia in 1907. While he was teaching, he continued to study insect behavior, and also pursued a Ph.D. at the University of Chicago. He spent the 1906–1907 academic year and the summer of 1906 working on his doctoral degree before graduating magna cum laude in 1907. He was the third African American person to receive an advanced degree from the University of Chicago, and among the first African Americans to receive a doctorate from that university (older doctorates included Edward Bouchet (1876) from Yale and W. E. B. Du Bois (1895) from Harvard). During the Seventh International Zoological Congress, Turner was a delegate. He was advised by zoologists Charles M. Child, Frank R. Lillie, and Charles O. Whitman.

In 1908, Turner gained a teaching position at Sumner High School, where he remained until his retirement in 1922 due to ill health. It is somewhat contested whether Turner chose to teach in high school or if he was unable to find a permanent position in academia. Between 1893 and 1908, Turner applied for a position at the Tuskegee Institute. Charles I. Abramson, in his 2003 article on Turner for the American Bee Journal, claims that Turner was unable, rather than unwilling, to get an appointment at the University of Chicago, and that the Tuskegee Institute could not afford his salary.

=== Scientific contributions ===
Turner published 49 papers on invertebrates, including "Habits of Mound-Building Ants", "Experiments on the Color Vision of the Honeybee", "Hunting Habits of an American Sand Wasp", and "Psychological Notes on the Gallery Spider". He was the first to study systematically differences in psychology between invertebrates. He concluded from the variations seen in spider web construction that the details in the construction involved intelligence rather than mere instinct as then attributed. Much of his research was conducted while he was teaching high school classes at Sumner; while there, he published 41 papers between 1908 and his death. Notably, Turner published three times in the journal Science. In his research, Turner became the first person to prove that insects can hear and can distinguish pitch. In addition, he first discovered that cockroaches can learn by trial and error and that honeybees can see visual patterns. Although he attempted to demonstrate that bees were endowed with color vision capabilities, his experiments could not prove this as he used red cardboards to this end, which bees do not see as a color. Yet, in doing these experiments, he advanced important principles of associative learning such as stimulus substitution, the fact that a conditioning stimulus becomes a reliable predictor of an unconditioned stimulus.

Turner's work was different from the majority of scientists of his time as he clearly adopted a cognitive perspective to analyze animal behavior. He used concepts such as learning, memory and expectation, in a time when most scientists believed that animals such as insects were exclusively driven by reflexive taxis, innate reactions to external stimuli. This cognitive view would only reemerge much later in studies of animal behavior. In 1908, he did the first experimental demonstration that bees remembered their home location using a memory of landmarks by observing a burrowing bee entering its nest and afterwards constructing a fake nest burrow with similar surrounding features which was then entered by the bee. He was also the first to suggest invertebrates had 'outcome awareness' after observing an isolated ant attempting to build a bridge back to safe ground from a range of materials.

Turner conducted a large majority of his bee research at O'Fallon Park in North St. Louis, Missouri. One such 1908 experiment there is particularly noted because it demonstrated that bees can adapt their foraging habits to a schedule and therefore were able to perceive time.

Selected publications include:

- Turner, C H (January 1, 1892). "A Grape Vine Produces Two Sets of Leaves During the Same Season". Science. 20 (493): 39. doi:10.1126/science.ns-20.493.39.a. PMID 17753853. S2CID 239877691.
- Turner, C H (1892). "Psychological Notes upon the Gallery Spider—Illustrations of Intelligent Variations in the Construction of the Web". Journal of Comparative Neurology. 2 (1): 95–110. doi:10.1002/cne.910020112. S2CID 84714595.
- Turner, Charles Henry (1907). The Homing of Ants: An Experimental Study of Ant Behavior. University of Chicago Press. p. 434.

Cited by, among a great many others:

- Low, Isabel I C; Giocomo, Lisa M (November 4, 2021). "Fifty Years of the Brain's Sense of Space". Nature. 599 (7885). Nature Portfolio: 376–377. Bibcode:2021Natur.599..376L. doi:10.1038/d41586-021-03010-7. ISSN 0028-0836. PMID 34737409. S2CID 243762786.

- Turner, C H (October 22, 1909). "The Behavior of a Snake". Science. 30 (773): 563–564. Bibcode:1909Sci....30..563T. doi:10.1126/science.30.773.563. PMID 17817501.

== Legacy ==
Besides his scientific work, Turner was active in the struggle to obtain social and educational services for African Americans in St. Louis, Missouri. Two years after his death, The Charles Henry Turner Open Air School for Crippled Children was founded; it was later renamed as Turner Middle School. To honor Turner, the Animal Behavior Society named its undergraduate diversity program after him.
