= Thomas Klockgether =

Thomas Klockgether is a German neurologist who has worked in clinical research and neurodegenerative diseases. He has held academic and research positions, including serving as the Director of Clinical Research at the German Center for Neurodegenerative Diseases (DZNE) and as Professor and Chair of Neurology at the University of Bonn.

== Education ==
Klockgether studied medicine at the University of Göttingen from 1974 to 1980. He later pursued specialization in neurology, earning his board certification at the Department of Neurology, University of Tübingen, between 1987 and 1991. In 1991, he completed his habilitation at the University of Tübingen.

== Career ==
From 1987 to 1991, Klockgether trained in neurology at the University of Tübingen, where he expanded his research to include degenerative ataxias while continuing his work on Parkinson's disease. In 1991, he obtained board certification in neurology and was appointed senior physician and lecturer at the University of Tübingen.

In 1998, he became Professor and Chair of Neurology at the University of Bonn, a position he held until 2024. From 2008 to 2011, he served as the Dean of the Medical Faculty at the University of Bonn. In 2011, he became the Director of Clinical Research at the German Center for Neurodegenerative Diseases (DZNE), a role he held until 2024. Between 2004 and 2008, he was also a section editor for Experimental Neurology.

== Honors ==
- Research.com Neuroscience in Germany Leader Award (2024)
- Elected Member of Academia Europaea (2023)
