= Ashley Montagu =

British-American anthropologist

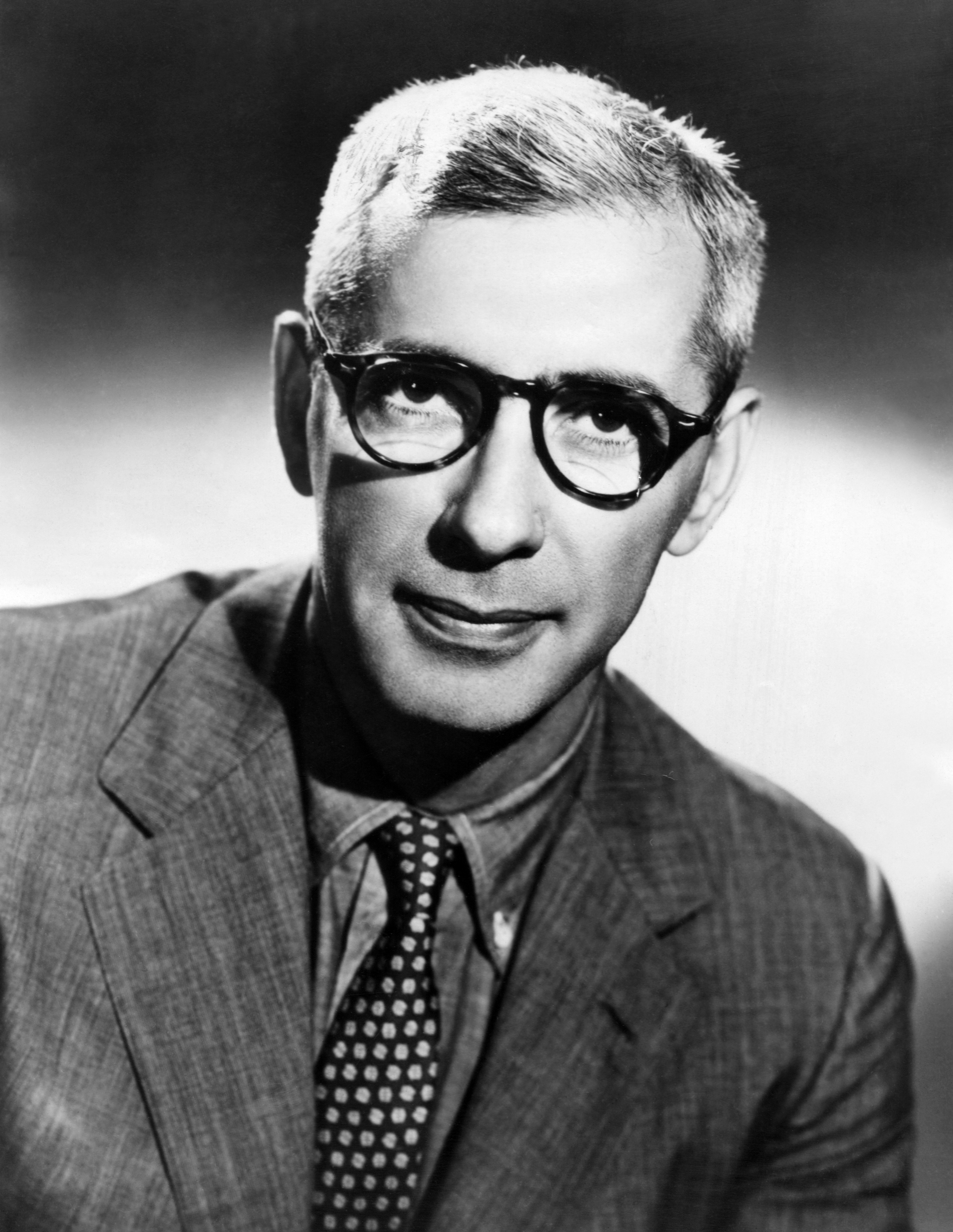
- Montagu in 1958
- Born: Israel Ehrenberg; 28 June 1905; London, United Kingdom
- Died: 26 November 1999 (aged 94); Princeton, New Jersey, U.S.
- Citizenship: American
- Education: University College London; London School of Economics; Columbia University
- Known for: Popularizing the term "ethnic group"
- Scientific career
- Fields: Anthropology

Montague Francis Ashley-Montagu (born Israel Ehrenberg; June 28, 1905 – November 26, 1999) was a British-American anthropologist who popularized the study of topics such as race and gender and their relation to politics and development. He was the rapporteur, in 1950, for the UNESCO "statement on race".

As a young man he changed his name from Ehrenberg to "Montague Francis Ashley-Montagu". After relocating to the United States he used the name "Ashley Montagu".

Montagu, who became a naturalized American citizen in 1940, taught and lectured at Harvard, Princeton, Rutgers, the University of California, Santa Barbara, and New York University. Forced out of his Rutgers position after the McCarthy hearings, he repositioned himself as a public intellectual in the 1950s and 1960s, appearing regularly on television shows and writing for magazines and newspapers. He authored over 60 books throughout his lifetime. In 1995, the American Humanist Association named him the Humanist of the Year.

== Early life and education ==
Montagu was born Israel Ehrenberg on June 28, 1905, in London, England. He grew up in London's East End. He remembered often being subjected to antisemitic abuse when he ventured out of his own Jewish neighborhood. Montagu attended the Central Foundation Boys' School. He developed an interest in anatomy very early and as a boy was befriended by Scottish anatomist and anthropologist Arthur Keith under whom he studied informally.

In 1922, at the age of 17, he entered University College London, where he received a diploma in psychology after studying with Karl Pearson and Charles Spearman and taking anthropology courses with Grafton Elliot Smith and Charles Gabriel Seligman. He also studied at the London School of Economics, where he became one of the first students of Bronisław Malinowski. In 1931, he emigrated to the United States. At this time, he wrote a letter introducing himself to Harvard anthropologist Earnest Hooton, claiming to have been "educated at Cambridge, Oxford, London, Florence, and Columbia" and to have earned M.A. and PhD degrees. In reality, Montagu had not graduated from Cambridge or Oxford and did not yet have a PhD. He taught anatomy to dental students in the United States, and received his doctorate in 1936, when he produced a dissertation at Columbia University, Coming into being among the Australian Aborigines: A study of the procreative beliefs of the native tribes of Australia which was supervised by cultural anthropologist Ruth Benedict. He became a professor of anthropology at Rutgers University, working there from 1949 until 1955.

== Career ==
During the 1940s and 1950s, Montagu published a series of works questioning the validity of race as a biological concept, including the UNESCO "Statement on Race", and his very well known Man's Most Dangerous Myth: the Fallacy of Race. He was particularly opposed to the work of Carleton S. Coon, and the term "race". In 1952, together with William Vogt, he gave the first Alfred Korzybski Memorial Lecture, inaugurating the series.

Montagu wrote the Foreword and Bibliography of the 1955 edition of Mutual Aid: A Factor of Evolution by Petr Kropotkin, which was reprinted in 2005.

Due to disputes concerning his involvement with the UNESCO "Statement on Race", Montagu became a target for anti-communists, and, lacking tenure, was dismissed from Rutgers University and "found all other academic avenues blocked." He retired from his academic career in 1955 and moved to Princeton, New Jersey to continue his popular writing and public appearances. He became a well-known guest of Johnny Carson's The Tonight Show. He addressed his numerous published studies of the significant relationship of mother and infant to the general public. The humanizing effects of touch informed the studies of isolation-reared monkeys and adult pathological violence that is the subject of his Time-Life documentary Rock A Bye Baby (1970).

Montagu researched genital modification and mutilation of children including circumcision, FGM, and subincision and wrote in opposition to it. In 1994, James Prescott wrote the Ashley Montagu Resolution to End the Genital Mutilation of Children Worldwide: a Petition to the World Court, The Hague, named in honor of Montagu, who was one of its original signers.

Montagu was a noted critic of creationism. He edited Science and Creationism, a volume of essays by several writers, including Isaac Asimov, which refuted creationist arguments.

== Work ==
=== Statement on Race ===
Montagu was one of the ten scientists invited to serve on a UNESCO committee addressing race, later known as the Committee of Experts on Race Problems. The main purpose of the organization was to contribute to world peace and security through science and culture. The group wrote a series of Statements on Race to spread awareness that humans are all one species and that "race" is not a valid biological concept. Montagu co-authored these Statements and later published a book, Statement on Race, presenting his own views on the theme in much more detail.

The first UNESCO Statement says, "Scientists have reached general agreement in recognizing that mankind is one: that all men belong to the same species, Homo sapiens." The first statement was put in such a way that laymen would be able to understand a scientist's point of view. They worded it so that people who were not knowledgeable about the subject would understand. "Homo sapiens is made up of a number of populations, each one of which differs from the others." That states that even though there is variability in the individual's genetic heritage, all belong to a discrete species and should be treated equally.

The second Statement says that since human history is widely diverse and complex, there are many human populations that cannot be easily classified "racially". However, some anthropologists believe that mankind is classified into at least three major human races. Even though it is believed that there are many human races, it gives no support that there is one race that is superior or inferior to any of the other races.

The third Statement gives views on the biological aspect of the race question. It explains that different human groups diverged from a common stock and that is the reason for their biological differences. The third statement also goes into detail about human evolution and how important it is for H. sapiens to survive and grow.

The fourth Statement says, "All men are born free and equal both in dignity and in rights." The fourth statement says that racism stultifies development and threatens world peace. "The division of human species into 'races' is partly conventional and partly arbitrary and does not imply any hierarchy whatsoever."

=== Man's Most Dangerous Myth: The Fallacy of Race ===
One of his works, Man's Most Dangerous Myth, was written in 1942, when race was considered the determinant of people's character and intelligence. Montagu presented a unique theory for his time: "in biology race is defined as a subdivision of species which inherits physical characteristics distinguishing it from other populations of the species. In this sense there are many human 'races.' But this is not the sense in which many anthropologists, race-classifiers, and racists have used the term." He admits that in a biological sense, there is the existence of races within mankind. However, he also believes that not all of mankind can be classified. Part of his reasoning has to do with mixed origin, which has resulted in "overlapping" of physicalities. Instead of races and subspecies, he prefers the notion of mixed ethnic groups. His writing further emphasizes the complexity of our descent and rejects claims that support one race being superior when compared to others.

He says this idea or concept of race originated around the 18th century as a direct result of slavery and the slave trade. As a side effect of slavery, naturally, humanity has divided racially; this has persisted and proceeded to dominate culture. He mentions Darwin and other authors who touched on this topic. He touches on society, genetics, psychology, culture, war, democracy, eugenics, and social factors as contributors that enhance this idea of race.

Man's Most Dangerous Myth was revised into new editions six times by Montagu, the last in 1997 when he was 92 years old, and is still in print over 75 years after its initial publication.

=== The Natural Superiority of Women ===
Originally produced as a magazine article, The Natural Superiority of Women, published in 1952, was one of the major documents of second-wave feminism and the only one written by a man. Using his background as a physical anthropologist, Montagu points to the biological advantages that females of the human species have for long-term survival and their superior emotional intelligence. The book was revised five times, the last edition published shortly before his death in 1999 and still in print.

=== The Elephant Man ===
Possibly one of Montagu's least significant works was the most famous one. His biography of a deformed 19th century British man, Joseph Merrick, dubbed The Elephant Man, was published in 1971 and formed the basis of the 1980 movie directed by David Lynch.

=== One World or None ===
Montagu wrote and directed the film One World or None. Produced in 1946 by The National Committee on Atomic Information, this short documentary exposes the dangers of nuclear weapons and argues that only international cooperation and proper control of atomic energy can avoid war and guarantee the use of this force for the benefit of mankind.

== Personal life ==
Montagu married Marjorie Peakes in 1931; the couple had two daughters and one son. He died in Princeton, New Jersey on November 26, 1999.

== Legacy ==
In 2008, Australia's University of Sydney appointed Dr Stephen Juan as "Ashley Montagu Fellow for the Public Understanding of Human Sciences", a position created especially for Juan (who died in 2018).

== In popular culture ==
- Footage of Ashley Montagu talking with Charlton Heston about his character in the movie appears as a bonus in the special DVD edition of The Omega Man.
- Archive footage of him, among others (including Carl Sagan), is featured in The X-Files episode "Gethsemane".
- The saying "International law exists only in textbooks on international law," which is often attributed to Albert Einstein, was in fact said to Einstein by Montagu.

== Selected works ==
- Coming Into Being Among the Australian Aborigines, New York: E. P. Dutton & Company, 1938.
- Man's Most Dangerous Myth: The Fallacy of Race, New York: Harper, 1942.
- Adolescent Sterility, Springfield: Charles C Thomas, 1946.
- On Being Human, New York: H. Schuman, 1950.
- The Natural Superiority of Women. Macmillan. 1953.
- The Direction of Human Development: Biological and Social Bases, New York: Harper, 1955.
- Toynbee and History: Critical Essays and Reviews (editor) (1956 ed.). Boston: Extending Horizons Books. April 1956. ISBN 0-87558-026-2.. A critique of Arnold J. Toynbee's seminal A Study of History.
- Anthropology and Human Nature, Boston: P. Sargent, 1957.
- Man: His First Million Years, Cleveland: World Pub. Co., 1957.
- The Cultured Man, Cleveland: World Pub. Co., 1958.
- Human Heredity, Cleveland: World Pub. Co, 1959.
- Life Before Birth, New York: New American Library, 1964.
- The Concept of Race (editor), New York: Free Press of Glencoe, 1964.
- Up the Ivy, New York: Hawthorn Books, 1966. (published under the pseudonym Academicus Mentor)
- Man's Evolution: An Introduction to Physical Anthropology, (co-authored with C. Loring Brace), New York: Macmillan, 1965. Second edition published as Human Evolution: An Introduction to Biological Anthropology, New York: Macmillan, 1977, ISBN 0-02313-190-X.
- The Anatomy of Swearing, New York: Macmillan, 1967.
- The Prevalence of Nonsense, (co-authored with Edward Darling), New York, Harper and Rowe, 1967.
- Man and Aggression, New York: Oxford University Press, 1968.
- Touching: The Human Significance of the Skin. Columbia University Press. 1971. ISBN 0-231-03488-1. First publication, 224 pages, in tribute to Howard Gossage. Preface by the author, signed in Princeton on 8. February 1971. Second commercial publication, Harper & Row, 1978, 384 pages. ISBN 978-0-06-012979-8. Third edition, William Morrow Paperback, 1986, 512 pages. ISBN 978-0060960285
- The Elephant Man: A Study in Human Dignity, New York: Outerbridge and Dienstfrey, 1971.
- Culture and Human Development, Englewood Cliffs, N.J.: Prentice-Hall, 1974, ISBN 0-13195-578-0.
- Race and IQ (editor), New York: Oxford University Press, 1975.
- The Nature of Human Aggression, New York: Oxford University Press, 1976.
- Learning Non-Aggression: The Experience of Non-Literate Societies (editor), New York: Oxford University Press, 1978, ISBN 0-19502-342-0
- The Human Connection (co-authored with Floyd W. Matson), New York: McGraw-Hill, 1979, ISBN 0-07042-840-9.
- Growing Young, New York: McGraw-Hill, 1981. Second edition, Westport, Connecticut: Bergin & Garvey, 1989, ISBN 0-89789-166-X
- Science and Creationism, Oxford; New York: Oxford University Press, 1984, ISBN 0-195-03252-7. Features the writing of Roger Lewin, Kenneth R. Miller, Robert Root-Bernstein, George M. Marsden, Stephen Jay Gould, Gunther S. Stent, Kenneth E. Boulding, Garrett Hardin, Laurie R. Godfrey, Isaac Asimov, Sidney W. Fox, L. Beverly Halstead, Roger J. Cuffey, Roy A. Gallant, Robert M. May, Michael Ruse, William R. Overton, and Sidney Ratner.
- Living and Loving (edited with notes by Tsuyoshi Amemiya and Kazuo Takeno), Tokyo: Kinseido, 1986, ISBN 4-76470-470-6.
- The Peace of The World, Tokyo: Kenkyusha, 1987, ISBN 4-32742-050-6.
- The Dehumanization of Man (co-author with Floyd Matson), New York: McGraw-Hill, 1983.
- Nude and Natural, vol. 12, The Naturists, 1992
- Man's Most Dangerous Myth: The Fallacy of Race, 6th edition. Walnut Creek CA: AltaMira Press, 1997
- The Natural Superiority of Women, 5th edition. Walnut Creek CA: AltaMira Press. 1999.
