= Ashley Montagu Resolution =

The Ashley Montagu Resolution refers to the petition to the World Court to end the genital modification and mutilation of children worldwide.

The resolution was authored by James W. Prescott, a developmental psychologist. Signatories include original endorsers include doctors, nurses, humanists, journalists, and activists including NOCIRC founder and RN, Marilyn Milos. Prominent signatories include Nobel Laureate in Physiology and Medicine Francis Crick and polio vaccine inventor Jonas Salk. The petition has been signed by at least two Nobel Prize winners.

== Original signatories ==
- Sami Aldeeb
- Jeannine Parvati Baker
- Norman L Cohen
- Dr. Francis Crick
- Dr. James DeMeo
- Jed Diamond
- Ralph Ginzburg
- Dr. John Hardebeck
- Fredric Hayward
- Fran P. Hosken
- Dr. Lester A Kirkendall
- Dr. Paul Kurtz
- Dr. Gerald Larue
- Hanny Lightfoot-Klein
- Linda Massie
- Marilyn Fayre Milos
- Dr. Asha Mohamud
- Dr. Ashley Montagu
- Miriam Pollack
- Dr. James W. Prescott (Author)
- Moshe Rothenberg
- Dr. Jonas Salk
- Dr. Thomas Szasz
- Dr. Anastasios Zavales

== See also ==
- Ashley Montagu
- Genital integrity
- Female genital mutilation
- Circumcision controversies
