= Mary Morain =

Mary Stone Dewing Morain (1911 – June 14, 1999) was an American therapist, social reformer, and prominent secular humanist, the co-author, with her husband Lloyd Morain, of Humanism As The Next Step.

Mary Stone Dewing was born in Cambridge, Massachusetts, the eldest of three children; her parents were teachers at Simmons College. In 1926 she traveled with her family to England, Europe and Egypt. She was thought to be a sickly child and was sent to Florida to study for a time, before returning to Simmons College as a social work student. She also worked part-time in Italian and Irish immigrant communities in the South End of Boston, and in the mid-1930s received an M.A. degree from the University of Chicago.

In 1938, she moved to Hollywood to work with Donald McLean as one of his staff of therapists working under the principles of General Semantics. While there she met Lloyd Morain. During World War II she worked as a teacher and social worker in New York City, and they married after Lloyd's return from service in Europe in 1946. After working part-time for the New England Home for Little Wanderers, an institution that cared for vulnerable mothers, she became a volunteer for Planned Parenthood, later becoming president of the Planned Parenthood Association in Boston, as well as the League of Women Voters. She became a leading member of Planned Parenthood, touring and lecturing on birth control around the world, often in the company of Margaret Sanger. She and her husband were also founding Directors of the International Humanist and Ethical Union, established in 1952.

The couple returned to California, to live in San Francisco, and co-wrote Humanism As The Next Step (1954). As well as continuing to support Planned Parenthood, Mary Morain was active in Altrusa and in adult literacy and tree planting initiatives in San Francisco. In the 1970s she and her husband were both elected as Fellows of the World Academy of Art and Science and were both signers of the Humanist Manifesto II in 1973. She compiled and edited four books on general semantics, served as President of the International Society for General Semantics, and revised Humanism as the Next Step. She and her husband were jointly named "Humanists of the Year" by the American Humanist Association in 1994. In accepting that award she said:

Most systems of basic beliefs - most life stances - give some emphasis to helping others rather than our individual selves. Believing that we exist only in a single world, the natural world that we share with other living creatures, and that we have no special first-class tickets that allow for travel to continuous existence in other spheres at the end of our journey in this life. In our human distresses, we have only each other to turn to for help.

She died in 1999, after contracting pneumonia.
