= Fran Hosken =

American designer (1920–2006)

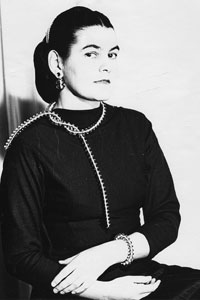
Fran Hosken ca. 1950

Fran P. Hosken (1920 in Vienna Austria – 2 February 2006) was an American designer, writer, feminist, and social activist. She founded the Women's International Network in 1975, and published a quarterly journal on women's health issues that became known, in particular, for its research into female genital mutilation (FGM).

== Biography ==
Hosken was born as Franziska Porges in Vienna to a prominent Jewish family, where her father Otto Porges was a physician from Bohemia (Brandys nad Labem, Czech Republic), and emigrated with her family to the United States in 1938. She attended Smith College, and in 1944 obtained a master's degree from the Harvard Graduate School of Design, one of the first women to do so. She joined the Coast Guard during the Second World War, working in communications. She married James Hosken in 1947, and founded Hosken, Inc in 1947. They had three children, and divorced in 1962.

== Work ==
Hosken founded Hosken, Inc. with her husband James Hosken in 1947. One of her first projects, a colorful stacking stool, became a commercial and critical success. Their work was distributed by Knoll, Raymor, and Macy's, and was shown at the Chicago Merchandise Mart and the Milan Triennale. Despite early successes, the company closed in 1951.

For many years she published the Women's International Network NEWS (WIN NEWS) which was "BY, FOR & ABOUT WOMEN - a world-wide open participatory communication system by, for and about women of all backgrounds, beliefs, nationalities and age groups." Win News regularly analyzed and critiqued such global issues as the policies of the IMF and the World Bank and their often deleterious effect on women, especially the women of Asia and Africa. She also created and published The CHILDBIRTH PICTURE BOOK(CBPB): A Picture Story of Reproduction from a Woman's View. The Childbirth Picture Book provided basic biological information on reproductive health especially important to young women all over the world and has been "tremendously useful regardless of language or literacy and for women of all ethnic backgrounds; and is highly recommended for family planning education".

It is said that Fran Hosten coined the term Female Genital Mutilation (FGM) and put the issue of FGM on the United Nations agenda. Her report on FGM, The Hosken Report: Genital and Sexual Mutilation of Females (1979), was influential in persuading the international community, including the World Health Organization, to make efforts to end the practice. As a pioneer in speaking out against the practice of Female Genital Mutilation, Ms. Hosken courageously withstood often vicious criticism in defense of the women being subjected to these practices. Hosken was also against circumcision and signed the Ashley Montagu Resolution which called for the end of all sexual mutilations of children including penile subincision and ritual bloodletting pin-pricks.

In 1987, Hosken received the Humanist Heronie Award from the American Humanist Association.

== Selected works ==
- The Language of Cities: A Visual Introduction to the Form and Function of the City. Schenkman Pub. Co, 1972.
- Urban development and Housing in Africa. Hosken, 1973.
- The Kathmandu Valley Towns: A Record of Life and Change in Nepal. Weatherhill, 1974.
- The Hosken Report: Genital and Sexual Mutilation of Females. Women's International Network News, 1979.
- Female Sexual Mutilations: The facts and Proposals for Action. Women's International Network News, 1980.
- "Towards a Definition of Women's Rights," Human Rights Quarterly, vol 3, issue 2, May 1981.
- The Childbirth Picture Book: A Picture Story of Reproduction from a Woman's View. Women's International Network News, 1989.
- Stop Female Genital Mutilation. Women's International Network News, 1995.
