= Clarence Luther Herrick =

American geologist, neurologist, and university president

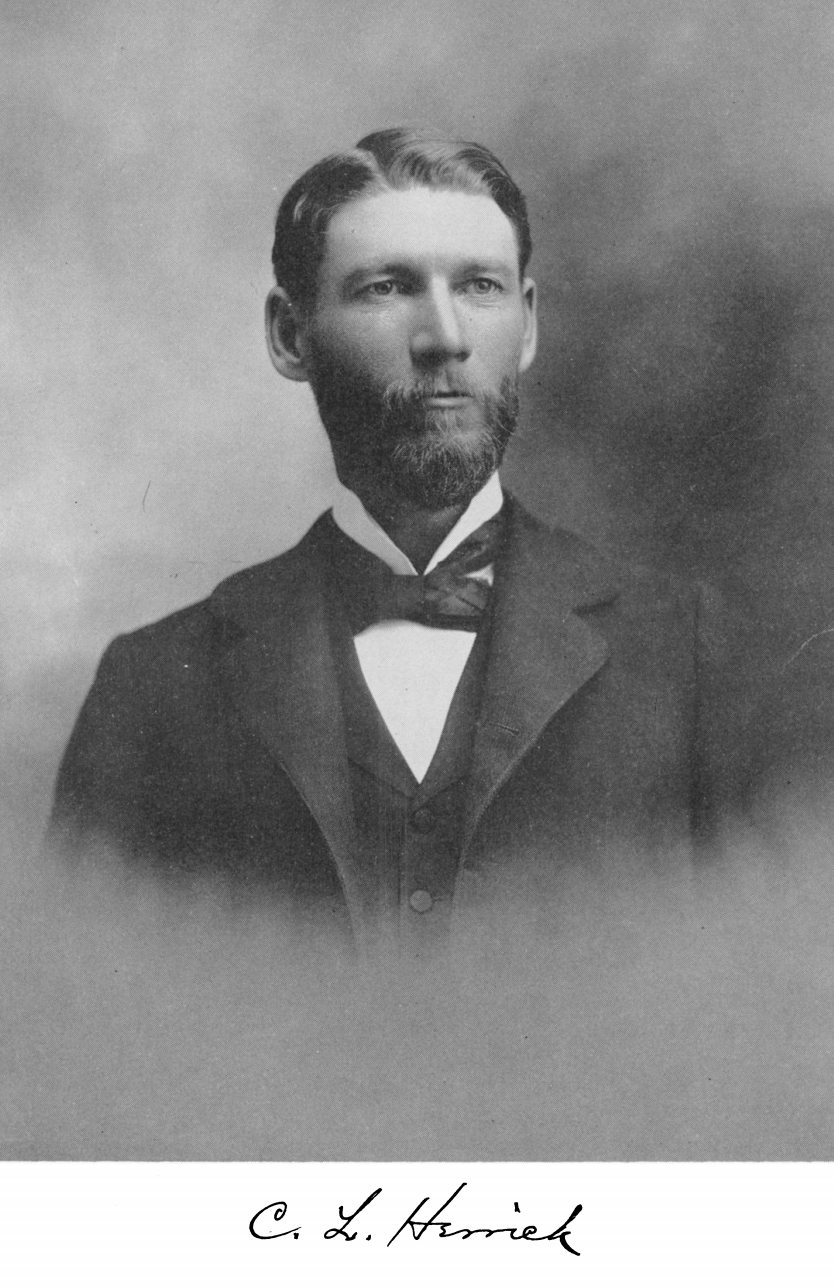
- Born: June 21, 1858
- Died: September 15, 1904 (aged 46)
- Occupations: Geologist and neurologist
- Known for: Second president of University of New Mexico

Clarence Luther Herrick (June 21, 1858 – September 15, 1904) was a geologist and comparative neurologist who served as the second president of the University of New Mexico.

== Early life ==
Clarence Luther Herrick was born in Minneapolis, Minnesota, on June 21, 1858. He was the oldest of four sons born to Henry Nathan Herrick and Anna Strickler. His younger brother, Charles Judson Herrick, was also a neurologist. Clarence Herrick married Alice Keith, also of Minneapolis, on June 25, 1883. They had a son and two daughters. Herrick died in Socorro, New Mexico, on September 15, 1904.

== Career ==
After graduating from high school in Minneapolis in 1874, he attended the University of Minnesota and received a bachelor's degree with high honors in 1880. He also received his master's degree and Ph.D. from University of Minnesota in 1885 and 1898 respectively. Beginning in 1876, he worked on the Natural History Survey of Minnesota and resulting in the publication of Mammals of Minnesota in 1892. Herrick conducted research at the University of Leipzig from 1891 to 1892. He held a professorship at Denison University from 1884 to 1889 and 1892–1894 with interruption as professor of zoology at University of Cincinnati from 1889 to 1891 and University of Chicago from 1891 to 1892. While at the University of Cincinnati, he mentored zoologist Charles Henry Turner. He founded the Bulletin of the Scientific Laboratories of Denison University in 1885 and the Journal of Comparative Neurology (also known as the Journal of Comparative Neurology and Psychology in the early 1900s) in 1891.

Developing tuberculosis in December 1893, Herrick and his family moved to Albuquerque, New Mexico in July 1894 and later purchased a ranch in Socorro County. Herrick became a US Deputy Mineral Surveyor in 1896, then president of the University of New Mexico in July 1897. During his presidency, the University of New Mexico received its first large donation, $10,000, by Mrs. Walter Hadley, for the construction of a laboratory for bacteriological research. This laboratory was known as the Walter C. Hadley Laboratory and Science Hall and was the second building completed on the University of New Mexico campus on February 1, 1900. Due to his health, he resigned from the president position in June 1901. He went on to manage the Socorro Gold Mining Company's Cat Mountain mine from 1902 to 1903. Herrick died in Socorro, New Mexico in 1904.

== Honors ==
The fossil alga genus Herrickiceras was named for Herrick in recognition of his pioneering geological work in New Mexico.

== Selected works ==
- Mammals of Minnesota (1892)
- Ph.D. Dissertation - A Theory of Somatic Equilibrium with Illustrations of a Possible Mechanism Therefor in the Skin (1898)

== Additional resources ==
- Windle WF. (1975). Clarence Luther Herrick and the beginning of neuroscience in America. Experimental Neurology, 49(1), 1–10.
