= Lloyd Morain =

American humanist (1917–2010)

Lloyd L. Morain
- Born: 2 April 1917; Pomona, California, United States
- Died: 13 July 2010 (aged 93); Carmel, California
- Occupations: Businessman, philanthropist, writer, environmentalist, art collector, film producer, secular humanist

Lloyd L. Morain (2 April 1917 – 13 July 2010) was an American businessman, philanthropist, writer, environmentalist, art collector and film producer, who uniquely served two terms as President of the American Humanist Association (AHA).

== Life and career ==
He was born in Pomona, California, the youngest of four children of Jesse and Adelheide Gutheil Morain, and grew up living in a shack in a northern California lumber town where his father worked as a minister. His father later practiced law, and his mother became a teacher at UCLA.

In his teens, he won an essay-writing competition, as a result of which he gained a scholarship to UCLA. After graduating, he worked in the movie industry in Los Angeles, his friend Irving Wallace engaging him as psychological consultant and palmist for film stars such as Marlene Dietrich, Hedy Lamarr, and Charles Boyer. He became president of the Los Angeles Society for General Semantics, through which he met Mary Stone Dewing; they married in 1946.

During World War II he served in the US Army Air Corps, and at the end of the war was involved in setting up schools in Europe for the many servicemen experiencing long delays before their return home. While with the USAAC in Britain he also acted as a field representative for the American Humanist Association. Through his discussions with leading secular humanists in Britain, Belgium, the Netherlands, and the United States, he played a leading role in establishing the International Humanist and Ethical Union, formed in 1952. He and his wife were founding Directors of the IHEU.

After his return to the US, he started a career in the mining and utilities industries, initially as a result of being appointed as an industrial psychologist with U.S. Steel. From 1950, he worked for the Illinois Gas Company, and served as its President from 1971 to 1988. He also invested in mining activities in Colorado.

He served his first term as President of the American Humanist Association from 1951 to 1955. At the same time, he supported his wife's work as a supporter of global initiatives on planned parenthood. In 1954, the couple co-authored Humanism as the Next Step: an introduction for liberal Protestants, Catholics, and Jews, which has since been republished in several later editions, most recently in 2007. Both were later elected as Fellows of the World Academy of Art and Science. Lloyd Morain received the Humanist Merit Award in 1956. He became involved in the movie industry again in the late 1950s, producing the movie Flight, based on John Steinbeck's short story, which won a prize at the Cannes Film Festival.

Between 1969 and 1972 he served an unprecedented second term as President of the American Humanist Association, and was awarded the Humanist Distinguished Service Award in 1972. He was editor of the Humanist Magazine between 1979 and 1990, and wrote for the magazine on issues as diverse as general semantics, international cooperation, affordable housing, and humanism in developing countries. He was a major financial donor to the AHA, and also served on the board of the Planned Parenthood Federation of America.

He researched and wrote a book on working drifters, The Human Cougar, published in 1976. He saw the drifters, who he had first encountered in his youth, as epitomizing the American ideal of personal independence, and often rode boxcars and camped with them while gathering their stories. In the 1980s, he and his wife funded a refuge for migrant workers in Salinas. He also worked closely with prison governors on the rehabilitation of prisoners through finding them employment opportunities.

In the 1990s, he was given the Philanthropist of the Year award for the Monterey Peninsula, and in 1994 he and his wife were jointly honored by the American Humanist Association as Humanists of the Year. He helped his friend and business partner Michael McOmber establish a school for troubled adolescent boys, Bridges Academy, in Bend, Oregon in 1997. He supported local performers through theatre scholarships, and purchased a large area at Rancho San Carlos near his home in Carmel, California, to protect the redwoods from logging. In 2003 he was one of the signers of the Humanist Manifesto. He also sponsored the environmentalist film, Fuel, in 2008.

He was actively involved in the international organisation of arm wrestling as a sporting activity, and competed for the US in the sport at the Goodwill Games in Moscow in 1988. He had an extensive collection of sculptures, carvings, paintings and furniture, acquired through his worldwide travels, particularly in Africa, Asia, and the Pacific. With McOmber, he established a museum housing his collection in Bend, Oregon.

He wrote:

Laws, governments, and other institutions exist for the service of men and women, and are justifiable only as they contribute to human well-being. The supreme value is the individual human being. Each person, of whatever race or condition, merits equal concern and opportunity.

He was one of the signatories of the agreement to convene a convention for drafting a world constitution. As a result, for the first time in human history, a World Constituent Assembly convened to draft and adopt the Constitution for the Federation of Earth.

== Death ==
His wife Mary died in 1999. Lloyd Morain died in Carmel in 2010 at the age of 93.

== Bibliography ==
- Humanism as the Next Step (with Mary Morain, 1954)
- The Human Cougar (1976)
