= Roy Speckhardt =

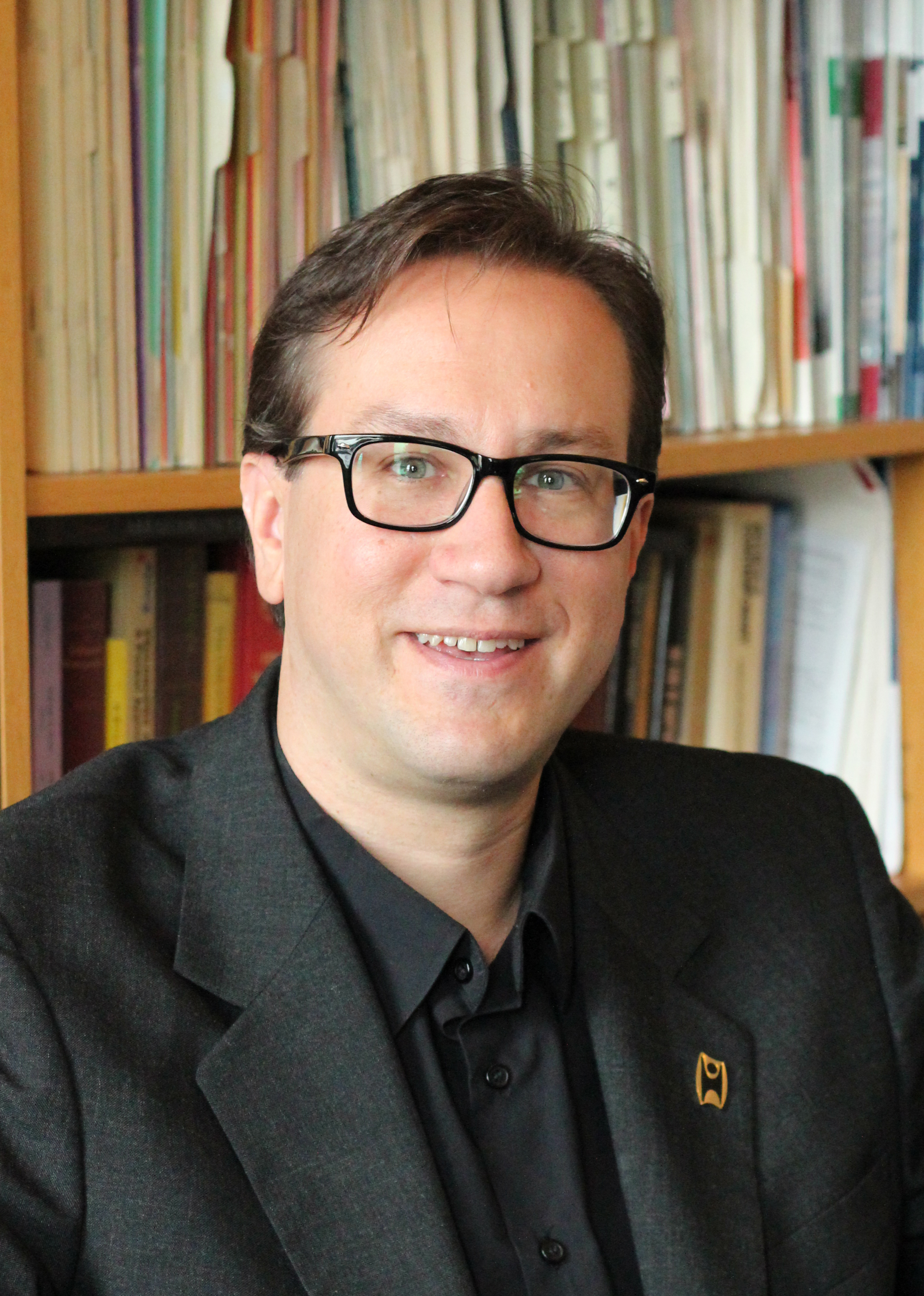
- Roy Speckhardt, 2012
- Born: January 24, 1973 (age 53); Carmel, New York
- Occupation: Chief Development Officer for VoteRiders Voice of Roy Speckhardt

Roy Speckhardt (born January 24, 1973, in Carmel, New York) is an American writer and the Development Director for VoteRiders. He is also the President of the Humanist Foundation, which is the endowment fund for the for of the American Humanist Association, where he served previously for 16 years as executive director, a non-profit civil liberties organization in Washington, D.C. In April 2021, he authored Justice-Centered Humanism via Pitchstone Press and in July 2015, he authored Creating Change Through Humanism via Humanist Press.

== Biography ==
Speckhardt earned a Bachelor of Arts in sociology from Mary Washington College and a Master of Business Administration from George Mason University.

Early in his career, Speckhardt was a fundraiser for various causes, including AIDS research and wildlife conservation, and worked on the "World Difference Campaign" of the Anti-Defamation League. He worked for The Interfaith Alliance from 1995 to 2001 as deputy director in charge of staff. Speckhardt worked as the director of membership and programs of the American Humanist Association for four years, and executive director for sixteen. The American Humanist Association is the oldest and one of the largest groups of humanists and atheists in the United States.

== Challenges to "Pledge of Allegiance" ==
In 2013 Speckhardt argued that the phrase "under God" in the Pledge of Allegiance violates the Equal Protection Amendment of the Massachusetts Constitution. In May 2014 the Supreme Judicial Court of Massachusetts ruled that the pledge was a "fundamentally patriotic exercise, not a religious one".

In 2014, the AHA likewise brought suit against the state of New Jersey. In February 2015 a New Jersey Superior Court Judge dismissed a lawsuit challenging the Pledge of Allegiance, ruling that "...the Pledge of Allegiance does not violate the rights of those who don't believe in God and does not have to be removed from the patriotic message."
