= Marian Hillar =

American theologian

Marian Hillar is an American philosopher, theologian, linguist, and scientist. He is a recognized authority on Michael Servetus and together with classicist and political theorist, C. A. Hoffman, translated the major works of Michael Servetus from Latin into English for the first time. He identified the radical search for truth and the right for freedom of conscience as Servetus' main legacies, rather than his theology and scientific discovery. He studied the influence of Servetus in the world and the development and ideas of the Socinian movement in the 16th and 17th centuries, precursors of the Enlightenment and modern era. He does research in the history of ideas and is author of numerous studies in the history of philosophy, ethics, theological doctrines, and Radical Reformation.

== Biography ==
Marian Hillar was born in 1938 in Bydgoszcz (present-day Poland) in an old family claiming its roots in 14th-century Holland. He received classical education in highly selective elementary and secondary schools with emphasis on science and languages. He earned his degrees at the Medical University of Gdansk and studied at the Jagiellonian University and at Sorbonne. He was invited in 1969 to do research at Baylor College of Medicine in Houston. He became a US citizen in 1977. He did research and taught in Europe at the Medical University of Gdansk and the Università degli studi di Camerino, and in the USA at the Baylor College of Medicine and the Ponce School of Medicine. He is currently professor of philosophy and religious studies, and he is director of the Center for Philosophy and Socinian Studies which he founded in 1986.

== History of philosophy and religion ==
Marian Hillar has published studies on the philosophy of Hippocratic medicine; Greek philosophy of science and the origin of science; ancient Greek philosophy; liberation theology; the New Testament, Dead Sea Scrolls, early Christian writers, and the origin of Christianity; Philo of Alexandria, Numenius, early church fathers and development of the theory of logos and of the Trinity; studies in ethics- Stoics, Thomas Aquinas, Kant; Radical Reformation and development of antitrinitarian doctrines, Socinians; development of modern ideas on freedom of conscience and church-state separation.

== Development of the theory of logos and of the Trinity ==
Hillar's major theological work is demonstrating how the doctrine of the Trinity was developed from various sources through the evolution of the Jewish messianic expectations which underwent changes during centuries. He identified as its sources the Greek philosophical concept of the Logos, Middle Platonic philosophical ideas, especially of Numenius and Philo of Alexandria, and the Egyptian religious ideas about the trinity of divinity.

== Editorship ==
Hillar is founder and was editor-in-chief (1992-2012) of the Essays in the Philosophy of Humanism, a scholarly journal published yearly since 1992 by the Humanists of Houston. In 2005, the American Humanist Association, Washington, D.C., agreed to assume the duties of publishing the journal under its aegis.

== Select publications ==
- Marian Hillar, "Energetics and Kinetic Mechanisms of Enzyme Function", pp. 685, Whittier Publications, Lido Beach, New York, 1994.
- Marian Hillar, "The Case of Michael Servetus (1511-1553) - The Turning Point in the Struggle for Freedom of Conscience," pp. 444, Edwin Mellen Press, Lewiston N.Y., 1997; second printing in 1999.
- Marian Hillar with Claire S. Allen, “Michael Servetus: Intellectual Giant, Humanist, and Martyr,” pp. 274+xxvii. (Lanham, New York, Oxford: University Press of America, 2002).
- Marian Hillar, and Christopher A. Hoffman, translators: “The Restoration of Christianity. An English Translation of Christianismi restitutio, 1553, by Michael Servetus (1511-1553). Translated by Christopher A. Hoffman and Marian Hillar,” (Lewiston, NY; Queenston, Ont., Canada; Lampeter, Wales, UK: Edwin Mellen Press, 2007).
- Marian Hillar, and Christopher A. Hoffman, translators: “Treatise on Faith and Justice of Christ’s Kingdom by Michael Servetus. Selected and Translated from Christianismi restitutio by Christopher A. Hoffman and Marian Hillar,” (Lewiston, NY; Queenston, Ont., Canada; Lampeter, Wales, UK: Edwin Mellen Press, 2008).
- Marian Hillar, and Christopher A. Hoffman, translators: “Treatise Concerning the Supernatural Regeneration and the Kingdom of the Antichrist by Michael Servetus. Selected and Translated from Christianismi restitutio by Christopher A. Hoffman and Marian Hillar,” (Lewiston, NY; Queenston, Ont., Canada; Lampeter, Wales, UK: Edwin Mellen Press, 2008).
- Marian Hillar, and Christopher A. Hoffman, translators: “Thirty Letters to Calvin & Sixty Signs of the Antichrist by Michael Servetus.” Translated from Christianismi restitutio by Christopher A. Hoffman and Marian Hillar (Lewiston, NY; Queenston, Ont., Canada; Lampeter, Wales, UK: Edwin Mellen Press, 2010). Pp. 175 + lxxxvi.
- Marian Hillar, and Christopher A. Hoffman, translators: “Regarding the Mystery of the Trinity and the Teaching of the Ancients to Philip Melanchthon and His Colleagues by Michael Servetus." (Lewiston, NY; Queenston, Ont., Canada; Wales, UK: Edwin Mellen Press, 2015), 103 pp + lii.
- Juan Naya and Marian Hillar, eds., “Michael Servetus, Heartfelt: Proceedings of the International Servetus Congress, Barcelona, 20–21 October 2006,” (Lanham, MD and Plymouth UK: University Press of America, 2011). 430 pp.
- Marian Hillar, "From Logos to Trinity: The Evolution of Religious Beliefs from Pythagoras to Tertullian," pp. 332, Cambridge University Press, 2012.
- Marian Hillar, “The Historical Development Toward a Non-Theistic Humanistic Ethics: Essays from the Ancient Stoics to Modern Science.” (Lewiston, NY; Queenston, Ont., Canada; Lampeter, Wales, UK: Edwin Mellen Press, 2015), 278 pp + lxii.

== See also ==
- American philosophy
- List of American philosophers
