= William F. Windle =

American anatomist and neurologist (1898–1985)

William Frederick Windle (October 10, 1898, Huntington, Indiana – February 20, 1985, Granville, Ohio) was an American anatomist and experimental neurologist.

== Biography ==
Windle graduated in 1921 with a B.S. from Denison University. At Northwestern University Medical School (now named Feinberg School of Medicine), he graduated with an M.S. in 1923 and a Ph.D. in anatomy in 1926. His Ph.D. thesis Studies on the trigeminal nerve with particular reference to the pathway for painful afferent impulses was supervised by S. Walter Ranson (1880–1942).

At Northwestern University School of Medicine, Windle was appointed assistant professor of anatomy in 1926, associate professor in 1929, and professor of microscopic anatomy in 1935. A research stay at the University of Cambridge in England followed from 1935 to 1936. From 1942 to 1946 Windle was professor of neurology at Northwestern University Medical School and director of the medical school's neurological institute. In the anatomy department of the University of Washington School of Medicine, he was from 1946 to 1947 a professor and chair of the department. In the anatomy department of the University of Pennsylvania School of Medicine (now named the Perelman School of Medicine at the University of Pennsylvania), he was from 1947 to 1951 a professor and head of the department. From 1951 to 1954 he worked as a scientific manager in the Baxter Laboratories in Morton Grove, Illinois.

From 1954 to 1960 he was, after appointment by Seymour S. Kety, the head of the laboratory for neuroanatomical studies at the National Institute of Neurological Diseases and Blindnes (NINDB, later renamed the National Institute of Neurological Disorders and Stroke) of the National Institutes of Health (NIH) in Bethesda, Maryland. Windle was from 1960 to 1961 the NINDB's deputy director and from 1961 to 1963 the head of the NINDB's Laboratory of Perinatal Physiology. From 1963 until his retirement in 1971, he worked at the New York University Medical Center (now named NYU Langone Health). There Windle was a research professor and the director of research at the medical center's institute for rehabilitative medicine. From 1971 to 1985 he was a research professor at Denison University. He was a guest professor at various institutions throughout his career.

Beginning in 1957, Windle and collaborators worked to further develop experimental neurological research in a colony of rhesus monkeys located at Cayo Santiago Field Station. The monkey colony was started in 1938. The island Cayo Santiago is owned by the Universidad de Puerto Rico, and researchers are the only visitors allowed.

In 1959 Windle was one of the founders of the journal Experimental Neurology, of which he remained editor-in-chief until 1975. His doctoral students include Sanford Palay.

In 1923 William F. Windle married Ella Grace Howell. They had two children and three grandchildren.

== Research ==
Windle was a pioneer of physiological research in the developmental biology of embryos and newborn infants. He contributed important insights into the etiology and pathogenesis of cerebral palsy and other forms of infantile brain damage. By experimental neurology on kittens, guinea pigs, and monkeys, he and his colleagues created a basis for prevention and treatment of childbirth asphyxia in newborns. His research also increased scientific understanding of kernicterus.

== Awards and history ==
- 1927 Fellow of the American Association for the Advancement of Science
- 1945 Harvey Lecturer at the New York Academy of Medicine
- 1947 honorary Sc.D. from Denison University
- 1962 honorary professor at the Universidad de Puerto Rico
- 1968 Albert Lasker Award for Basic Medical Research

== Selected publications ==
=== Articles ===
- Windle, William F. (1926). "The distribution and probable significance of unmyelinated nerve fibers in the trigeminal nerve of the cat". Journal of Comparative Neurology. 41: 453–477. doi:10.1002/cne.900410116. S2CID 83645069. (See trigeminal nerve.)
- Windle, W.F.; Becker, R.F. (1943). "Asphyxia neonatorum". American Journal of Obstetrics and Gynecology. 45 (2): 183–200. doi:10.1016/S0002-9378(43)90778-1.
- Windle, William F.; Groat, Richard A. (1945). "Disappearance of nerve cells after concussion". The Anatomical Record. 93 (2): 201–209. doi:10.1002/ar.1090930210. PMID 21003323. S2CID 12703187.
- Windle, William F. (1956). "Regeneration of Axons in the Vertebrate Central Nervous System". Physiological Reviews. 36 (4): 427–440. doi:10.1152/physrev.1956.36.4.427. PMID 13370344.
- Ranck, James B.; Windle, William F. (1959). "Brain damage in the monkey, Macaca mulatta, by asphyxia neonatorum". Experimental Neurology. 1 (2): 130–154. doi:10.1016/0014-4886(59)90032-9. PMID 13663899.
- Puchala, Elizabeth; Windle, William F. (1977). "The possibility of structural and functional restitution after spinal cord injury. A review". Experimental Neurology. 55 (1): 1–42. doi:10.1016/0014-4886(77)90155-8. PMID 849750. S2CID 33132833.

=== Books and monographs ===
- Physiology of the Fetus. 1942. ASIN B00005XOQU.
- with José F. Nonidez: Textbook of histology. 1949.
  - 5th edition 1976 ISBN 978-0-07-070977-5
- with Robert F. Pitts: Asphyxia neonatorum: Its relation to the fetal blood, circulation and respiration and its effects upon the brain. 1950. ISBN 1258344998
- Biology of neuroglia. 1958. ASIN B09SHHXW7H.
- as editor with E. Harold Hinman: Neurological and Psychological Deficits of Asphyxia Neonatorum. 1958. ASIN B000IA6HEK.
- Windle, William Frederick (1980). The Spinal Cord and Its Reaction to Traumatic Injury: Anatomy, Physiology, Pharmacology, Therapeutics. M. Dekker. ISBN 0-8247-6688-1.
- Windle, William Frederick (1979). The Pioneering Role of Clarence Luther Herrick in American Neuroscience. Exposition Press. ISBN 0-6824-9340-6. (See Clarence Luther Herrick.)
