= National Day of Prayer Task Force =

US non-profit organization

- Abbreviation: NDP Task Force
- Formation: 1983
- Type: Non-profit organization
- Purpose: Organizes, coordinates, and presides over Evangelical Christian religious observances each year on the National Day of Prayer
- Headquarters: Colorado Springs, United States
- Leader: Kathy Branzell
- Parent organization: Christian National Prayer Committee

The National Day of Prayer Task Force (NDP Task Force) is an American evangelical conservative Christian non-profit organization which organizes, coordinates, and presides over Evangelical Christian religious observances each year on the National Day of Prayer.

Shirley Dobson, whose husband is James Dobson, an evangelical conservative Christian author and the founder of the politically conservative evangelical Christian organization Focus on the Family, was Chairwoman of the NDP Task Force from 1991 to 2016. The 2019 President, that took over the role of Chairman of the NDP Task Force is Kathy Branzell. The Task Force's theme for the 2013 Annual Observance was "Pray for America" and is based on the Biblical reference in Matthew 12:21, which states, "In his name the nations will put their hope."

The headquarters of the NDP Task Force is in Colorado Springs, Colorado. Offices were located at Focus on the Family until 2009. The website of the NDP Task Force states that "its business affairs remained separate" from those of Focus on the Family, but also that "between 1990 and 1993, Focus on the Family did provide grants in support of the NDP Task Force" and that "Focus on the Family was compensated for services rendered."

== Purpose and mission ==
In 2010, The National Day of Prayer Task Force's stated mission was to "communicate with every individual the need for personal repentance and prayer, mobilizing the Christian community to intercede for America and its leadership in the seven centers of power: government, military, media, business, education, church and family."

In 2011, the stated mission and purpose of the NDP Task Force were modified. Currently, the NDP Task Force's stated mission is "to mobilize prayer in America and to encourage personal repentance and righteousness in the culture."

The NDP Task Force's current "vision", according to their website, is "to mobilize and encourage personal and corporate prayer, regardless of current issues and positions; preserve America's Christian heritage and defend the religious freedoms granted by the Constitution; emphasize prayer for America and its leadership in the seven centers of power: Government, Military, Media, Business, Education, Church and Family; foster unity within the Christian Church".

== History ==
Founded in 1983, the NDP Task Force is a non-profit subsidiary of the evangelical Christian National Prayer Committee, which was founded in 1979 by Mrs. Vonette Bright, co-founder of the evangelical Christian organization Campus Crusade for Christ International.

While the NDP Task Force coordinates thousands of local events throughout the nation on the National Day of Prayer, the most prominent event is the National Observance in Washington D.C.

During each year of the George W. Bush Administration, events coordinated with the NDP Task Force were held in the White House. Presidents Ronald Reagan and George H. W. Bush each held only one NDP Task Force-coordinated religious ceremony on a National Day of Prayer during their tenures. Presidents Bill Clinton and Barack Obama held informal prayer meetings but did not participate in NDP Task Force events.

== Controversy ==
Critics have charged that the NDP Task Force used its political power to "hijack" the National Day of Prayer to exclude all faiths except traditional Christians, and that this violates the Establishment Clause of the First Amendment of the U.S. Constitution.

Aseem Shukla, co-founder of the Hindu American Foundation stated, "In 2005, the Hindu American Foundation was repulsed by Shirley Dobson's National Day of Prayer Task Force, when it sought to join celebrations throughout the country. This same task force joined the likes of Focus on Family and others, that enjoyed official status and the aura of government sanction."

During the George W. Bush administration, the NDP Task Force excluded members of the Church of Jesus Christ of Latter-day Saints from active participation in National Day of Prayer events, even in the state of Utah where Mormons make up 70% of the state's population. In 2004, this led an ecumenical group of 40 faiths to boycott the Task Force-sponsored event in the Utah Valley.
