= James W. Prescott =

American developmental psychologist (born 1934)

James W. Prescott (January 21, 1934 – August 8, 2025) was an American developmental psychologist, whose research focused on the origins of violence, particularly as it relates to a lack of mother-child bonding.

Prescott was a health scientist administrator at the National Institute of Child Health and Human Development (NICHD), one of the Institutes of the US National Institutes of Health (NIH) from 1966 to 1980. He created and directed the Developmental Behavioral Biology Program at the NICHD where he initiated NICHD-supported research programs to study the relationship between mother-child bonding and the development of social abilities in adult life. Inspired by Harry Harlow's famous experiments on rhesus monkeys, which established a link between neurotic behavior and isolation from a care-giving mother, Prescott further proposed that a key component to development comes from the somesthetic processes (body touch) and vestibular-cerebellar processes (body movement) induced by mother-child interactions, and that deprivation of this stimulation causes brain abnormalities. By analogy to the neurotic behavior in monkeys, he suggested that these developmental abnormalities are a major cause of adult violence amongst humans.

Prescott also served as assistant head of the Psychology Branch of the Office of Naval Research (1963 to 1966) and as president of the Maryland Psychological Association (1970 to 1971). In 1973 he was one of the signers of the Humanist Manifesto.

Prescott's findings about origins of child abuse was innovative, groundbreaking, and controversial. In 1978, Hustler Magazine published an article by Prescott with shocking photos of actual abused children. Dr. Prescott supported this publication of his work in order to reach an audience outside of the scientific community. For this, NICHD fired Prescott, and he protested in front of the U.S. Senate and House Appropriations Committee. Prescott testified that "we are producing more criminals . . . 'by the manner in which we are raising our children ... than we will be able to house in all the prisons that we can build.'"

James W. Prescott firmly believed that many cultures, especially western cultures, were failing their children by separating them from the mother and to a lesser extent, the father too soon. Much of his work after his research at NICHD involved advocacy for healthy mother-child touch and explorative social outdoor play. Prescott also worked to raise awareness of the damages to children posed by isolation and sensory deprivation. His work was important in developing the understanding that neglect of children can be as traumatic and harmful as other forms of child abuse like outright violence. Prescott took this belief even further, claiming that a child that was connected, loved, stimulated, and nurtured was likely to have the tools to recover from later physical abuse, but a child that was left alone to the point of developmental impairment may not even have the neural pathways to handle everyday experiences.

In 1996, Prescott authored, and became one of the original 24 signers of, the Ashley Montagu Resolution, a petition to the United Nations World Court to end the genital modification and mutilation of children including circumcision, female genital mutilation, and subincision. Prescott continued to be critical of circumcision and advise against it later in his career.

== See also ==
Attachment theory

Attachment parenting

Humanism

Anti-social behavior
