= American Humanist Association =

US secularist advocacy organization

- Abbreviation: AHA
- Formation: 1941; 85 years ago
- Type: Non-profit
- Purpose: Advocate for equality for humanists, atheists, agnostics, and freethinkers.
- Location: Washington, D.C., United States
- Members: 34,000
- Key people: Candace Gorham (President); Fish Stark (Executive Director)
- Website: www.americanhumanist.org

The American Humanist Association (AHA) is a non-profit organization in the United States that advances secular humanism.

The American Humanist Association was founded in 1941 and currently provides legal assistance to defend the constitutional rights of secular and religious minorities, lobbies Congress on church-state separation and other issues, and maintains a grassroots network of 250 local affiliates and chapters that engage in social activism and community-building events. The AHA has several publications, including The Humanist, Free Mind, a peer-reviewed semi-annual scholastic journal, Essays in the Philosophy of Humanism, and TheHumanist.com. The organization states that it has over 34,000 members.

== History ==
In 1927, an organization named the "Humanist Fellowship" was founded during a gathering in Chicago. In 1928, the Fellowship started publishing the New Humanist magazine with H.G. Creel as its first editor. The New Humanist was published from 1928 to 1936. The first Humanist Manifesto was issued by a conference held at the University of Chicago in 1933. Signatories included John Dewey, but the majority were ministers (chiefly Unitarian) and theologians. They identified humanism as an ideology that espouses reason, ethics, and social and economic justice.

By 1935, the Humanist Fellowship had become the "Humanist Press Association", the first national association of humanism in the United States.

In July 1939, a group of Quakers, inspired by the 1933 Humanist Manifesto, incorporated the Humanist Society of Friends as a religious, educational, charitable nonprofit organization authorized to issue charters and train & ordain its own ministry. Upon ordination, these ministers were then accorded the same rights and privileges granted by law to priests, ministers, and rabbis of traditional theistic religions.

In 1941, Curtis Reese led the reorganization and incorporation of the "Humanist Press Association" as the American Humanist Association. Along with its reorganization, the AHA began printing The Humanist magazine. The AHA was initially headquartered in Yellow Springs, Ohio, then San Francisco, California, and, in 1978, Amherst, New York. Subsequently, the AHA moved to Washington, D.C.

In 1952, the AHA became a founding member of the International Humanist and Ethical Union (IHEU) in Amsterdam, Netherlands.

The AHA was the first national membership organization to support abortion rights. Around the same time, the AHA partnered with the American Ethical Union (AEU) to help establish the rights of non-theistic conscientious objectors to the Vietnam War. In the late 1960s, the AHA also secured a religious tax exemption to support its celebrant program, allowing Humanist celebrants to officiate at weddings legally, perform chaplaincy functions, and enjoy the same rights as traditional clergy.

In 1991, the AHA took control of the Humanist Society, a religious Humanist organization that now runs the celebrant program. After this transfer, the AHA commenced the process of jettisoning its religious tax exemption and resumed its exclusively educational status. Today the AHA U.S. Internal Revenue Service recognized the AHA as a nonprofit, tax exempt, 501(c)(3), publicly supported educational organization.

Membership numbers are disputed, but Djupe and Olson place it as "definitely fewer than 50,000." The AHA has over 575,000 followers on Facebook and over 42,000 followers on Twitter.

== Adjuncts and affiliates ==
The AHA is the supervising organization for various Humanist affiliates and adjunct organizations.

=== Black Humanist Alliance ===
The Black Humanist Alliance of the American Humanist Association was founded in 2016 as a pillar of its new "Initiatives for Social Justice". Like the Feminist Humanist Alliance and the LGBT Humanist Alliance, the Black Humanist Alliance uses an intersectional approach to addressing Black community issues. As its mission states, the BHA "concern ourselves with confronting expressions of religious hegemony in public policy," but is "also devoted to confronting social, economic, and political deprivations that disproportionately impact Black America due to centuries of culturally ingrained prejudices."

=== Feminist Humanist Alliance ===
The Feminist Humanist Alliance (formerly the Feminist Caucus) of the American Humanist Association was established in 1977 as a coalition of women and men within the AHA to work toward the advancement of women's rights and equality between the sexes in all aspects of society. Originally called the Women's Caucus, the new name was adopted in 1985 to represent all the caucus members and the caucus's goals. Over the years, members of the Caucus have advocated for the passage of the Equal Rights Amendment and participated in various public demonstrations, including marches for women's and civil rights. In 1982, the Caucus established its annual Humanist Heroine Award, presenting the initial award to Sonia Johnson. Others receiving the awards have included Tish Sommers, Christine Craft, and Fran Hosken. In 2012, the Caucus declared it would be organizing around two principal efforts: "Refocusing on passing the ERA" and "Promoting the Universal Declaration of Human Rights."

In 2016, the Feminist Caucus reorganized as the Feminist Humanist Alliance as a component of their larger "Initiatives for Social Justice". As stated on its website, the "refinement in vision" emphasized "FHA's more active partnership with outreach programs and social justice campaigns with distinctly inclusive feminist objectives." Its current goal is to provide a "movement powered by and for women, transpeople, and genderqueer people to fight for social justice. We are united to create inclusive and diverse spaces for activists and allies locally and nationally."

=== LGBTQ Humanist Alliance ===
The LGBTQ Humanist Alliance (formerly LGBT Humanist Council) of the American Humanist Association is committed to advancing equality for lesbian, gay, bisexual, and transgender people and their families. The alliance "seeks to cultivate safe and affirming communities, promote humanist values, and achieve full equality and social liberation of LGBTQ persons."

Paralleling the Black Humanist Alliance and the Feminist Humanist Alliance, the Council reformed in 2016 as the LGBTQ Humanist Alliance as a larger part of the AHA's "Initiatives for Social Justice".

=== Disaster Recovery ===
In 2014, the American Humanist Association (AHA) and Foundation Beyond Belief (FBB) merged their respective charitable programs, Humanist Charities (established in 2005) and Humanist Crisis Response (established in 2011). AHA's Executive Director Roy Speckhardt commented, "This merger is a positive move that will grow the relief efforts of the humanist community. The end result will be more money directed to charitable activities, dispelling the false claim that nonbelievers don't give to charity."

Now Foundation Beyond Belief's Disaster Recovery program serves as a focal point for the humanist response to major natural disasters and complex humanitarian crises worldwide. The program coordinates financial support and trains humanist volunteers to help impacted communities. The Disaster Recovery program is sustained through the ongoing partnership between FBB and AHA, and ensures that our community's efforts are centralized and efficient.

Between 2014 and 2018, Humanist Disaster Recovery has raised over $250,000 for victims of the Syrian Refugee Crisis, Refugee Children of the U.S. Border, Tropical Cyclone Sam, the Nepal and Ecuadoran Earthquakes, Hurricane Matthew in Haiti, and Hurricanes Irma and Maria. In addition to grants for recovery efforts, volunteers have also helped rebuild homes and schools in the following locations: Columbia, South Carolina, after the effects of Hurricane Joaquin, in Denham Springs, Louisiana and Houston, Texas, after the flooding from Hurricane Harvey.

=== Appignani Humanist Legal Center ===
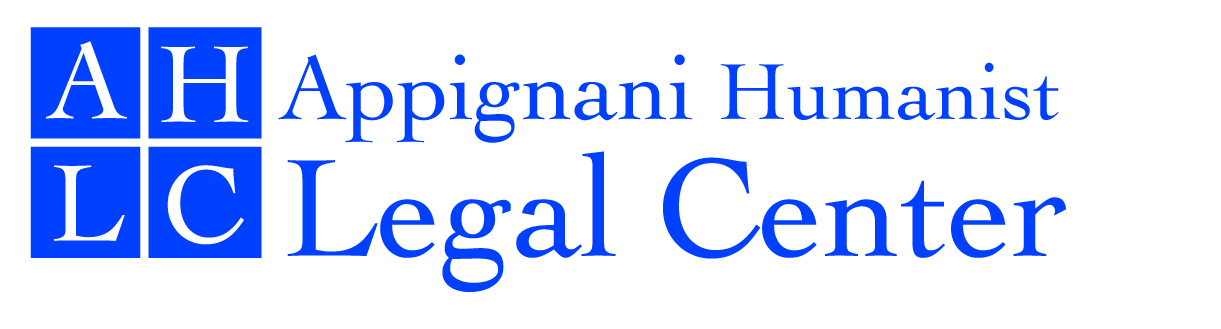
Official logo of the AHLC

The association launched the Appignani Humanist Legal Center (AHLC) in 2006 to ensure that humanists' constitutional rights are represented in court. Through amicus activity, litigation, and legal advocacy, a team of cooperating lawyers, including Jim McCollum, Wendy Kaminer, and Michael Newdow, provides legal assistance by challenging perceived violations of the Establishment Clause.

- The AHLC's first independent litigation was filed on November 29, 2006, in the United States District Court for the Southern District of Florida. Attorney James Hurley, the AHLC lawyer serving as lead counsel, filed suit against the Palm Beach County Supervisor of Elections on behalf of Plaintiff Jerry Rabinowitz, whose polling place was a church in Delray Beach, Florida. The church featured numerous religious symbols, including signs exhorting people to "Make a Difference with God" and anti-abortion posters, which the AHLC claimed demonstrated a violation of the Establishment Clause. In the voting area, "Rabinowitz observed many religious symbols in plain view, surrounding the election judges and directly above the voting machines. He took photographs that will be entered in evidence." U.S. District Judge Donald M. Middlebrooks ruled that Jerry Rabinowitz did not have standing to challenge the placement of polling sites in churches and dismissed the case.
- In February 2014, AHA brought suit to force the removal of the Bladensburg Peace Cross, a war memorial honoring 49 residents of Prince George's County, Maryland, who died in World War I. AHA represented the plaintiffs, Mr. Lowe, who drives by the memorial "about once a month," and Fred Edwords, former AHA Executive Director. AHA argued that the presence of a Christian religious symbol on public property violates the First Amendment clause prohibiting the government from establishing a religion. Town officials feel the monument to have historic and patriotic significant to local residents.
- In March 2014, a Southern California woman reluctantly removed a roadside memorial from near a freeway ramp where her 19-year-old son was killed after the AHA contacted the city council, calling the cross on city-owned property a "serious constitutional violation".
- AHLC represented an atheist family who claimed that the equal rights amendment of the Massachusetts constitution prohibits mandatory daily recitations of the Pledge of Allegiance because the anthem contains the phrase "under God". In November 2012, the Massachusetts Supreme Judicial Court permitted a direct appeal with oral arguments set for early 20th but, in May 2014, the Massachusetts Supreme Judicial Court ruled in a unanimous decision that the daily recitation of the phrase "under god" in the US Pledge of Allegiance does not violate the plaintiffs' equal protection rights under the Massachusetts Constitution.
- In February 2015, New Jersey Superior Court Judge David F. Bauman dismissed a lawsuit challenging the Pledge of Allegiance, ruling that "...the Pledge of Allegiance does not violate the rights of those who don't believe in God and does not have to be removed from the patriotic message." In a twenty-one-page decision, Bauman wrote, "Under (the association members') reasoning, the very constitution under which (the members) seek redress for perceived atheistic marginalization could itself be deemed unconstitutional, an absurd proposition which (association members) do not and cannot advance here."

== Advertising campaigns ==
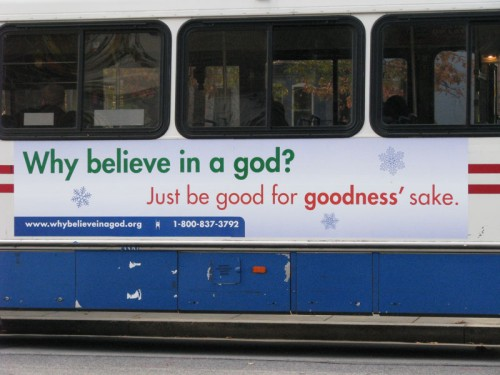
2008 Bus Campaign

The American Humanist Association has received media attention for its various advertising campaigns; in 2010, the AHA's campaign was said to be more expensive than similar ad campaigns from the American Atheists and Freedom From Religion Foundation.

In 2008, it ran ads on buses in Washington, D.C., that proclaimed "Why believe in a god? Just be good for goodness' sake", and since 2009, the organization has paid for billboard advertisements nationwide. One such billboard, which stated "No God... No Problem", was repeatedly vandalized.

In 2010, it launched another ad campaign promoting Humanism, which The New York Times said was the "first (atheist campaign) to include spots on television and cable" and was described by CNN as the "largest, most extensive advertising campaign ever by a godless organization". The campaign featured violent or sexist quotes from holy books, contrasted with quotes from humanist thinkers, including physicist Albert Einstein, and was largely underwritten by Todd Stiefel, a retired pharmaceutical company executive.

In late 2011 it launched a holiday billboard campaign, placing advertisements in 7 different cities: Kearny, New Jersey; Washington, D.C.; Cranston, Rhode Island; Bastrop, Louisiana; Oregon City, Oregon; College Station, Texas and Rochester Hills, Michigan", cities where AHA stated "atheists have experienced discrimination due to their lack of belief in a traditional god". The organization spent over $200,000 on their campaign, including a billboard reading "Yes, Virginia, there is no god."

In November 2012, the AHA launched a national ad campaign to promote a new website, KidsWithoutGod.com, with ads using the slogans "I'm getting a bit old for imaginary friends" and "You're Not The Only One". The campaign included bus advertising in Washington, DC, a billboard in Moscow, Idaho, and online ads on the family of websites run by Cheezburger and Pandora Radio, as well as Facebook, Reddit, Google, and YouTube. Ads were turned down because of their content by Disney, Time for Kids and National Geographic Kids.

== National Day of Reason ==
The American Humanist Association and the Washington Area Secular Humanists created the National Day of Reason in 2003. In addition to serving as a holiday for secularists, the National Day of Reason was created in response to the unconstitutionality of the National Day of Prayer. According to the event organizers, the National Day of Prayer "violates the First Amendment of the United States Constitution because it asks federal, state, and local government entities to set aside tax dollar supported time and space to engage in religious ceremonies". Several organizations associated with the National Day of Reason have organized food drives and blood donations, while other groups have called for an end to prayer invocations at city meetings. Other organizations, such as the Oklahoma and Minnesota Atheists, have organized local secular celebrations as alternatives to the National Day of Prayer. Additionally, many individuals affiliated with these atheistic groups choose to protest the official National Day of Prayer.

== Reason Rally ==
In 2012, the American Humanist Association co-sponsored the Reason Rally, a national gathering of "humanists, atheists, freethinkers and nonbelievers from across the United States and abroad" in Washington, D.C. The rally, held on the National Mall, had speakers such as Richard Dawkins, James Randi, Adam Savage, and student activist Jessica Ahlqvist. According to the Huffington Post, the event's attendance was between 8,000 and 10,000, while the Atlantic reported nearly 20,000. The AHA also co-sponsored the 2016 Reason Rally at the Lincoln Memorial.

== Famous awardees ==
The American Humanist Association has named a "Humanist of the Year" annually since 1953. It has also granted other honors to numerous leading figures, including Salman Rushdie (Outstanding Lifetime Achievement Award in Cultural Humanism 2007), Oliver Stone (Humanist Arts Award, 1996), Katharine Hepburn (Humanist Arts Award 1985), John Dewey (Humanist Pioneer Award, 1954), Jack Kevorkian (Humanist Hero Award, 1996) and Vashti McCollum (Distinguished Service Award, 1991).

== Controversy ==
In 2021, Richard Dawkins said on Twitter, "In 2015, Rachel Dolezal, a white chapter president of NAACP, was vilified for identifying as Black. Some men choose to identify as women, and some women choose to identify as men. You will be vilified if you deny that they literally are what they identify as. Discuss." After receiving criticism for this tweet, Dawkins responded by saying, "I do not intend to disparage trans people. I see that my academic 'Discuss' question has been misconstrued as such, and I deplore this. It was also not my intent to ally in any way with Republican bigots in the US now exploiting this issue."

In response to these comments, the American Humanist Association retracted Dawkins' 1996 Humanist of the Year Award. Robby Soave of Reason magazine criticized the retraction, saying, "The drive to punish dissenters from various orthodoxies is illiberal."

== AHA's Humanists of the Year ==
The AHA website presents the list of the following Humanists of the Year:

- Anton J. Carlson – 1953
- Arthur F. Bentley – 1954
- James P. Warbasse – 1955
- Charles Judson Herrick – 1956
- Margaret Sanger – 1957
- Oscar Riddle – 1958
- Brock Chisholm – 1959
- Leó Szilárd – 1960
- Linus Pauling – 1961
- Julian Huxley – 1962
- Hermann J. Muller – 1963
- Carl Rogers – 1964
- Hudson Hoagland – 1965
- Erich Fromm – 1966
- Abraham H. Maslow – 1967
- Benjamin Spock – 1968
- R. Buckminster Fuller – 1969
- A. Philip Randolph – 1970
- Albert Ellis – 1971
- B.F. Skinner – 1972
- Thomas Szasz – 1973
- Joseph Fletcher – 1974
- Mary Calderone – 1974
- Henry Morgentaler – 1975
- Betty Friedan – 1975
- Jonas E. Salk – 1976
- Corliss Lamont – 1977
- Margaret E. Kuhn – 1978
- Edwin H. Wilson – 1979
- Andrei Sakharov – 1980
- Carl Sagan – 1981
- Helen Caldicott – 1982
- Lester A. Kirkendall – 1983
- Isaac Asimov – 1984
- John Kenneth Galbraith – 1985
- Faye Wattleton – 1986
- Margaret Atwood – 1987
- Leo Pfeffer – 1988
- Gerald A. Larue – 1989
- Ted Turner – 1990
- Werner Fornos – 1991
- Lester R. Brown – 1991
- Kurt Vonnegut – 1992
- Richard D. Lamm – 1993
- Lloyd Morain – 1994
- Mary Morain – 1994
- Ashley Montagu – 1995
- Richard Dawkins – 1996; revoked 2021
- Alice Walker – 1997
- Barbara Ehrenreich – 1998
- Edward O. Wilson – 1999
- William F. Schulz – 2000
- Stephen Jay Gould – 2001
- Steven Weinberg – 2002
- Sherwin T. Wine – 2003
- Daniel Dennett – 2004
- Murray Gell-Mann – 2005
- Steven Pinker – 2006
- Joyce Carol Oates – 2007
- Pete Stark – 2008
- PZ Myers – 2009
- Bill Nye – 2010
- Rebecca Goldstein – 2011
- Gloria Steinem – 2012
- Dan Savage – 2013
- Barney Frank – 2014
- Lawrence M. Krauss – 2015; revoked 2018
- Jared Diamond – 2016
- Adam Savage – 2017
- Jennifer Ouellette – 2018
- Salman Rushdie – 2019
- Jared Huffman – 2020
- Anthony Fauci – 2021
- no award given – 2022
- Michael E. Mann - 2023
- Amy Goodman – 2024
- Jelani Cobb - 2025

== See also ==
- Humanism
- Secular humanism
- John Dewey
- Charles Francis Potter
- Bertrand Russell
- Louis Appignani
- List of general awards in the humanities
