= Experimental Neurology =

- Discipline: Neurology, neuroscience
- Language: English
- Edited by: Ahmet Hoke

Publication details
- History: 1959-present
- Publisher: Elsevier
- Frequency: Monthly
- Impact factor: 5.33 (2020)

Standard abbreviations
- ISO 4: Exp. Neurol.

Indexing
- CODEN: EXNEAC
- ISSN: 0014-4886 (print); 1090-2430 (web)
- LCCN: 61038087
- OCLC no.: 848514410
- Neurodegeneration
- ISSN: 1055-8330

Links
- Journal homepage; Online access

Experimental Neurology is a monthly peer-reviewed medical journal that focuses on research in neuroscience concerning mechanisms underlying neurological disorders. The journal focuses on neural development, neuroregeneration, neuroplasticity, and transplantation,. It was established in 1959 and is published by Elsevier. According to the Journal Citation Reports, the journal has a 2020 impact factor of 5.33. In 1997, Experimental Neurology absorbed the quarterly journal Neurodegeneration, which had been established in 1992.

== Past editors-in-chief ==
- 1959–1975: William F. Windle
- 1973–1988: Carmine D. Clemente
