= Adelaide Orsola Appignani =

Italian composer

Adelaide Orsola Appignani (also known as Orsola Aspri; 1807 – 30 September 1884) was an Italian singer, conductor, music educator and composer. She was a singer and conductor in Florence and Rome in 1839. She was a member of the Roman Academie Filarmonica at Pallazio Lancelotti and was granted an honorary membership in 1842 of the Academie de St. Cecelia. Appignani also taught singing, and one her students was notable tenor Settimio Malvezzi.

== Life ==
Adelaide Orsola Appignani (also known as Orsola Aspri) was born in Rome around 1807. Her parents were Serafino and Cecilia Persiani, After her widowed mother married the well-known violinist Andrea Aspri, Appignani changed her name to Orsola Aspri.

Appignani studied music under Valentino Fioravanti. After completing her studies, she was active as a singer and a conductor in Florence and Rome in 1839. She was a member of the Roman Academie Filarmonica at Pallazio Lancelotti, and performed Smeton in Donizetti's Anna Bolena there in 1833.

Appignani was granted an honorary membership in 1842 of the Academie de St. Cecelia, "for singing, piano, and composition". In 1843 she wrote the opera I pirati (The Pirates) for the Aliberto delle Dame theatre, where it was performed "with reasonable success".

Appignani also taught singing and had as her student the tenor Settimio Malvezzi. Appignani wrote a melodrama Clara de Clevers, which was first performed in 1876 at the Teatro Nazionale in Bologna. It was the first performance after the theatre changed its named from Teatro di Via Nosadella. She wrote four operas in total. Some of her romances and duets were printed in Rome by Ambrosini.

She married Count Girolamo Cenci-Bolognetti. Appignani died on 30 September 1884 in Rome.

== Works ==
Her selected works include:

- Le advventure de una giornata (melodrama) 1827
- I riti indiani (opera) 1834
- I pirati (melodrama) 1843
- Clara de Clevers (melodrama) 1876
- Sinfonia for instruments (symphony), 1834
- Le redenzioni de Roma (cantata) 1871
