= Louis Appignani =

American businessman and philanthropist (1933–2026)

- Born: March 30, 1933; New York City, U.S.
- Died: October 14, 2026 (aged 93); Miami, Florida, U.S.
- Education: M.S. degree Postgraduate studies in economics
- Alma mater: Indiana University; Baruch College; Columbia University
- Occupations: Businessman, philanthropist

Louis Appignani (March 30, 1933 – October 14, 2026) was an American businessman and philanthropist from Miami, Florida. He was chairman and founder of Louja Realty Inc., chairman and founder of Computer Education Inc. and, until 2000, Barbizon International Modeling School.

== Life and career ==
Appignani was born in Manhattan, New York City, on March 30, 1933. He attended postgraduate studies in economics at Indiana University. Appignani graduated from Baruch College of the City University of New York, earning his M.S. degree in finance from Columbia University. He served on the boards of a number of professional civic organizations.

In 2001 Appignani established the Appignani Foundation to "support secular activities that will address significant, viable and long term human goals on our planet". He also founded the IHEU Appignani Center for Bioethics, formerly a branch of the International Humanist and Ethical Union but now under the aegis of the American Humanist Association (AHA). It is "dedicated to providing thoughtful, timely research and analyses of bioethical challenges facing the global community". Appignani also founded the Appignani Humanist Legal Center, a project of the AHA.

In 2006, he received the Humanist Business Award from AHA.

Appignani died in Miami on October 14, 2026, at the age of 93.
