= National Day of Prayer =

Annual observance in the United States

- Observed by: United States
- Date: First Thursday in May
- 2025 date: May 1
- 2026 date: May 7
- 2027 date: May 6
- 2028 date: May 4
- Frequency: Annual
- Related to: Day of Prayer

The National Day of Prayer is an annual day of observance designated by the United States Congress and held on the first Thursday of May, when people are asked "to turn to God in prayer and meditation". The president is required by law (36 U.S.C. § 119) to sign a proclamation each year, encouraging all Americans to pray on this day.

The modern law formalizing its annual observance was enacted in 1952 as part of the public reaction to the threats perceived in the Korean War, although earlier days of fasting and prayer had been established by the Second Continental Congress from 1775 until 1783, and by President John Adams in 1798 and 1799.

The constitutionality of the National Day of Prayer was unsuccessfully challenged in court by the Freedom From Religion Foundation after an appellate court dismissed the case based on standing without ruling on the day's legality. The Alliance Defense Fund (now known as the Alliance Defending Freedom) provided the defense for observance of the National Day of Prayer.

== History ==
The National Day of Prayer shares common roots with the celebration of Thanksgiving; both were national proclamations establishing a day of prayer. In the New England Colonies under British rule, traditional observances in late fall called for prayer and thanksgiving, while observances in the spring or summer called for prayer and fasting. The fall observance was established by President Abraham Lincoln as the official Thanksgiving holiday in 1863. The spring observance was established by President Harry S. Truman in 1952 as the National Day of Prayer.

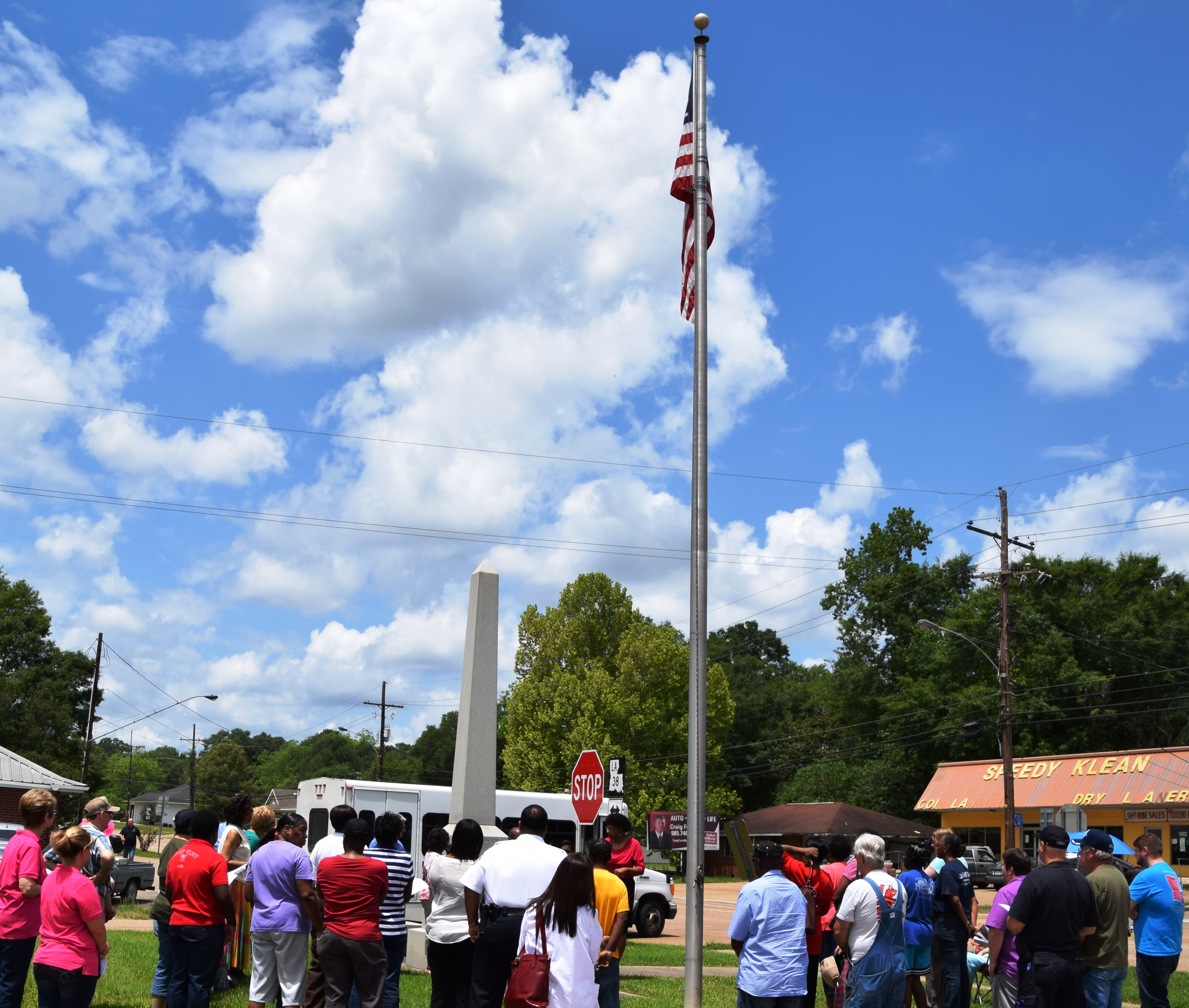
Residents of Kentwood, Louisiana, gather outside the Town Hall alongside LA 38 to observe 2015's National Day of Prayer.

Friction in 1768–1776 between the American colonists and England spurred some American cities and colonies to proclaim days of prayer. For instance, Boston declared a day of fasting and prayer in September 1768, as a protest against a British plan to station troops in the city. The Colony of Virginia's House of Burgesses established a day of fasting and prayer to take place on Wednesday, June 1, 1774, to protest the Boston Port Act, such that the people of Virginia would assemble for prayer led by clergymen. Thomas Jefferson wrote that "the effect of the day through the whole colony was like a shock of electricity", moving the Virginians to choose delegates to establish self-rule. The Provinces of South Carolina, Maryland and Georgia all observed official days of fasting and prayer during 1774–1775.

The observance of a day of fasting and prayer was brought to all of the colonists by the Continental Congress in 1775. Congress issued a proclamation recommending "a day of publick humiliation, fasting, and prayer" be observed by the "English Colonies" on Thursday, July 20, 1775, "and to bless our rightful sovereign, King George the Third..." The text, written by John Witherspoon and John Hancock, instructed the colonists to pray for a resumption of "the just rights and privileges of the Colonies" in "civil and religious" matters. A proclamation to this end was sent to every town in the colonies. John Adams wrote that the popular response was gratifying, that the special day was more widely observed than the practice of going to church on Sunday. After this success, Congress determined to call for a day of fasting and prayer each spring, and a day of thanksgiving and praise each fall.

In his role as Commander-in-Chief of the Continental Army, General George Washington acknowledged a day of "fasting, humiliation and prayer" proclaimed by the Continental Congress to be held on Thursday, May 6, 1779. To enable his soldiers to observe the day, Washington ordered a one-day cessation of recreation and "unnecessary labor". In March 1780, Congress announced a day of "fasting, humiliation and prayer" to be held on Wednesday, April 26, 1780.

As governor of Virginia, Jefferson enacted a day of prayer and thanksgiving for the state in December 1779.

The practice of calling for national days of fasting and prayer was abandoned from 1784 until 1789, even though thanksgiving days were observed each fall. On October 3, 1789, President Washington called for a national day of prayer and thanksgiving to be observed on Thursday, November 26, 1789; this was an extension of the tradition of thanksgiving which was already customary in New England. President Adams continued the practice of proclaiming national days of prayer in the spring and fall, but President Jefferson did not, as he considered prayer to be a matter for personal rather than state involvement.

After James Madison, none of the next eleven presidents issued prayer proclamations. Thus, there was a period of 47 years, from 1815 to 1862, with no presidential prayer proclamations. President Abraham Lincoln resumed the practice in 1863, declaring April 30 a national day of humiliation, fasting and prayer in Proclamation 97.

In January–February 1952 during the Korean War, the desirability of a united national prayer was stated by Reverend Billy Graham, who said, "What a thrilling, glorious thing it would be to see the leaders of our country today kneeling before Almighty God in prayer. What a thrill would sweep this country. What renewed hope and courage would grip the Americans at this hour of peril." Representative Percy Priest from Tennessee observed that Graham had issued a challenge for a national day of prayer. Members of the House and Senate introduced a joint resolution for an annual National Day of Prayer, "on which the people of the United States may turn to God in prayer and meditation at churches, in groups, and as individuals." On April 17, 1952, President Harry S. Truman signed a bill proclaiming a National Day of Prayer must be declared by each subsequent president at an appropriate date of his choice.

In 1982 a conservative evangelical Christian organization called the "National Prayer Committee" was formed to coordinate and implement a fixed annual day of prayer for the purpose of organizing evangelical Christian prayer events with local, state, and federal government entities. The Thanks-Giving Foundation also collaborated in this effort. In his 1983 declaration, Ronald Reagan said, "From General Washington's struggle at Valley Forge to the present, this Nation has fervently sought and received divine guidance as it pursued the course of history. This occasion provides our Nation with an opportunity to further recognize the source of our blessings, and to seek His help for the challenges we face today and in the future."

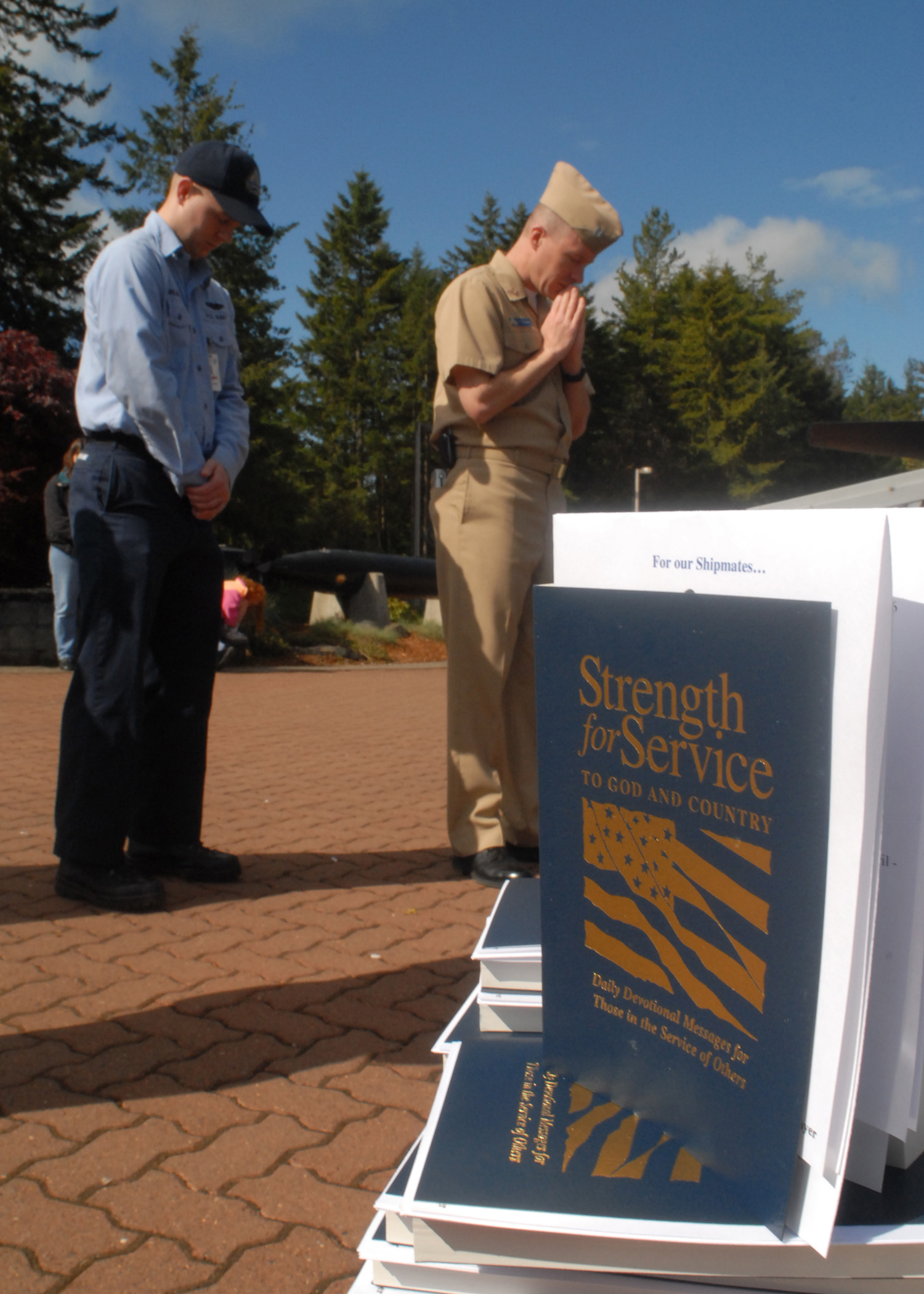
Sailors bow their heads in prayer during the National Day of Prayer. May 3, 2007.

In 1988, the law was amended so that the National Day of Prayer would be held on the first Thursday of May. Two stated intentions of the National Day of Prayer were that it would be a day when adherents of all great religions could unite in prayer and that it may one day bring renewed respect for God to all the peoples of the world.

Republican Ronald Reagan administration and George H. W. Bush administration (1981–1993) each hosted special National Day of Prayer events held at the White House only once during their administrations. Democrat Bill Clinton administration (1993–2001) did not hold any such events during his time in office, though he issued proclamations annually.

Republican George W. Bush administration (2001–2009) made his first presidential act be the announcement of a National Day of Prayer, and he held events at the White House in each year of his presidency.

Democratic President Barack Obama (2009–2017) did not hold any public events at the White House, though he issued presidential proclamations regularly each year.

Republican President Donald Trump and First Lady Melania Trump attended church services in observation of a special National Day of Prayer, which Trump previously declared, in support of the victims of Hurricane Harvey dwelling in the state of Texas, to "uplift one another and assist those suffering from the consequences of this terrible storm."

On May 7, 2020, due to the COVID-19 pandemic, many virtual prayer events were planned. President Trump issued an official proclamation. A national event was planned for the evening, to be co-hosted by the grandson of evangelist Billy Graham.

== Observance ==
The National Day of Prayer is celebrated by Americans of many religions, including Christians of many denominations, including Protestants and Catholics, as well as Sikhs, Muslims, Hindus, and Jews, reflecting the demographics of the United States. On the National Day of Prayer, many Americans assemble in prayer in front of courthouses, as well as in houses of worship, such as churches, mosques, synagogues, and temples. Luncheons, picnics, and music performances revolving around praying for the nation are also popular observances.

== Legal challenge ==
The Freedom From Religion Foundation (FFRF) sued to challenge the designation of a National Day of Prayer. On October 3, 2008, the Wisconsin-based organization filed suit in the federal district court for western Wisconsin in Madison, naming as defendants President George W. Bush; White House press secretary Dana Perino; Wisconsin governor Jim Doyle; and evangelist James Dobson's wife, Shirley Dobson, in her capacity as chair of the National Day of Prayer Task Force. The Alliance Defense Fund (ADF) provided defense for Shirley Dobson while government lawyers asked U.S. District Judge Barbara Crabb to dismiss the case, arguing principally that the group has no legal standing to sue.

On March 1, 2010, U.S. District Judge Barbara Crabb stated that FFRF's lawsuit could proceed because the plaintiffs had shown that they suffered "concrete injury" that can potentially be remedied by judicial action. Judge Crabb stated about those supporting the federal law designating the National Day of Prayer, "adopting [the] defendants' view of standing would allow the government to have unrestrained authority to demean members of any religious group without legal consequence. The federal government could declare the 'National Day of Anti-Semitism' or even declare Christianity the official religion of the United States, but no one would have standing to sue because no one would have to 'pass by' those declarations." On April 15, 2010, Judge Crabb ruled that the statute establishing the National Day of Prayer was unconstitutional as it is "an inherently religious exercise that serves no secular function." However, Crabb stayed her ruling pending the completion of appeals.

The U.S. Department of Justice filed a notice to appeal the ruling on April 22, 2010, and on April 14, 2011, a three judge panel of the Seventh Circuit Court of Appeals unanimously overturned Crabb's decision. The panel ruled that FFRF did not have standing to sue because the National Day of Prayer had not caused them harm and stated that "a feeling of alienation cannot suffice as injury." The court further stated that "the President is free to make appeals to the public based on many kinds of grounds, including political and religious, and that such requests do not obligate citizens to comply and do not encroach on citizens' rights." The federal appeals court also cited Abraham Lincoln's second inaugural address, which referenced God seven times and prayer three times.

== See also ==
- Day of Prayer
- National Day of Reason
- National Prayer Breakfast
- National Religious Freedom Day
- See You at the Pole
- Great Prayer Day, a public holiday in Denmark introduced in 1686 in the wake of the Reformation of the national church
- Penance and Pray Day, a national German day of prayer and repentance, historically state-ordered (but binding only on Protestants)
