= Stephen Juan =

Australian anthropologist (1949–2018)

- Born: Stephen Juan; July 18, 1949; Napa County, California
- Died: July 23, 2018 (aged 69); Sydney, Australia
- Education: University of California at Berkeley
- Scientific career
- Fields: Anthropology, Education
- Workplaces: Sydney University

Stephen Juan (July 18, 1949 – July 23, 2018) was an Australian-U.S. scientist, educator, journalist, author, and media personality. He has written thirteen books, including The Odd Body and The Odd Brain.

== Background ==
Juan was born in Napa County, California, later attending the University of California at Berkeley, where he received a B.A. in Anthropology, an M.A. in Education, and a Ph.D. in Anthropology and Education. He moved to Australia in 1978 and began teaching at the University of Sydney in what is now the Faculty of Education and Social Work. He taught for more than 30 years before retiring in 2009 while remaining the Ashley Montagu Fellow for the Public Understanding of Human Sciences. Besides books, Juan has been a regular columnist for The Sydney Morning Herald, The Sun-Herald, The Daily News, The Register, and The National Post. Juan has appeared on numerous television and radio programs explaining and answering questions about the human body, brain, and personality. To date, he has appeared more than 2000 times on various Australian Broadcasting Commission (ABC) television and radio programs.

Juan received a number of awards for his writing, including an international medical print journalism award from the American Medical Association. In October 2012, Juan was designated as a "Public Bright" by the Brights, a U.S. based organization advocating the elevation and illumination of the naturalistic worldview. Juan was a human dignity and human rights activist and an advocate for "the prime directive of education" as the litmus test of society: That society is best which best develops every person to the fullest extent of their developmental potential.

Juan died on July 23, 2018.

== Bibliography ==
- Only human: Why we react, how we behave, what we feel (1990)
- All too human (1990)
- A Study Shows... (1991)
- A Study Shows II... (1992)
- The Odd Body Volumes 1-3 (1995, 2000, 2007)
- The Odd Brain (1998)
- Parenting, Child Development, and Child Health Volumes 1-2 (2000, 2001)
- The Odd Sex (2001)
- Can Kissing Make You Live Longer? (2010)
- Who's Afraid of Butterflies? (2011)
