= National Day of Reason =

Annual secular celebration in the United States

- Observed by: United States secular humanists
- Date: First Thursday in May
- 2025 date: May 1
- 2026 date: May 7
- 2027 date: May 6
- 2028 date: May 4
- Frequency: annual
- Related to: National Day of Prayer; Day of Prayer; Darwin Day

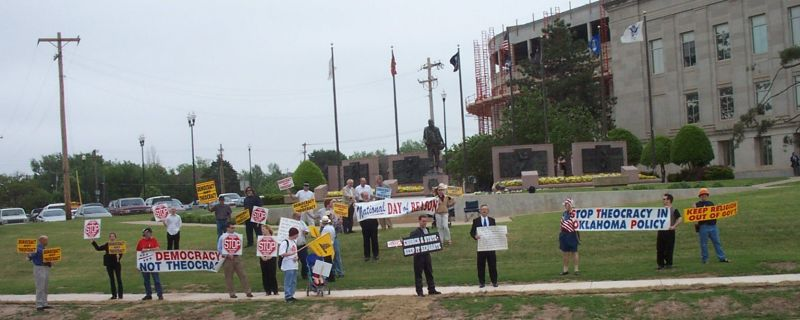
A National Day of Reason protest in Oklahoma City

The National Day of Reason is a secular celebration for humanists, atheists, secularists, and freethinkers. The day is celebrated annually on the first Thursday in May, in response to the statutory observance of a National Day of Prayer in the United States, which many atheist and secular groups deem unconstitutional. The purpose of the National Day of Reason is to "celebrate reasona concept all Americans can support and to raise public awareness about the persistent threat to religious liberty posed by government intrusion into the private sphere of worship." The National Day of Reason is also meant to help build community among the non-religious in the United States.

== History ==
The National Day of Reason was created by the American Humanist Association and the Washington Area Secular Humanists in 2003. In addition to serving as a holiday for constitutionalists and secularists, the National Day of Reason was created in response to the perceived unconstitutionality of the National Day of Prayer. According to the organizers of the National Day of Reason, the National Day of Prayer, "violates the First Amendment of the United States Constitution because it asks federal, state, and local government entities to set aside tax dollar supported time and space to engage in religious ceremonies".

In 2005, the New York City–based Center for Atheism began to strongly advocate for observers of the National Day of Reason to celebrate in a positive manner. They decided to donate blood as a group in order to make a "public statement about the life-affirming ideas of nonbelievers." Also beginning in 2005, another alternative supported by some interfaith groups has been the renaming of the National Day of Prayer as the National Day of Prayer and Reflection.

The National Day of Reason has taken some time to gain popularity. Over time, however, more local and state governments have been giving the Day of Reason official recognition. In 2011 and 2012, Representative Pete Stark supported a proclamation in support of the National Day of Reason in the United States House of Representatives. For the first time, a resolution to honor the National Day of Reason was introduced in the U.S. House of Representatives. The resolution, U.S. House Resolution 228, was proposed by Representative Mike Honda on April 29, 2015. Another resolution to designate the National Day of Reason was sponsored by Representative Jared Huffman in 2018.

== Activities ==
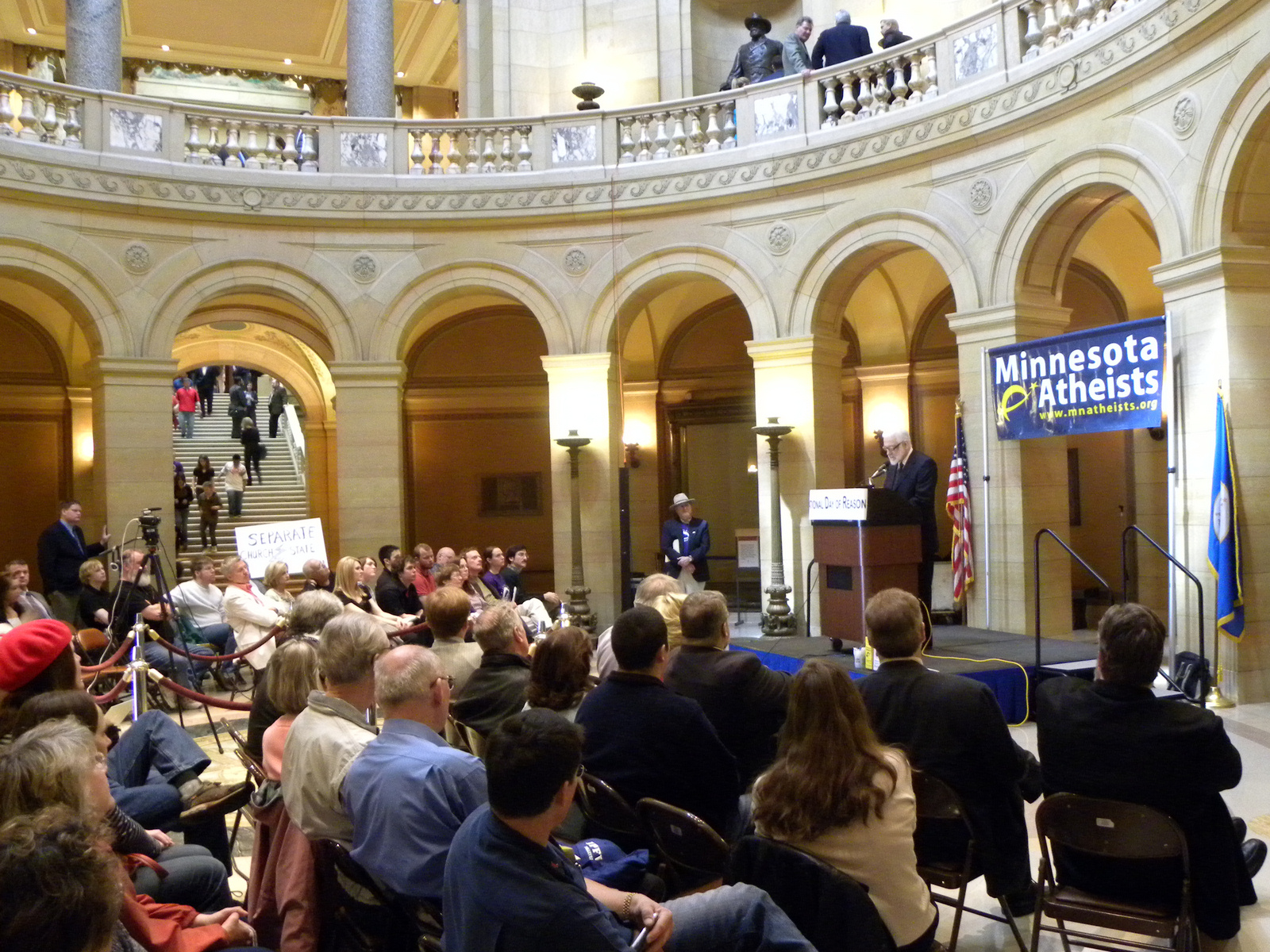
Humanists, atheists and agnostics held this event in support of the separation of church and state, and as a protest to the government endorsed National Day of Prayer, on May 6, 2010.

Several organizations associated with the National Day of Reason have organized food drives and blood donations, while other groups have called for an end to prayer invocations at city meetings. Other organizations, such as the Oklahoma Atheists and the Minnesota Atheists, have organized local secular celebrations as alternatives to the National Day of Prayer. Additionally, many individuals affiliated with these atheistic groups choose to protest the National Day of Prayer.

Some politicians have supported the National Day of Reason. In Omaha, Nebraska, Mayor Jean Stothert signed a proclamation supporting the National Day of Reason and urging all citizens to "promote the development and application of reason. Her proclamation never once mentions a non belief in God or Prayer." City governments who affirm the National Day of Prayer have also been asked to consider affirming the National Day of Reason as well.
