= Charles Manning Child =

American zoologist

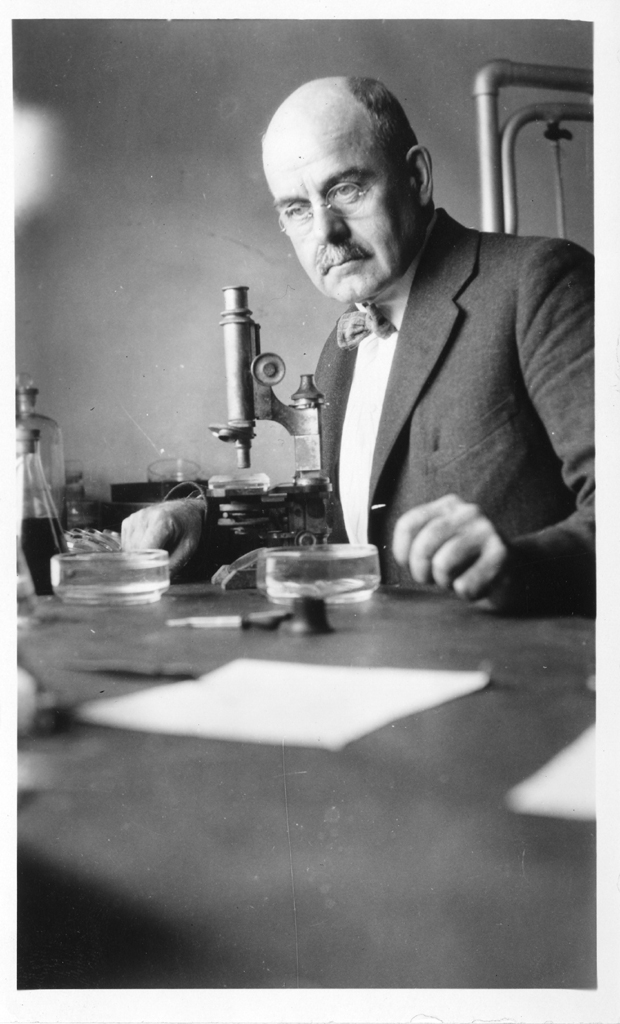
- Born: February 2, 1869; Ypsilanti, Michigan, U.S.
- Died: December 19, 1954 (aged 85); Palo Alto, California, U.S.
- Resting place: Green Mount Cemetery
- Education: Wesleyan University; University of Leipzig
- Scientific career
- Fields: Zoology
- Workplaces: American Society of Zoologists; American Association of Anatomists; National Academy of Sciences

Charles Manning Child (February 2, 1869 – December 19, 1954) was an American zoologist noted for his work on regeneration at the University of Chicago.

== Early life ==
Child was born on February 2, 1869, in Ypsilanti, Michigan, to Charles Chauncy Child and Mary Elizabeth (née Manning) Child. He was the only surviving child to the couple. Growing up on a family farm in Higganum, Connecticut, Child enjoyed reading. After graduating from elementary school in 1882, Child attended Middletown High School in Middletown, Connecticut, until his graduation in 1886.

== Career ==
Child was accepted to Wesleyan University in Middletown. In 1890 he graduated Wesleyan with a Bachelor of Philosophy and in 1892 he received a Master of Science degree from the same university, having served as a graduate assistant in biology at Wesleyan from 1890 to 1892. Working under Rudolf Leuckart at the University of Leipzig, Child graduated with a Doctor of Philosophy in 1894. Upon returning to the United States, he met Lydia Van Meter in 1895, and the couple married in 1899; they had one daughter, Jeannette Manning Child.

He spent the majority of his academic career (1895–1934) at the University of Chicago, where he conducted research on regeneration, especially on Coelenterates and flatworms. In 1915, Child published Individuality in Organisms, which dealt primarily with "the problem of the nature, of the unity, and order in the organism", according to an American Social Hygiene Association review. He became a professor a year later, a position he held until his retirement in 1937. Wesleyan awarded Child the honorary D.D. degree in 1928 and also began a two-year stint as the first (Managing) Editor of the scientific journal Physiological and Biochemical Zoology. He became a member of the National Academy of Sciences in 1935.

After retiring, Child and his wife moved to Palo Alto, California, in 1939, where he lectured at Stanford University. In 1941 Child published Patterns and Problems of Development, which summarized his life work. After having multiple surgeries due to cancer, Child died on December 19, 1954, in Palo Alto; he was cremated, and the ashes were sent to the Van Meter plot in Green Mount Cemetery, Baltimore, Maryland. Writing for the National Academy of Sciences in 1957, zoologist Libbie Hyman called Child's devotion to science "of the purest sort" and "unmarred by personal ambition or striving for fame and position."
