= Secular Solstice =

American secular humanist event

The Secular Solstice is a secular humanist event started in New York City in 2011 by Raymond Arnold. It is celebrated annually on the winter solstice (or a nearby convenient date) by secular groups such as the Sunday Assembly and the rationalist community. The largest observance is held in the Bay Area, with the second largest in New York City, though additional solstices are held in a wide range of other locations, such as Maryland, Kansas, Texas, Washington, Illinois, Canada, the United Kingdom, New Zealand and Russia.

== Background ==
The origin of the secular solstice began after Arnold invited 20 friends to his house in 2011 for a holiday gathering. There, they "ate some food, sang some songs, and lit some candles" and "told stories about why the universe was the way it was and about what kind of people we wanted to be". At the end of the gathering they extinguished the last candle in the room and sat for a moment in darkness. The first official Secular Solstice event was held in 2013 in New York City and was funded through Kickstarter. In 2014, secular solstice events were also held in Oakland, California (in the Humanist Hall at the Fellowship of Humanity), as well as in Seattle, San Diego, and Leipzig, Germany.

To fund the 2014 Solstice, Raymond Arnold created another Kickstarter funding round which raised $8,157 from 164 backers. From 2014 to 2017, the New York City secular solstice was held in the main auditorium at the New York Society for Ethical Culture.

== Traditions ==
Secular solstice contains "moments of hilarity as well as deep seriousness" and is focused around communal singing. Solstice events commonly follow an arc of "a journey from light to dark to light again, engaging with humanity’s past, present and future."

== Album ==
Recordings of 11 original Secular Solstice songs were released on bandcamp in June 2014. In December 2018, an Indiegogo fundraiser was launched to cover production costs for a new professionally recorded Secular Solstice album.
