= Isaac Adler =

Isaac Adler may refer to:

- Isaac Adler (politician) (1868–1941), American attorney and politician
- Isaac Adler (physician) (c. 1849–1918), American physician
