= Spruce Street Singers =

The Spruce Street Singers was a gay men's chorus in Philadelphia, Pennsylvania. Co-founded by Stephen Ng in 1985, they had several directors, including Jonathan Palant (2001-2002). Their farewell concert was on November 19, 2005 at the Ethical Society of Philadelphia.

At least two other groups were created through the Spruce Street Singers - "Men On Tap," an LGBT tap dancing ensemble, and "Philadelphia Voices of Pride," an LGBT choral ensemble.
