= Washington Ethical Society v. District of Columbia =

- Court: United States Court of Appeals for the District of Columbia Circuit
- Full case name: Washington Ethical Society, a corporation, Petitioner v. District of Columbia Respondent.
- Argued: May 29, 1957
- Decided: October 17, 1957
- Citation: 249 F.2d 127

Court membership
- Judges sitting: Warren Burger, E. Barrett Prettyman, Charles Fahy

Case opinions
- Majority: Burger, joined by unanimous

Laws applied
- D.C.Code, 47-801a (1951)

Washington Ethical Society v. District of Columbia, 249 F.2d 127 (1957), was a case of the United States Court of Appeals for the District of Columbia Circuit. The Washington Ethical Society functions much like a church, but regards itself as a non-theistic religious institution, honoring the importance of ethical living without mandating a belief in a supernatural origin for ethics. The case involved denial of the Society's application for tax exemption as a religious organization. The D.C. Circuit reversed the ruling of the Tax Court for the District Columbia and found that the Society was a religious organization under the District of Columbia Code, 47-801a (1951). The Society thus was granted its tax exemption.

== Significance ==
Along with Fellowship of Humanity v. County of Alameda, this was one of the earliest cases establishing the right in the U.S. of nontheistic institutions that function like churches to be treated similarly to theistic religious institutions under the law.

This case is sometimes cited as establishing secular humanism as a religion under the law. That characterization of the case is disputed by others, for a number of reasons:

- Different groups use the term "secular humanism" differently. According to some definitions, the Society does not practice secular humanism. The Society practices Ethical Culture, the philosophy of a movement founded in 1876, predating the modern Humanist movement. While Ethical Culture is, broadly speaking, a humanist philosophy, it has its own distinct character. As practiced by the Washington Ethical Society, it is in many respects more aligned with religious humanism than with secular humanism.
- The court decision did not address the question of whether the ideas of Ethical Culture were inherently religious; it merely determined that the Washington Ethical Society functioned like a church and so was entitled to similar protections.
- In the obiter dictum note in the case Torcaso v. Watkins in which Justice Hugo Black apparently coined the phrase, this case was referenced but the term Secular Humanism apparently referred to the case Fellowship of Humanity v. County of Alameda.

== Rationale for decision ==
The decision of the court was written by then-Judge Warren Burger (who was later appointed to the U.S. Supreme Court). Judge E. Barrett Prettyman and Judge Charles Fahy joined. The decision stated:

The sole issue raised is whether petitioner falls within the definition of a "church" or a "religious society" . . . . The taxing authority urges denial of the tax exemption asserting petitioner is not a religious society or church and that it does not use its buildings for religious worship since "religious" and "worship" require a belief in and teaching of a Supreme Being who controls the universe. The position of the tax Court, in denying tax exemption, was that belief in and teaching of the existence of a Divinity is essential to qualify under the statute. . . . To construe exemptions so strictly that unorthodox or minority forms of worship would be denied the exemption benefits granted to those conforming to the majority beliefs might well raise constitutional issues . . . . The question before us now is not broadly whether petitioner is in an ecclesiastical sense a religious society or a church, but narrowly whether under this particular statute it is qualified for tax exemption. . . . We hold on this record and under the controlling statutory language petitioner qualifies as "a religious corporation or society" . . . .
