= Ethical movement =

Ethical, educational, and religious movement

- The logotype of the Ethical Humanist movement
- Scripture: None
- Headquarters: New York City
- Founder: Felix Adler
- Origin: 1877
- Congregations: about 30
- Number of followers: Fewer than 10,000 (2014)
- Official website: www.aeu.org

The Ethical movement (also the Ethical Culture movement, Ethical Humanism, and Ethical Culture) is an ethical and educational movement established in 1877 by the academic Felix Adler (1851–1933). The premise of Ethical Culture is that honoring and living in accordance with a code of ethics is required to live a meaningful life and for making the world a better place for all people.

The movement originated from an effort among ethical secular people to develop and promote humanist codes of behavior, drawing on the developed moral traditions and moral philosophy of 19th century secular societies in Europe and the United States. In practice, members of the Ethical movement organized themselves as two types of organization: the secular humanist movement, which is avowedly non-religious, and a predominantly moral movement that saw itself as religious but not theistic.

In the United States, Ethical movements became organizations for the advancement of education (e.g., the American Humanist Association and the American Ethical Union). However, in the UK, they became secular humanist charities; the South Place Ethical Society and the British Ethical Union deliberately abandoned the congregational model of organization, becoming the Conway Hall Ethical Society and Humanists UK respectively.

Internationally, Ethical Culture and secular humanist organizations have always organized jointly; the American Ethical Union and the British Ethical Union were co-founders of Humanists International, whose original name, the "International Humanist and Ethical Union", reflected the philosophical unity of the Ethical Culture movement.

== History ==
=== Background ===
The Ethical movement was an outgrowth of secularism among Victorian intellectuals. A precursor to the doctrines of the Ethical movement can be found in the South Place Ethical Society, founded in 1793 as the South Place Chapel on Finsbury Square, on the edge of the City of London.

The Fabian Society was an outgrowth from the Fellowship of the New Life.

In the early nineteenth century, the chapel became known as "a radical gathering-place." At that point, it was a Unitarian chapel; like Quakers, the Unitarian movement supported female equality. Under the leadership of Reverend William Johnson Fox (who became minister of the congregation in 1817), it lent its pulpit to activists such as Anna Wheeler, one of the first women to campaign for feminism at public meetings in England, who spoke in 1829 on the "Rights of Women." In later decades, the chapel moved away from Unitarianism and changed its name first to the South Place Religious Society. It again changed its name to the South Place Ethical Society (a name it held formally, but it was better known as Conway Hall from 1929); its current name is Conway Hall Ethical Society.

The Fellowship of the New Life was established in 1883 by the Scottish intellectual Thomas Davidson. Fellowship members included poets Edward Carpenter and John Davidson, animal rights activist Henry Stephens Salt, sexologist Havelock Ellis, feminist Edith Lees (who later married Ellis), novelist Olive Schreiner and Edward R. Pease.

Its objective was "The cultivation of a perfect character in each and all." They wanted to transform society by setting an example of clean, simplified living for others to follow. Davidson was a major proponent of a structured philosophy about religion, ethics, and social reform.

At a meeting on 16 November 1883, a summary of the society's goals was drawn up by Maurice Adams:

We, recognizing the evils and wrongs that must beset men so long as our social life is based upon selfishness, rivalry, and ignorance, and desiring above all things to supplant it by a life based upon unselfishness, love, and wisdom, unite, for the purpose of realizing the higher life among ourselves, and of inducing and enabling others to do the same. And we now form ourselves into a Society, to be called the Guild [Fellowship] of the New Life, to carry out this purpose.

Although the Fellowship was short-lived, it spawned the Fabian Society, which split in 1884 from the Fellowship of the New Life.

=== In the United States ===
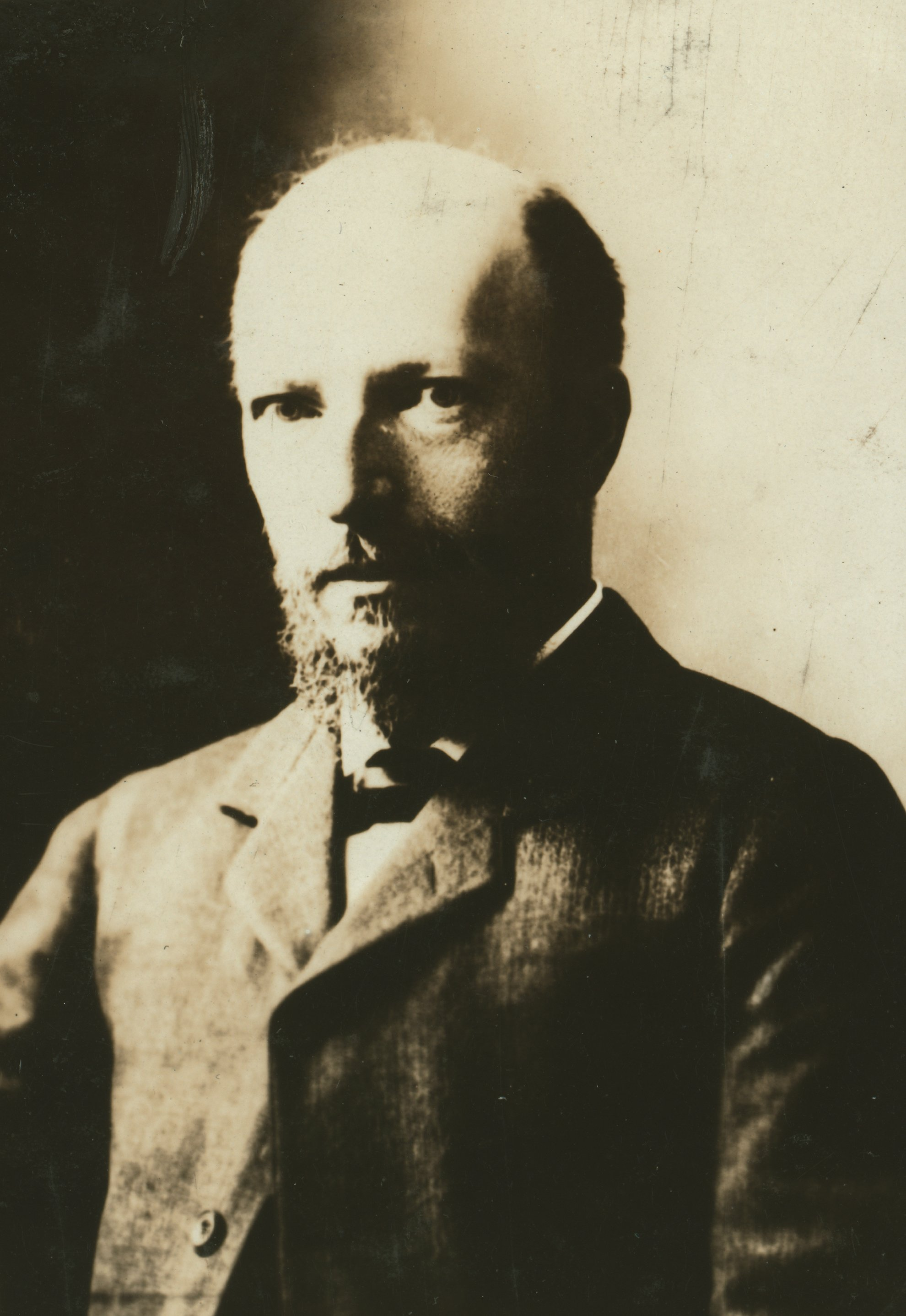
Felix Adler, founder of the Ethical movement.

In his youth, Felix Adler was being trained to be a rabbi like his father, Samuel Adler, the rabbi of the Reform Jewish Temple Emanu-El in New York. As part of his education, he enrolled at the University of Heidelberg, where he was influenced by neo-Kantian philosophy. He was especially drawn to the Kantian ideas that one could not prove the existence or non-existence of deities or immortality, and that morality could be established independently of theology.

During this time, he was also exposed to the moral problems caused by the exploitation of women and labor. These experiences laid the intellectual groundwork for the Ethical movement. Upon his return from Germany in 1873, he shared his ethical vision with his father's congregation through a sermon. Due to the negative reaction he elicited, it became his first and last sermon as a rabbi-in-training. Instead, he took up a professorship at Cornell University and in 1876 gave a follow-up sermon that led to the 1877 founding of the New York Society for Ethical Culture, which was the first of its kind. By 1886, similar societies had sprouted up in Philadelphia, Chicago, and St. Louis.

These societies all adopted the same statement of principles:

- The belief that morality is independent of theology;
- The affirmation that new moral problems have arisen in modern industrial society that have not been adequately dealt with by the world's religions;
- The duty to engage in philanthropy in the advancement of morality;
- The belief that self-reform should go in lock step with social reform;
- The establishment of republican rather than monarchical governance of Ethical societies
- The agreement that educating the young is the most important aim.

In effect, the movement responded to the religious crisis of the time by replacing theology with unadulterated morality. It aimed to "disentangle moral ideas from religious doctrines, metaphysical systems, and ethical theories, and to make them an independent force in personal life and social relations." Adler was also particularly critical of the religious emphasis on creed, believing it to be the source of sectarian bigotry. He, therefore, attempted to provide a universal fellowship devoid of ritual and ceremony for those who would otherwise be divided by creeds. For the same reasons, the movement also adopted a neutral position on religious beliefs, advocating neither atheism nor theism, agnosticism nor deism.

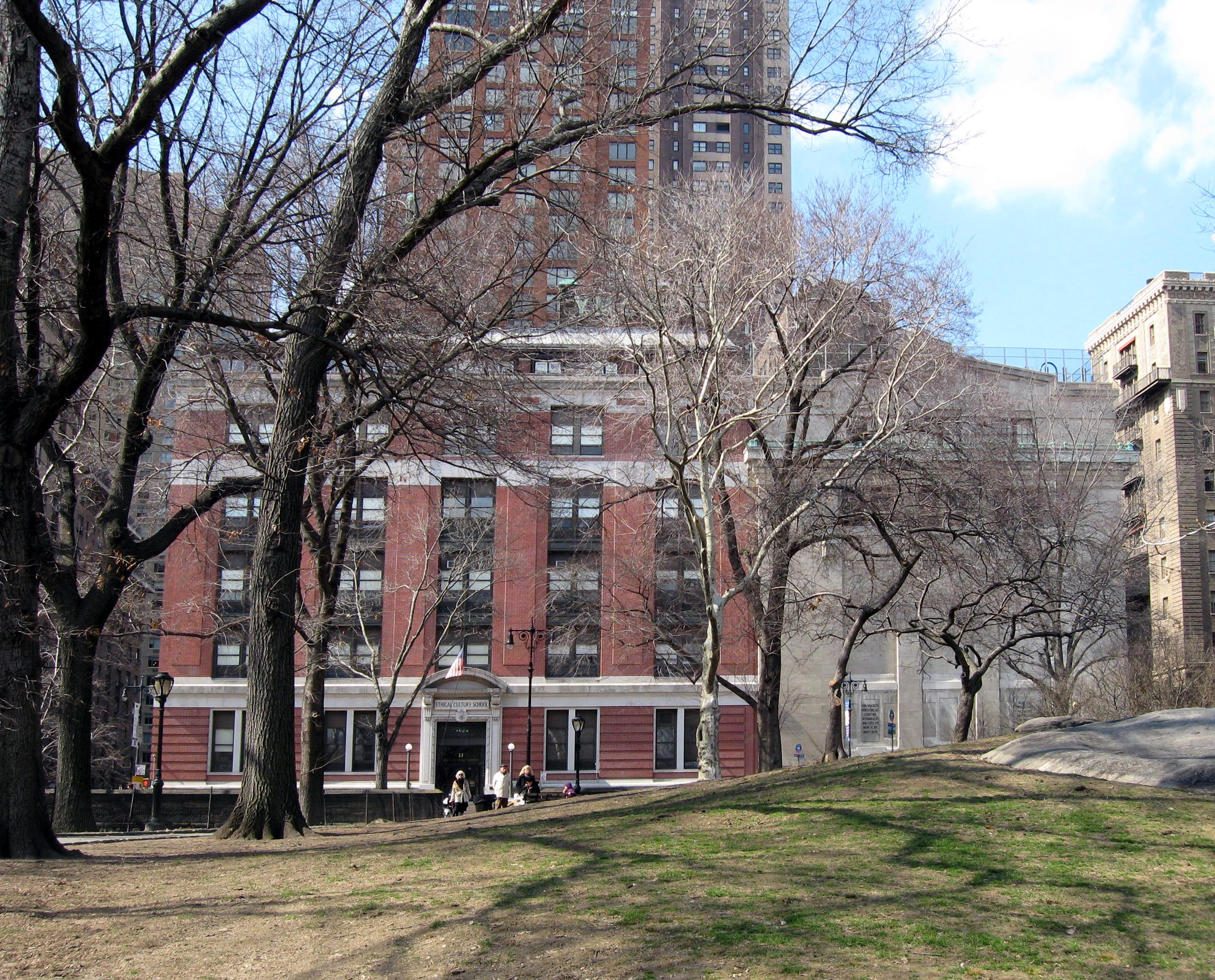
Ethical Culture School (red) and Ethical Culture Society (white) buildings.

The Adlerian emphasis on "deed not creed" translated into several public service projects. The year after it was founded, the New York Society started a kindergarten, a district nursing service, and a tenement-house building company. Later, they opened the Ethical Culture School, then called the "Workingman's School," a Sunday school and a summer home for children. Other ethical societies soon followed suit with similar projects. Unlike the philanthropic efforts of the established religious institutions of the time, the Ethical societies did not attempt to proselytize those they helped. They rarely tried to convert anyone. New members had to be sponsored by existing members, and women were not allowed to join until 1893. They also resisted formalization, though they slowly adopted certain traditional practices, like Sunday meetings and life cycle ceremonies, yet did so in a modern humanistic context. In 1893, the four existing societies unified under the umbrella organization, the American Ethical Union (AEU).

After some initial success, the movement stagnated until after World War II. In 1946, efforts were made to revitalize, and societies were created in New Jersey and Washington D.C., along with the inauguration of the Encampment for Citizenship. By 1968, there were thirty societies with a total national membership of over 5,500. However, the renewed movement differed from its predecessor in a few ways. The newer groups were being created in suburban locales and often to provide alternative Sunday schools for children, with adult activities as an afterthought.

There was also a greater focus on organization and bureaucracy, along with an inward turn emphasizing the needs of the group members over the more general social issues that had initially concerned Adler. The result was a transformation of American ethical societies into something much more akin to small Christian congregations in which the minister's most pressing concern is to tend to their flock.

In the 21st century, the movement attempted to revitalize itself through social media and involvement with other Humanist organizations, with mixed success. As of 2014, there were fewer than 10,000 official members of the Ethical movement.

=== In Britain ===
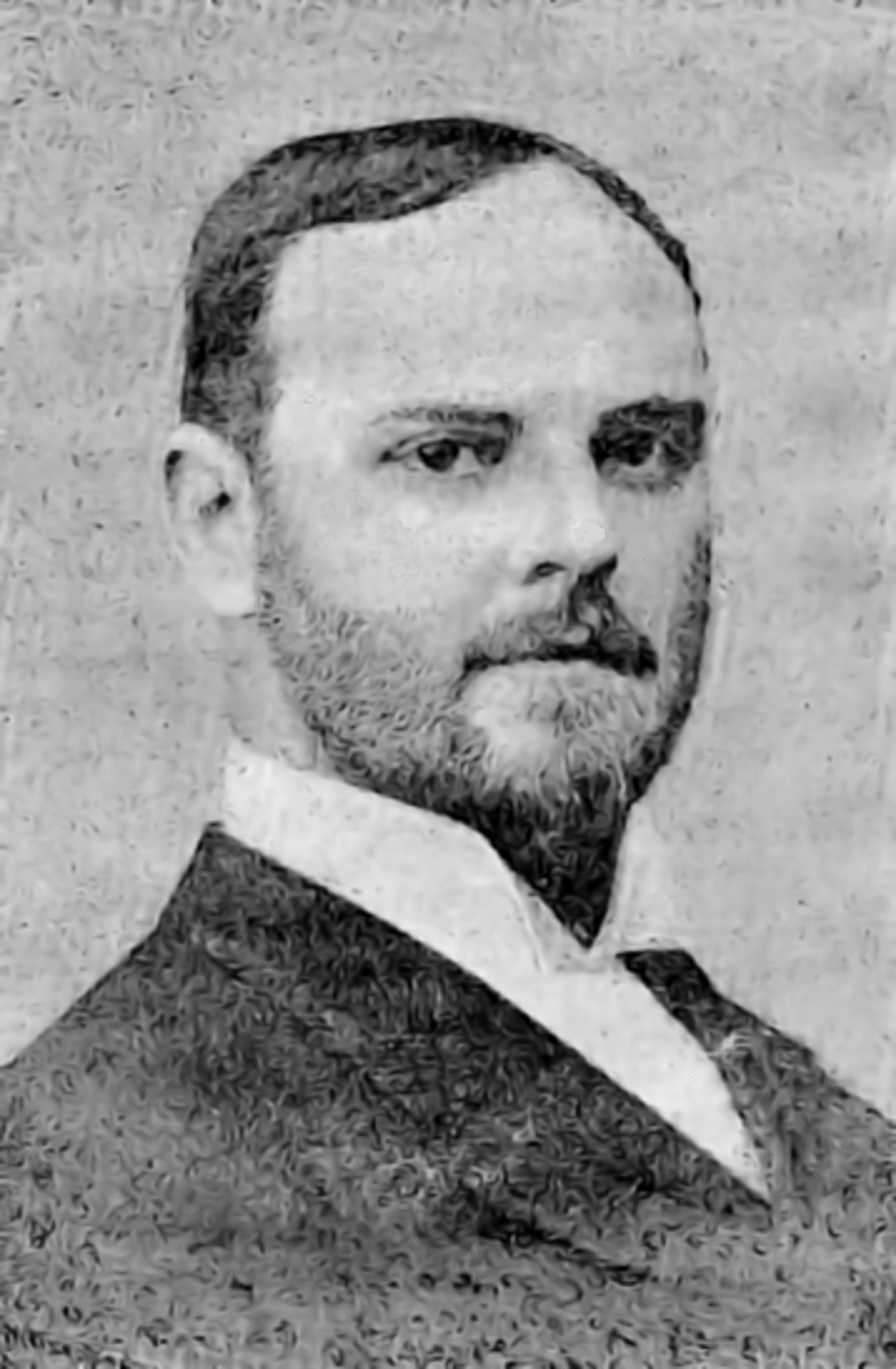
Stanton Coit led the Ethical movement in Britain.

In 1885, the ten-year-old American Ethical Culture movement helped to stimulate similar social activity in Great Britain when American sociologist John Graham Brooks distributed pamphlets by Chicago ethical society leader William Salter to a group of British philosophers, including Bernard Bosanquet, John Henry Muirhead, and John Stuart MacKenzie.

One of Felix Adler's colleagues, Stanton Coit, visited them in London to discuss the "aims and principles" of their American counterparts. In 1886, the first British ethical society was founded. Coit took over the leadership of South Place for a few years. Ethical societies flourished in Britain. By 1896, the four London societies formed the Union of Ethical Societies, and between 1905 and 1910, there were over fifty societies in Great Britain, seventeen of which were affiliated with the Union. This rapid growth was partly due to Coit, who left his role as leader of South Place in 1892 after being denied the power and authority he was vying for.

Because he was firmly entrenched in British ethicism, Coit remained in London and formed the West London Ethical Society, which was almost entirely under his control. Coit worked quickly to shape the West London society not only around Ethical Culture but also the trappings of religious practice, renaming the society in 1914 to the Ethical Church; he did this because he subscribed to a personal theory of using "theological terms in a humanistic sense" to make the Ethical movement appealing to irreligious people with otherwise strong cultural attachments to religion, such as cultural Christians. Coit transformed his meetings into "services," and their space into something akin to a church. In a series of books, Coit also began to argue for transforming the Anglican Church into an Ethical Church while holding up the virtue of ethical ritual. He felt that the Anglican Church was in the unique position to harness the natural moral impulse that stemmed from society itself, as long as the Church replaced theology with science, abandoned supernatural beliefs, expanded its Bible to include a cross-cultural selection of ethical literature and reinterpreted its creeds and liturgy in light of modern ethics and psychology. His attempt to reform the Anglican church failed, and ten years after he died in 1944, the Ethical Church building was sold to the Roman Catholic Church.

During Stanton Coit's lifetime, the Ethical Church was never officially affiliated with the Union of Ethical Societies, nor did South Place. In 1920, the Union of Ethical Societies changed its name to the Ethical Union. Harold Blackham, who had taken over leadership of the London Ethical Church, consciously sought to remove the church-like trappings of the Ethical movement and advocated a simple creed of humanism that was not akin to a religion. He promoted the merger of the Ethical Union with the Rationalist Press Association and the South Place Ethical Society, and, in 1957, a Humanist Council was set up to explore amalgamation. Although issues over charitable status prevented a full amalgamation, the Ethical Union under Blackham changed its name in 1967 to become the British Humanist Association, establishing humanism as the principal organizing force for non-religious morals and secularist advocacy in Britain. The BHA was the legal successor body to the Union of Ethical Societies.

Between 1886 and 1927, seventy-four ethical societies were started in Great Britain, although this rapid growth did not last long. The numbers declined steadily throughout the 1920s and early 30s until only ten societies were left in 1934. By 1954, there were only four. The situation became such that, in 1971, sociologist Colin Campbell even suggested that one could say "that when the South Place Ethical Society discussed changing its name to the South Place Humanist Society in 1969, the English Ethical movement ceased to exist."

The organizations spawned by the 19th-century Ethical movement would later live on as the British humanist movement. The South Place Ethical Society eventually changed its name to Conway Hall Ethical Society, after Moncure D. Conway, and is typically known as simply "Conway Hall." In 2017, the British Humanist Association changed its name to Humanists UK. Both organizations are part of Humanists International, founded by Harold Blackham in 1952 as the International Humanist and Ethical Union.

=== In Germany ===
Inspired by Adler's work in the United States and Coit's in the UK, a German Society for Ethical Culture was formed in Berlin by Wilhelm Foerster and Georg von Gizycki, and had as prominent members and organizers figures such as Friedrich W. Foerster, as well as August Döring, Ferdinand Tönnies, Friedrich Jodl, Theobald Ziegler, and Johannes Unold. It reached its peak in 1895, until the death of Gizycki precipitated its gradual decline, and momentum in the wider German secular movement largely shifted to the German Freethinkers League, founded in 1881, which shared many of the ethical societies' values and goals. The German Ethical Movement produced two regular journals: the Mitteilungen der Deutschen Gesellschaft für Ethik (Berlin 1894–95) and Ethische Kultur: Wochenschrift für Sozial-ethische Reformen (Ethical Culture: Weekly Journal for Social-Ethical Reforms).

Whereas in the UK the Ethical movement organically evolved into a humanist movement, the German movement saw no such gradual transition. After the Freethinkers were programmatically stamped out and had their leaders executed by the Nazis, the Ethical/humanist movement in Germany would not reform until after German reunification in 1991. The humanist association Humanistischer Verband Deutschlands was founded in 1993 to promote humanism.

== Ethical perspective ==
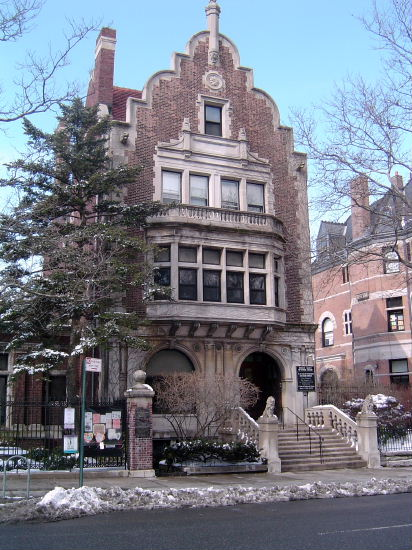
Brooklyn Society for Ethical Culture building on Prospect Park West, originally designed by architect William Tubby as a home for William H. Childs (inventor of Bon Ami Cleaning Powder)

While Ethical Culturists generally share common beliefs about what constitutes ethical behavior and the good, individuals are encouraged to develop their own personal understanding of these ideas. This does not mean that Ethical Culturists condone moral relativism, which would relegate ethics to mere preferences or social conventions. Ethical principles are viewed as being related to deep truths about the way the world works, and hence not arbitrary. However, it is recognized that complexities render the understanding of ethical nuances subject to continued dialogue, exploration, and learning.

While the founder of Ethical Culture, Felix Adler, was a transcendentalist, Ethical Culturists may have a variety of understandings as to the theoretical origins of ethics. Key to the founding of Ethical Culture was the observation that too often disputes over religious or philosophical doctrines have distracted people from actually living ethically and doing good. Consequently, "Deed before creed" has long been a motto of the movement.

== Organizational model ==
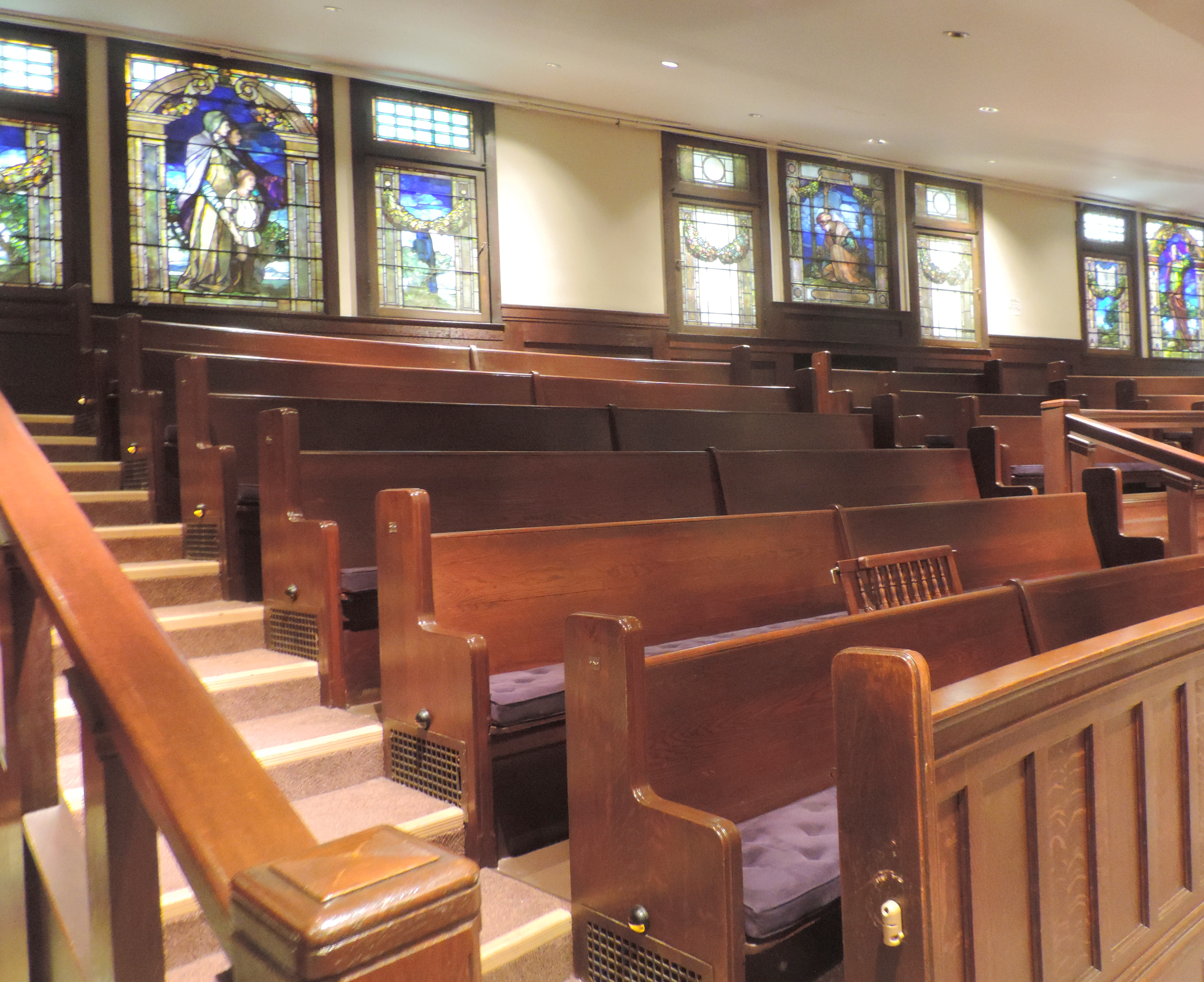
Pews and stained glass

Functionally, the Ethical Societies are organized in a similar manner to churches or synagogues and are headed by "leaders" as clergy. Their founders had suspected this would be a successful model for spreading secular morality. As a result, an Ethical Society typically would have Sunday morning meetings, offer moral instruction for children and teens, and do charitable work and social action. They may offer a variety of educational and other programs. They conduct weddings, commitment ceremonies, baby namings, and memorial services.

Individual Ethical Society members may or may not believe in a deity or regard Ethical Culture as their religion. Felix Adler said "Ethical Culture is religious to those who are religiously minded, and merely ethical to those who are not so minded." The movement does consider itself a religion in the sense that

Religion is that set of beliefs and/or institutions, behaviors and emotions which bind human beings to something beyond their individual selves and foster in its adherents a sense of humility and gratitude that, in turn, sets the tone of one’s world-view and requires certain behavioral dispositions relative to that which transcends personal interests.

The Ethical Culture 2003 ethical identity statement states:

It is a chief belief of Ethical religion that if we relate to others in a way that brings out their best, we will at the same time elicit the best in ourselves. By the "best" in each person, we refer to his or her unique talents and abilities that affirm and nurture life. We use the term "spirit" to refer to a person’s unique personality and to the love, hope, and empathy that exists in human beings. When we act to elicit the best in others, we encourage the growing edge of their ethical development, their perhaps as-yet untapped but inexhaustible worth.

Since around 1950, the Ethical Culture movement has been increasingly identified as part of the modern Humanist movement. Specifically, in 1952, the American Ethical Union, the national umbrella organization for Ethical Culture societies in the United States, became one of the founding member organizations of the International Humanist and Ethical Union.

In the United Kingdom, the ethical societies consciously rejected the "church model" in the mid-20th century, while still providing services like weddings, funerals, and namings on a secular basis.

== Key ideas ==
While Ethical Culture does not regard its founder's views as necessarily the final word, Adler identified focal ideas that remain important within Ethical Culture. These ideas include:

- Human Worth and Uniqueness – All people are taken to have inherent worth, not dependent on the value of what they do. They are deserving of respect and dignity, and their unique gifts are to be encouraged and celebrated.
- Eliciting the Best – "Always act so as to Elicit the best in others, and thereby yourself" is as close as Ethical Culture comes to having a Golden Rule.
- Inter-relatedness – Adler used the term The Ethical Manifold to refer to his conception of the universe as made up of myriad unique and indispensable moral agents (individual human beings), each of whom has an inestimable influence on all the others. In other words, we are all interrelated, with each person playing a role in the whole and the whole affecting each person. Our Inter-relatedness is at the heart of ethics.

Many Ethical Societies prominently display a sign that says "The Place Where People Meet to Seek the Highest is Holy Ground".

== Locations ==
New York City metropolitan area

The largest concentration of Ethical Societies is in the New York metropolitan area, including Societies in New York, Manhattan, the Bronx, Brooklyn Society for Ethical Culture, Brooklyn, Queens, Westchester and Nassau County; and New Jersey, such as Bergen and Essex Counties, New Jersey.

U.S. cities

Ethical Societies exist in several U.S. cities and counties, including Austin, Texas; Baltimore; Chapel Hill; Asheville, North Carolina; Chicago; San Jose, California; Philadelphia; St. Louis; St. Peters, Missouri; Washington, D.C.; Lewisburg, Pennsylvania, and Vienna, Virginia.

London

Ethical Societies also exist outside the U.S.: Conway Hall in London is home to the South Place Ethical Society, which was founded in 1787.

== Structure and events ==
Ethical societies are typically led by "Leaders". Leaders are trained and certified (the equivalent of ordination) by the American Ethical Union. Societies engage Leaders, in much the same way that Protestant congregations "call" a minister. Not all Ethical societies have a professional Leader. (In typical usage, the Ethical movement uses upper case to distinguish certified professional Leaders from other leaders.) A board of executives handles day-to-day affairs, and committees of members focus on specific activities and involvements of the society.

Ethical societies usually hold weekly meetings on Sundays, with the main event of each meeting being the "Platform", which involves a half-hour speech by the Leader of the Ethical Society, a member of the society or by guests. Sunday school for minors is also held at most ethical societies concurrent with the Platform.

The American Ethical Union holds an annual AEU Assembly bringing together Ethical societies from across the US.

== Legal challenges ==
The tax status of Ethical Societies as religious organizations has been upheld in court cases in Washington, D.C. (1957), and in Austin, Texas (2003). In challenge to a denial of tax-exempt status, the Texas State Appeals Court decided that "the Comptroller's test was unconstitutionally underinclusive and that the Ethical Society should have qualified for the requested tax exemptions... Because the Comptroller's test fails to include the whole range of belief systems that may, in our diverse and pluralistic society, merit the First Amendment's protection..."

== Advocates ==
British Prime Minister Ramsay MacDonald was a strong supporter of the British Ethical movement, having been a Christian earlier in his life. He was a member of the Ethical Church and the Union of Ethical Societies (now Humanists UK), a regular attender at South Place Ethical Society. During his time involved with the Ethical movement, he chaired the annual meeting of the Ethical Union on multiple occasions and wrote for Stanton Coit's Ethical World journal.

The British critic and mountaineer Leslie Stephen was a prominent supporter of Ethical Culture in the UK, serving multiple terms as President of the West London Ethical Society, and was involved in the creation of the Union of Ethical Societies.

Albert Einstein was a supporter of Ethical Culture. On the seventy-fifth anniversary of the New York Society for Ethical Culture, in 1951, he noted that the idea of Ethical Culture embodied his personal conception of what is most valuable and enduring in religious idealism. Humanity requires such a belief to survive, Einstein argued. He observed, "Without 'ethical culture' there is no salvation for humanity."

First Lady Eleanor Roosevelt was a regular attendee at the New York Society for Ethical Culture at a time when humanism was beginning to coalesce in its modern-day form, and it was there that she developed friendships with the leading humanists and Ethical Culturists of her day. She collaborated with Al Black, Ethical Society leader, in the creation of her nationwide Encampment of Citizenship. She maintained her involvement with the movement as figures on both sides of the Atlantic began to advocate for organizing under the banner of secular humanism. She provided a cover endorsement for the first edition of Humanism as the Next Step (1954) by Lloyd and Mary Morain, saying simply that it was "A significant book."

== See also ==
- Arthur E. Briggs, Los Angeles City Council member, 1939–41, Ethical Society leader
- British Humanist Association, which inherited many British ethical societies
- International Moral Education Congress
- Religious humanism
- Unitarian Universalism
- Washington Ethical Society v. District of Columbia
