= Fellowship of Humanity v. County of Alameda =

Organization

Fellowship of Humanity v. County of Alameda was a 1957 California Courts of Appeal case in the Fellowship of Humanity, an organization of humanists, sought a tax exemption from Alameda County, California on the ground that they used their property "solely and exclusively for religious worship." Despite the group's nontheistic beliefs, the court determined that the activities of the Fellowship of Humanity, which included weekly Sunday meetings, were analogous to the activities of theistic churches and thus entitled to an exemption.

== Significance ==
Along with Washington Ethical Society v. District of Columbia, this was one of the earliest cases establishing the right in the U.S. of nontheistic institutions that function like traditional theistic religious institutions to be treated similarly to theistic religious institutions under the law.

This case was cited by Justice Hugo Black in the decision for Torcaso v. Watkins, in an obiter dictum listing "secular humanism" as being among "religions in this country which do not teach what would generally be considered a belief in the existence of God."

The Fellowship of Humanity case itself referred to humanism but did not mention the term secular humanism. Nonetheless, this case was cited by Justice Black to justify the inclusion of Secular Humanism in the list of religions in his note. Presumably Justice Black added the word secular to emphasize the non-theistic nature of the Fellowship of Humanity and distinguish their brand of humanism from that associated with, for example, Christian humanism.

Black's statement was somewhat misleading in that Fellowship of Humanity v. County of Alameda did not address the question of whether the secular humanist ideals of the Fellowship of Humanity were religious; it merely determined that Fellowship of Humanity functioned like a church and so was entitled to similar protections. Subsequent cases such as Peloza v. Capistrano School District have clarified that "neither the Supreme Court nor this circuit, has ever held that evolutionism or secular humanism are 'religions' for Establishment Clause purposes." Unlike the question of tax exemption, Establishment Clause issues rest on whether or not ideas themselves are primarily religious.

The decision for a subsequent case, Kalka v. Hawk et al., offered this commentary:

The Court's statement in Torcaso does not stand for the proposition that humanism, no matter in what form and no matter how practiced, amounts to a religion under the First Amendment. The Court offered no test for determining what system of beliefs qualified as a "religion" under the First Amendment. The most one may read into the Torcaso footnote is the idea that a particular non-theistic group calling itself the "Fellowship of Humanity" qualified as a religious organization under California law.

== Rationale for decision ==
Rationale for the decision included the following. First, the court argued that the state is not allowed to focus on the content of belief, but only on its function:

It is perfectly obvious that any type of statutory exemption that discriminates between types of religious belief--that discriminates... on the basis of the content of such belief--would offend both the federal and state constitutional provisions... Under the constitutional provision the state has no power to decide the validity of the beliefs held by the group involved... Thus the only inquiry in such a case is the objective one of whether or not the belief occupies the same place in the lives of its holders that the orthodox beliefs occupy in the lives of believing majorities, and whether a given group that claims the exemption conducts itself the way groups conceded to be religious conduct themselves. The content of the belief, under such test, is not a matter of governmental concern... Under this test the belief or nonbelief in a Supreme Being is a false factor... "religion" fills a void that exists in the lives of most men. Regardless of why a particular belief suffices, as long as it serves this purpose, it must be accorded the same status of an orthodox religious belief.

Second, the court argued that the tax exemption for churches must be justified in terms of non-religious aspects:

Direct tax subsidies of any church or sect or of all churches and sects are undoubtedly prohibited by the First Amendment to the United States Constitution... A tax exemption is, obviously, an indirect subsidy... it is not easy to justify logically the tax exemption provisions... a logical and legal justification of such provisions must be found, and... in interpreting such provisions the court should be very careful not to limit them by such a narrow construction that by the very limitations imposed, constitutionality is adversely affected... It is sound public policy to encourage, by tax exemption as well as by direct subsidy, private undertakings in the fields that are properly within the realm of governmental responsibility. Thus, welfare, charitable and private educational grants and subsidies are valid. All churches that warrant the exemption perform some of these tasks. Therefore, churches can be indirectly subsidized for the performance of these tasks. But this indirect subsidy is not for the activities that are peculiarly religious in the sense of dogma or doctrine, but for the many other things all churches do... If the words "religious worship" are given a narrow, limited meaning, so as to require a belief in and adoration of a Supreme Being, then grave doubts would exist as to the constitutionality of the section... If the state cannot constitutionally subsidize religion under the First Amendment, then it cannot subsidize theism. If the state can constitutionally subsidize those functions of religious groups which are not related to "religion" in its narrow sense, then it must subsidize those nontheistic groups which perform the same functions.
