= First Humanist Society of New York =

Humanist society

In 1929 Charles Francis Potter founded the First Humanist Society of New York whose advisory board included Julian Huxley, John Dewey, Albert Einstein, and Thomas Mann. Potter was a minister from the Unitarian tradition and in 1930 he and his wife, Clara Cook Potter, published Humanism: A New Religion. Throughout the 1930s Potter was a well-known advocate of women's rights, access to birth control, "civil divorce laws", and an end to capital punishment.

== See also ==
- Religious Humanism
- Fellowship of Humanity
