= Charles Francis Potter =

American minister (1885–1962)

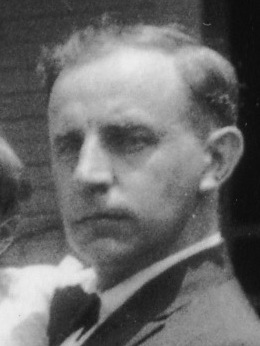
- Potter in 1925 during the Scopes Trial
- Born: October 28, 1885; Marlboro, Massachusetts, US
- Died: October 4, 1962 (aged 76)
- Education: Bucknell University MA 1916, Newton Theological Institution BD 1913, STM 1917
- Occupations: Unitarian Minister, theologian, author

Charles Francis Potter (October 28, 1885 – October 4, 1962) was an American Unitarian minister, theologian, and author.

In 1923 and 1924, he became nationally known through a series of debates with John Roach Straton, a fundamentalist Christian. They were soon published in four volumes entitled The Battle Over the Bible, Evolution versus Creation, The Virgin Birth - Fact or Fiction? and Was Christ Both Man and God?

== Scopes Trial ==
In 1925 he was adviser on the Bible to Clarence Darrow in his defense of John Thomas Scopes, a schoolteacher who was charged with teaching evolution in his classes.

== Education ==
He was born in Marlborough, Massachusetts, where his father was a shoe-factory worker, and received his education at Bucknell University, Brown University and Newton Theological Institution.

Beginning his career as a Baptist minister, his developing liberal theological views led him to resign his ministry and convert to Unitarianism serving in a number of congregations before being called to the West Side Unitarian Church in New York City in 1920. However, he resigned his position in 1925 because, he explained, even a liberal pulpit did not afford all the necessary freedom of expression. The next year he took a position of professor of comparative religion at Antioch College.

== Humanism ==
In 1927 Potter returned to the ministry at the Church of the Divine Paternity, a Universalist congregation on Manhattan's Upper West Side. In 1929, his progressive ideas led him to resign his post and found the First Humanist Society of New York, whose advisory board included Julian Huxley, John Dewey, Albert Einstein, and Thomas Mann. Together with Dewey, Potter was one of the original 34 signers of the first Humanist Manifesto in 1933.

"Humanism is not the abolition of religion," Potter was quoted as saying, "but the beginning of real religion. By freeing religion of supernaturalism, it will release tremendous reserves of hitherto thwarted power. Man has waited too long for God to do what man ought to do himself and is fully capable of doing." It was to be, he said, "a religion of common sense; and the chief end of man is to improve himself, both as an individual and as a race." (Note: "Charles Potter, clergyman, dead - retired Unitarian minister began Humanist Society". New York Times. October 5, 1962. The information in the obituary conflict somewhat with.)

== Social justice ==
Potter became a vocal advocate for social reform, campaigning vigorously against capital punishment, promoting "civil divorce laws," and supporting birth control and women's rights. He was also the founder, in 1938, of the Euthanasia Society of America, helping to raise the issue of euthanasia before the American public.

== Published works ==
- Potter, Charles Francis (1930). The story of religion as told in the lives of its leaders. London: Harrap. OCLC 504660169.
- Potter, Charles Francis; Potter, Clara Cook (1930). Humanism : a new religion. New York: Simon & Schuster. OCLC 740902471.
- Potter, Charles Francis (1933). Is that in the Bible?. Garden City. OCLC 1004558343.
- Potter, Charles Francis (1933). Humanizing religion. New York: Harper and Brothers. OCLC 4837180.
- Potter, Charles Francis (1935). Technique of happiness. New York: Macaulay. OCLC 1420410.
- Potter, Charles Francis (1939). Beyond the senses. New York: Doubleday, Doran. OCLC 3756979.
- Potter, Charles Francis (1950). Creative personality : the next step in evolution. New York: Funk and Wagnalls. OCLC 751662066.
- Potter, Charles Francis (1951). The Preacher and I : an autobiography. New York: Crown. OCLC 750627276.
- Potter, Charles Francis (1954). The faiths men live by. New York: Prentice-Hall.
- Potter, Charles Francis (1958). The great religious leaders. New York: Simon and Schuster. OCLC 1252896.
- Potter, Charles Francis (1962). The lost years of Jesus revealed - from the Dead Sea scrolls and the Nag-Hamadi discoveries (2 ed.). New York: Ballantine. ISBN 0-449-13039-8.
- Potter, Charles Francis (1962). Tongue tanglers. Cleveland: World Publishing. OCLC 1010963845.

== See also ==
- Religious Humanism
