= Samuel Adler (rabbi) =

German-American Reform rabbi (1809–1891)

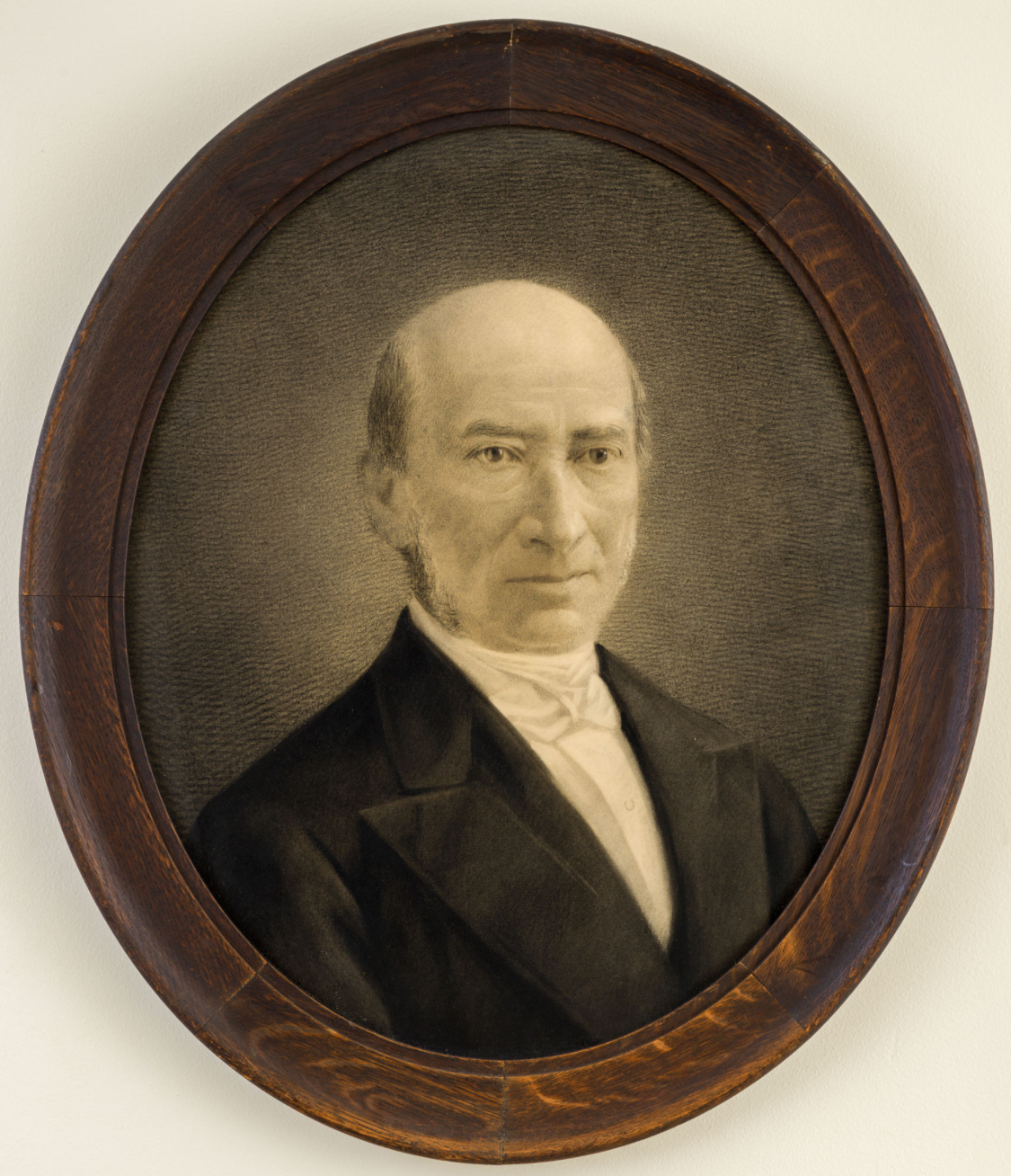
- Born: December 3, 1809; Worms, Mont-Tonnerre, First French Empire (present-day Germany)
- Died: June 9, 1891 (aged 81); New York City, U.S.
- Resting place: Salem Fields Cemetery, Brooklyn, New York
- Citizenship: United States (1856)
- Education: University of Bonn; University of Giessen
- Occupation: Rabbi
- Spouse: Henrietta Frankfurter
- Children: Felix Adler (son), Isaac Adler (son), Sarah Adler Goldman (daughter)
- Relatives: Hetty Goldman (grand-daughter)

Samuel Adler (December 3, 1809 – June 9, 1891) was a leading German-American Reform rabbi, Talmudist, and author.

== Early life ==
Samuel Adler was born on December 3, 1809, in Worms, Confederation of the Rhine (present-day Germany). He received his early religious education from his father Isaac, who was one of the associate rabbis in Worms and instructed him in Hebrew and the Biblical and Rabbinic literature of the Jews. When Rabbi Isaac Adler died on December 23, 1822, thirteen-year-old Samuel, his four young siblings, and their mother were left in straitened circumstances. In spite of innumerable difficulties and extreme privation, Samuel continued his studies at the yeshivot in Worms and Frankfurt-am-Main, while concurrently pursuing a regular course of classical and general studies at the high schools of those two cities.

After graduating from the Frankfurt Gymnasium, Adler entered, in 1831, the University of Bonn and later that of Gießen, where he studied Oriental languages and philosophy for five years and awarded the Doctor of Philosophy in 1836.

== Career ==
Adler assumed his first official appointment as a preacher and assistant rabbi in Worms. In 1842, he was elected rabbi of the Jewish congregations in Alzey and remained in this position until 1857.

In 1856, Adler moved to the United States. At the beginning of 1857, he received an offer from Temple Emanu-El in New York City to succeed Leo Merzbacher—recently deceased—as its rabbi. At the time, Temple Emanu-El was the leading Reform congregation in the United States. Adler accepted the call and moved to New York in March 1857. He remained active as the spiritual head of Emanu-El until 1874, when he was made rabbi emeritus and relieved from active work. He was succeeded by Gustav Gottheil. During his tenure, Adler continued conducting synagogue services in German (in preference to the traditional Hebrew), for the congregation mainly consisted of prosperous German immigrant families. Adler also revised the German prayerbook introduced by Merzbacher and authored the bilingual A Guide to the Instruction in the Israelitish Religion (Leitfaden für den israelitischen Religionsunterricht) for use in Emanu El's Hebrew Sunday school.

Adler was not merely a thorough Talmudic scholar but also had a considerable command of the knowledge of various issues concerning the Jews, including their history, religion, and literature. Adler was committed to translating his scholarship into social action.

During the twenty-one years of his career in Germany, he campaigned for the emancipation of the Jews from their civil disabilities, especially for the removal of the humiliating oath known as the more judaico. Adler succeeded in having the Jewish religion taught on equal terms with Protestantism and Catholicism in the lower and higher schools of Worms. He pushed for the recognition of gender equality within Judaism. Through his influence, the mechitza, which had segregated the women from the men in the ancient synagogue of Worms, was leveled, allowing the sexes to sit with each other during services.

Adler gave special attention to improving the religious instruction of the young, both in the city and the rural schools he supervised. He sought to enhance the order, solemnity, and dignity of public worship and was instrumental in founding several new charitable institutions. Above all, with patience and zeal, he persuaded his congregations to let go of the deadening influence of religious literalism. In this endeavor, he frequently drew upon the storehouse of his great Talmudic learning for the arguments that he used in his struggle for progress, always seeking to rest the reformation of manners upon a basis of inward conviction and favoring a gradual transformation rather than an abrupt transition from the old to the new.

He belonged to what may be called the historico-critical school of Jewish theology. He was a highly-respected citizen of New York, keeping in touch with modern thought and progress and accomplishing a vast amount of good. He contributed scholarly articles to several learned periodicals; for example, Contributions to the History of Sadduceeism, Jewish Conference Papers, and Benedictions. Some of these the author collected and published under the Hebrew title Kobez 'al Yad (Collections) in 1886, mainly as a souvenir for his friends.

== Death and legacy ==
Adler died on June 9, 1891, in Manhattan, New York, and rests in Salem Fields Cemetery of Brooklyn, New York. His extensive library of rabbinical literature was donated by his family to Hebrew Union College, Cincinnati.

== Family ==
Adler married Henrietta Frankfurter.

- His son Felix Adler (1851–1933), was the founder of the Society for Ethical Culture.
- His son Isaac Adler was a physician and educator.
- His daughter Sarah Adler Goldman, married to Julius Goldman (1852–1909), German Jew of the Goldman–Sachs family.
- His grand-daughter Hetty Goldman (1881–1972), was one of the first female archaeologists to undertake excavations in Greece and the Middle East.

== Sources ==
- Adler, Samuel (1860). A Guide to the Instruction in the Israelitish Religion - Leitfaden für den israelitischen Religionsunterricht. Thalmessinger, Cahn and Benedicks. New York.
- Cohen, Getzel M.; Joukowsky, Martha Sharp (2006). Breaking Ground: Pioneering Women Archaeologists. University of Michigan Press. p. 299. ISBN 0472031740.
- Krone, Kerstin von der (2020). "Samuel Adler in New York. Nineteenth-Century Jewish Education in Transatlantic and Translational Perspective". In Isensee, Fanny; Oberdorf, Andreas; Töpper, Daniel (eds.). Transatlantic Encounters in History of Education: Translations and Trajectories from a German-American Perspective. New York: Routledge. pp. 135–150. doi:10.4324/9780429297243. ISBN 9780429297243. S2CID 241263144.

Attribution
