= Isaac Adler (physician) =

American physician (c. 1849–1918)

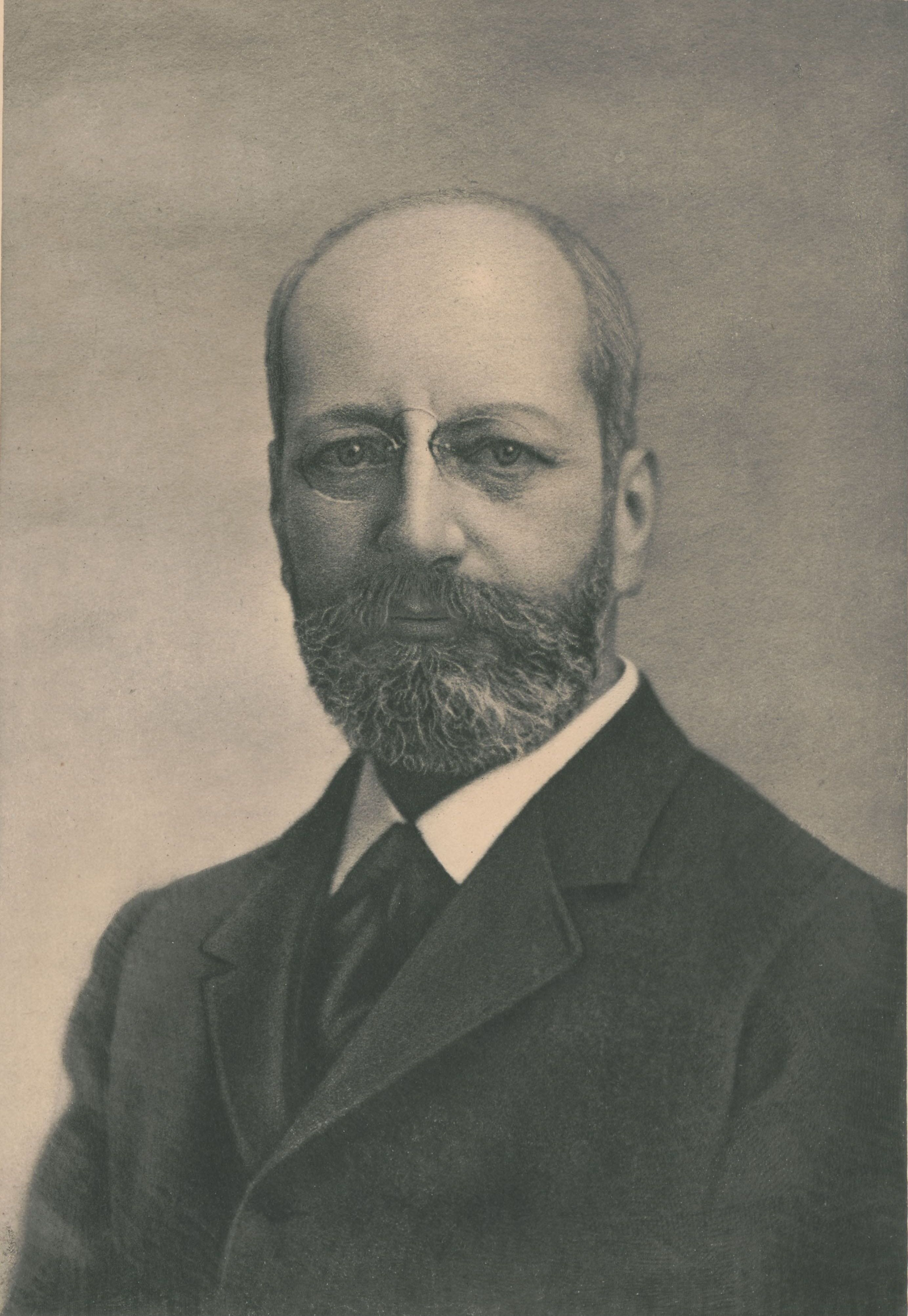
Isaac Adler

Isaac Adler (c. 1849–1918) was a German-American physician known for his published descriptions of lung cancer cases in the early 20th century.

== Early life ==
Isaac Adler was born in Alzey, Grand Duchy of Hesse, in about 1849 to Henriette Frankfurter and noted rabbi Samuel Adler. In 1857, the family emigrated to the United States. Adler received an undergraduate degree from Columbia College in 1868, then his M.D. in Heidelberg, Germany, in 1871.

== Medical career ==
Beginning in 1875, Adler worked as a physician at German Hospital (now Lenox Hill Hospital) in New York City. In 1892, Adler was appointed professor of clinical psychology at the New York Polyclinic Medical School. In 1898, he was elected consulting physician at Montefiore Home.

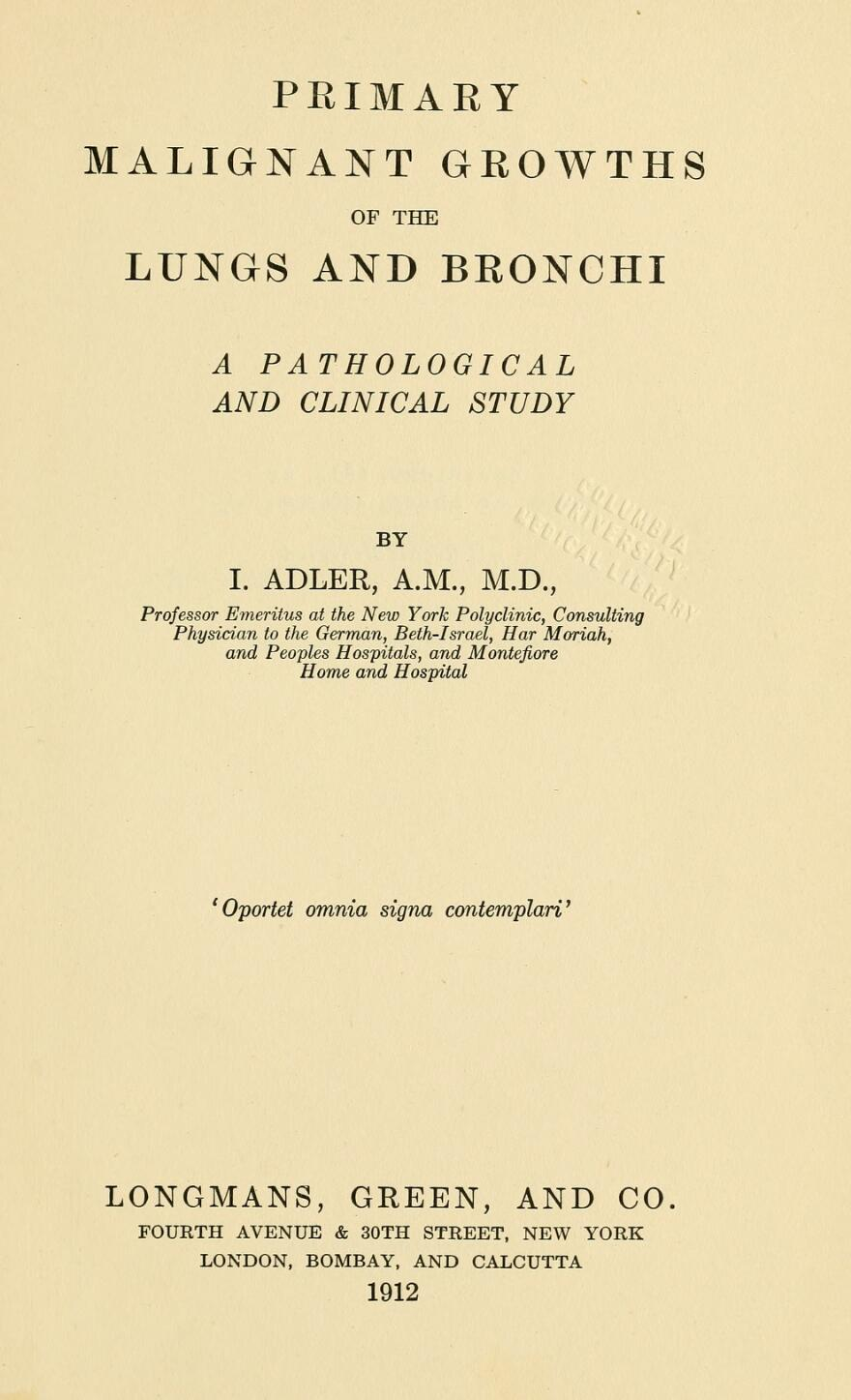
The front page of Adler's 1912 book

In 1912, Adler published the work for which he is best known, "Primary Malignant Growths of the Lungs and Bronchi". In the first review of lung cancer, previously a rare disease, Adler listed 374 known cases from various European registries. Adler noted "a decided increase" in lung cancer, and speculated that tobacco or alcohol could be involved. Adler suggested that lung cancer was frequently misdiagnosed as tuberculosis.

== Personal life ==
Adler married Frida Grumbacher on May 24, 1874. Adler died at his New York City home on May 4, 1918.

== Works ==
- "Notes on Some Experiments Concerning Cell Emigration" (1890), in International Contributions to Medical Literature: Festschrift in Honor of Abraham Jacobi, pp. 309–317.
- "The Diagnosis of Malignant Tumors of the Lungs" (1896), New York Medical Journal, vol. 63, p. 173.
- Die Diagnose der primären bösartigen Geschwülste der Lungen und Bronchien (1909), pp. 28–48.
- Primary Malignant Growths of the Lungs and Bronchi: A Pathological and Clinical Study (1912). London: Longmans, Green.
- "Some Reactions of Blood Vessels to Certain Chemicals" (1916), Journal of Pharmacology and Experimental Therapeutics, vol. 8, pp. 297–324.
