= Fellowship of Humanity =

Humanist church

The Fellowship of Humanity is a humanist church in Oakland, California, founded in 1935 by Reverend A. D. Faupell as part of the American Religious Humanism movement. It was an offshoot of the First Unitarian Church of Oakland, where A. D. Faupell had been teaching Sunday school, and was inspired in part by Upton Sinclair’s campaign for governor of California under the banner of EPIC, End Poverty in California. It was one of several "Churches of Humanity" established in the 1930s but is the only one that has survived into the 21st century. It is the first and oldest affiliate of the American Humanist Association. It is currently described as a "Deep Green Humanist Church vital to progressive infrastructure, inspired by humanitarian ideals, and committed to action for social justice and ecological sanity."

== Fellowship of Humanity v. County of Alameda ==
A footnote in the U.S. Supreme Court case Torcaso v. Watkins referenced Fellowship of Humanity v. County of Alameda, a 1957 case in which the organization sought a tax exemption on the ground that they used their property "solely and exclusively for religious worship." Despite the group's non-theistic beliefs, the court determined that the activities of the Fellowship of Humanity, which included weekly Sunday meetings, were analogous to the activities of theistic churches and thus entitled to an exemption.

== See also ==
- Fellowship of Humanity v. County of Alameda
- Religious Humanism
- First Humanist Society of New York
