= Felix Adler (professor) =

German American ethicist, social reformer and religious leader (1851-1933)

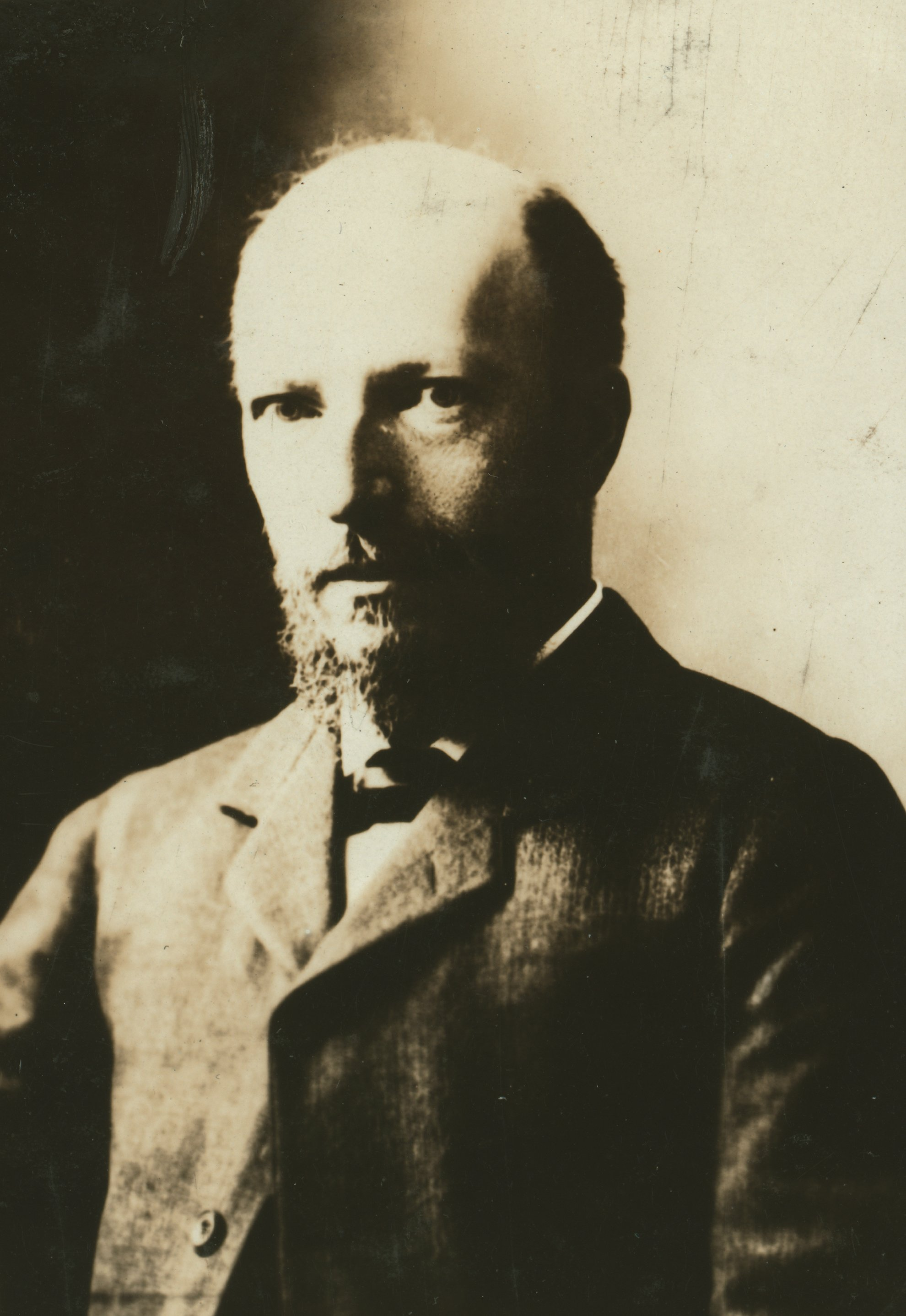
- Felix Adler, c. 1913
- Born: August 13, 1851; Alzey, Grand Duchy of Hesse, German Confederation
- Died: April 24, 1933 (aged 81); New York City, U.S.
- Resting place: Mount Pleasant Cemetery, Hawthorne, New York
- Education: Columbia University (BA); University of Berlin; Heidelberg University (PhD)
- Occupations: Professor of political and social ethics
- Known for: Ethical Culture movement, lecturing on euthanasia
- Spouse: Helen Goldmark (m. 1880)
- Children: 5
- Parents: Samuel Adler (father); Henrietta Frankfurter (mother)
- Relatives: Horace L. Friess (son-in-law)

Signature
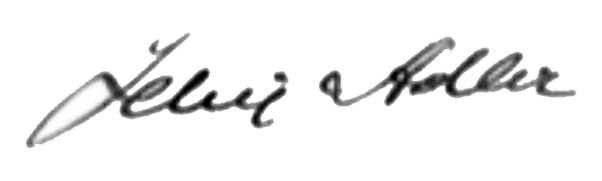

Felix Adler (August 13, 1851 – April 24, 1933) was a German-American professor of political and social ethics, rationalist, influential lecturer on euthanasia, religious leader and social reformer who founded the Ethical Culture movement.

== Early life ==
Felix Adler was born in Alzey, Rhenish Hesse, Grand Duchy of Hesse, Germany, the son of a rabbi, Samuel Adler, a leading figure in European Reform Judaism, and Henrietta Frankfurter. The family immigrated to the United States from Germany when Felix was six years old so that his father could accept the appointment as head rabbi at Temple Emanu-El in New York City.

Adler attended Columbia Grammar & Preparatory School and graduated from Columbia University in 1870 with honors. He continued at Heidelberg University where he studied as part of his training to become a rabbi. He received a PhD from Heidelberg in 1873. While in Germany, he was strongly influenced by neo-Kantianism, especially the notions that one cannot prove or disprove the existence of a deity or immortality, and that morality can be established independently of theology.

== Academic career ==
When Adler returned to New York at the age of twenty-three, he was asked to give a sermon at Temple Emanu-El, where he was meant to follow in his father's footsteps as rabbi of the congregation. His sermon, "The Judaism of the Future", shocked the congregation, as he did not once mention God. Adler introduced his concept of Judaism as a universal religion of morality for all of humankind. The sermon was his first and last at Temple Emanu-El.

In 1874, after it had become clear that he would not become a rabbi, members of his father's congregation helped Adler gain a teaching position at Cornell University as a nonresident Professor of Hebrew and Oriental literature. He was popular with his students, with whom he discussed his novel religious ideas while illuminating contemporary labor struggles and power politics. He was attacked as an atheist for his views, and in 1876 Cornell declined to accept the grant that had paid Adler's salary. In 1902 Adler was given the chair of political and social ethics at Columbia University, where he taught until his death in 1933. There he opposed the formation of a Zionist student club, considering it to be a "divisive force".

== New York Society of Ethical Culture ==
In 1876, Adler, at age 26, was invited to give a lecture expanding upon his themes first presented in the sermon at Temple Emanu-El. On May 15, 1876, he reiterated the need for a religion that united all humankind in moral and social action without the trappings of ritual or creed. To do away with theology and to unite theists, atheists, agnostics and deists, all in the same religious cause, was a revolutionary idea at the time. A few weeks after the sermon, Adler started a series of weekly Sunday lectures. In February 1877, aided by Joseph Seligman, president of Temple Emanu-El, Adler incorporated the Society of Ethical Culture.

Adler talked about "deed, not creed"; he believed good works were the basis of ethical culture. In 1877, the Society founded the District Nursing Department, which organized a team of nurses who visited the homebound sick in poor districts. A year later, in 1878, the Society established a free kindergarten for working people's children. Because it served the working poor, the kindergarten provided basic necessities for the children when needed, such as clothing and hot meals. It evolved into the Ethical Culture Fieldston School.

Well-known as a lecturer and writer, Adler served as a rector for the Ethical Culture School until his death in 1933. Throughout his life, he always looked beyond the immediate concerns of family, labor, and race to the long-term challenge of reconstructing institutions, such as schools and government, to promote greater justice in human relations. Cooperation rather than competition was the higher social value. He gave a series of six lectures on "The Ethics of Marriage" for the Lowell Institute's 1896–1897 season.

Adler was the founding chairman of the National Child Labor Committee in 1904. Lewis Hine was hired as the committee's photographer in 1908. In 1917, Adler served on the Civil Liberties Bureau, which later became the American Civil Liberties Bureau and then the American Civil Liberties Union (ACLU). In 1928, he became president of the Eastern division of the American Philosophical Association. He served on the first executive board of the National Urban League.

== Tenement house reform ==
As a member of the New York State Tenement House Commission, Adler was concerned not only with overcrowding but also by the increase in contagious disease caused by overcrowding. Though not a proponent of free public housing, Adler spoke out about tenement reform and the rents, which he considered exorbitant. Jacob Riis wrote that Adler had "clear incisive questions that went through all subterfuges to the root of things."

In 1885 Adler and others created the Tenement House Building Company in order to build "model" affordable tenements; they rented for $8–$14/month. By 1887 the company had completed six model buildings on the Lower East Side of Manhattan for the sum of $155,000. Critics favored legislation and regulations to improve tenement conditions, but the model tenement was a progressive step.

== American foreign policy ==
By the late 1890s, with the increase in international conflicts, Adler switched his concern from domestic issues to the question of American foreign policy. While some contemporaries viewed the 1898 Spanish–American War as an act to liberate the Cubans from Spanish rule, others perceived the U.S. victories in the Caribbean and the Philippines as the beginning of an expansionist empire. Adler at first supported the war but later expressed concern about American sovereignty over the Philippines and Puerto Rico. He believed that an imperialistic rather than a democratic goal was guiding U.S. foreign policy. Ethical Culture affirms "the supreme worth of the person", and Adler superimposed this tenet on international relations, believing that no single group could lay claim to superior institutions and lifestyle.

Unlike many of his contemporaries during World War I, Adler did not believe that the defeat of the German Empire would make the world safe for democracy. He thought peace depended on representative democratic governments being non-imperialistic and their curbing the arms race. He opposed the Versailles Treaty and the League of Nations. As an alternative, Adler proposed a "Parliament of Parliaments", elected by the legislative bodies of the different nations and representing different classes of people, rather than special interests, so that common interests would prevail over national differences.

== Philosophy ==
Adler developed an original philosophy with a foundation in those of Immanuel Kant and Georg Wilhelm Friedrich Hegel that developed and transformed these roots. He considered philosophy not just a guide of life but a key to improving society and the human condition appropriate to respect for essential human dignity. Rejecting Kant's metaphysics, he embraced his stress on the intrinsic worth and dignity of the person. Combining a supreme moral principle similar to Kant's with his detailed ideas of self-realization, he emphasized the free development of the individual about societal concerns and fellowship. He preceded John Dewey in a concern for the "problems of men" instead of philosophical technicalities. While his ideas shared some aspects of pragmatism, he was better described as "an ethical idealist with great practical reforming zeal" he promoted an idealist version of moral perfectionism. He was, however, realistic and not sentimental, acknowledging that man has done evil knowingly and deliberately.

Adler's ethics combined an appeal to universal principles with moral particularism, which holds that the unique circumstances of a particular case must be carefully considered to determine the ethical choice in that case. Adler believed that moral laws could not be applied similarly to varied and unique individuals but that moral principles applied to all. He saw a need to balance essential general principles with consideration of the particular specific circumstances. He developed his own version of what he called Kant's "formula," which was, "Treat every [person] as a spiritual means to thine own spiritual end and conversely."

He proposed a "supreme ethical rule," which he stated as follows: "So act as to elicit the unique personality in others, and thereby in thyself," or "Act so as to elicit the best in others and thereby in thyself." He thought by doing so, one would transcend both egoism and altruism. He believed that virtue is and must be its reward, or else it is not. He characterized a virtuous act as one "in which the ends of self and of the other are respected and promoted jointly," coordinating Kantian universalistic imperative ethics with a type of perfectionism. He took ethics seriously and felt it "must run like a golden thread through the whole of a [person's] life." He felt consequentialism, particularly utilitarianism, was inappropriate in ethics as it attempts to apply quantitative measures to something of a qualitative nature.

Adler's social philosophy opposed commercialism. He claimed, "The root disease that afflicts the world at the present day is the supremacy of the commercial point of view." His thought prized public works and the use of reason to develop ultimate ethical standards. Adler published such works as Creed and Deed (1878), Moral Instruction of Children (1892), Life and Destiny (1905), The Religion of Duty (1906), Essentials of Spirituality (1908), An Ethical Philosophy of Life (1918), The Reconstruction of the Spiritual Ideal (1925), and Our Part in this World. He made use of ideas from Judaism, as well as the philosophies of Kant and Ralph Waldo Emerson, mixed with specific socialist ideas of his time. He believed that the concept of a personal god was unnecessary and thought that the human personality was the central force of religion. He believed that different people's interpretations of religions were to be respected as religious in themselves. The Ethical Culture movement was open to people of diverse beliefs. Ethical Culture societies were formed in the late nineteenth century in numerous cities in the United States, for instance, Philadelphia and St. Louis.

== Works ==
=== Books ===
- Creed and Deed: A Series of Discourses. New York: G. P. Putnam's Sons. 1880.
- Life and Destiny. New York: McClure, Phillis and Co. 1903.
- The Religion of Duty. New York: McClure, Phillis and Co. 1905.
- Marriage and Divorce. New York: McClure, Phillis and Co. 1905. Updated in 1915 to include a third lecture.
- The Moral Instruction of Children. International Education Series. Vol. 21. New York: D. Appleton and Co. 1892.
- The Essentials of Spirituality. New York: James Pott and Co. 1905.
- World crisis and its meaning. New York: D. Appleton and Co. 1915.
- An Ethical Philosophy of Life: Presented in Its Main Outlines. New York: D. Appleton and Co. 1918.
- Incompatibility In Marriage. New York: D. Appleton and Co. 1920.
- The Punishment of Children. American Home Series. New York: Abingdon Press. 1922.
- The Reconstruction of the Spiritual Ideal: Hibbert Lectures Delivered in Manchester College, Oxford, May 1923. New York: D. Appleton and Co. 1923. OCLC 607376.
- — (1946). Friess, Horace (ed.). Our Part in this World. New York: Columbia University Press.

=== Book chapters ===
- "Some Characteristics of the American Ethical Movement". Fiftieth Anniversary of the Ethical Movement (1876–1926). New York: D. Appleton and Co. 1926. OCLC 2594955.
- — (1911). "Sec. 2, Ch. 1: Principles Which Should Govern the Making of Bequests for Philanthropic Purposes". In Remsen, Daniel S. (ed.). Post-mortem use of Wealth, Including a Consideration of Ante-mortem Gifts. New York: G. P. Putnam's Sons. pp. 89–93.
