= Fellowship of the New Life =

19th century British organisation

- Formation: 1883; 143 years ago
- Founder: Thomas Davidson
- Dissolved: 1898; 128 years ago
- Key people: Edward Carpenter, Havelock Ellis, Edith Lees, Edward R. Pease, Olive Schreiner, Henry Stephens Salt
- Publication: Seed-Time

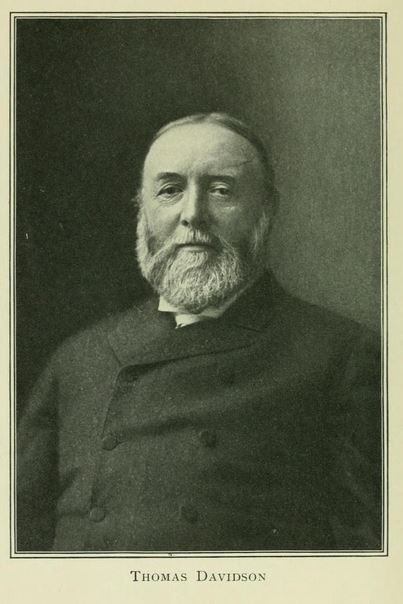
Thomas Davidson, founder of the Fellowship of New Life

The Fellowship of the New Life was a British organisation in the 19th century, most famous for a splinter group, the Fabian Society.

It was founded in 1883, by the Scottish intellectual Thomas Davidson. Fellowship members included the poet Edward Carpenter, animal rights activist Henry Stephens Salt, sexologist Havelock Ellis, feminist Edith Lees (who later married Ellis), novelist Olive Schreiner and future Fabian secretary Edward R. Pease. Future UK Prime Minister Ramsay MacDonald was briefly a member. According to MacDonald, the Fellowship's main influences were Henry David Thoreau and Ralph Waldo Emerson. The Fellowship published a journal called Seed-Time.

Its objective was "The cultivation of a perfect character in each and all." They wanted to transform society by setting an example of clean simplified living for others to follow. Many of the Fellowship's members advocated pacifism, vegetarianism and simple living, under the influence of Leo Tolstoy's ideas. But when some members also wanted to become politically involved to aid society's transformation, it was decided that a separate society, the Fabian Society, would also be set up. All members were free to attend both societies. The Fellowship of the New Life disbanded in 1898.

Although not a member, Patrick Geddes was influenced by some of the organisation's ideas.

== Origins ==
Thomas Davidson was heavily influenced by the writings of Italian philosopher and priest Antonio Rosmini-Serbati. Upon studying and translating Rosmini's writings, Davidson began to formulate the idea that would lead to the creation of the Fellowship, that pure intelligence would lead to a better and higher society.

Beginning in 1883, Davidson gave several public lectures, and slowly a small group of like-minded individuals began gathering with him for meetings at his home in Chelsea, London. Between 1881 and 1885, Thomas Davidson held small meetings with this group of intellectuals. These meetings were designed to incorporate people who held similar ideals as Davidson, and to form a small society promoting the reorganisation of individual life. This reorganisation would then lead to slow progress towards a higher overall form of human society. Davidson was much more interested in discussion and meetings about this goal than scientific study or speculation.

== Aims ==
=== Early intentions ===
Davidson was a major proponent of a structured philosophy about religion, ethics, and social reform. He was a man full of ideas and wanted these ideas to see the light of day through his new society. Maurice Adams, one of the first members of the Fellowship, wrote of Davidson " 'Intellectual Honesty' was his watchword, and what he had perhaps most at heart."

At a meeting on 16 November 1883, a summary of the society's goals was drawn up by Maurice Adams: "We, recognising the evils and wrongs that must beset men so long as our social life is based upon selfishness, rivalry, and ignorance, and desiring above all things to supplant it by a life based upon unselfishness, love, and wisdom, unite, for the purpose of realising the higher life among ourselves, and of inducing and enabling others to do the same. And we now form ourselves into a Society, to be called the Guild [Fellowship] of the New Life, to carry out this purpose."

=== Vita Nuova ===
The initial Fellowship was composed of about nine members, one of whom was Dr. Burns Gibson. He proposed a set of principles that took the form of a resolutions list. At one meeting of the Fellowship, the "Vita Nuova" was created and adopted by the group's members. This basic document formed the core set of beliefs held by the society. This is as the document appears in its original form, as seen in the Memorials of Thomas Davidson:

Vita Nuova

- Object. The cultivation of a perfect character in each and all.
- Principle. The subordination of material things to spiritual things.
- Fellowship. The sole and essential condition of fellowship shall be a single-minded, sincere, and strenuous devotion to the object and principle.
- Intercourse. It is intended in the first instance to hold frequent gatherings for intimate social intercourse, as a step towards the establishment of a community among the members.
- Designs. The promotion, by both practice and precept, of the following methods of contributing toward the attainment of the end : (i) The supplanting of the spirit of competition and self-seeking by that of unselfish regard for the general good; (2) simplicity of living; (3) the highest and completest education of the young; (4) the introduction, as far as possible, of manual labor in conjunction with intellectual pursuits; (5) the organisation, within and without the Fellowship, of meetings for religious communion, and of lectures, addresses, classes, and conferences for general culture, and for the furtherance of the aims of the Fellowship.

== Prominent members ==
=== Edward Carpenter ===
Edward Carpenter (1844–1929) was a founding member of the Fellowship of the New Life and was at the first meeting in 1883. He was also one of the founders of the Fabian Society, the Labour Party and one of the most well-known people of the century. He was an English poet, socialist philosopher, anthologist, and early gay rights activist. He was interested in the main ideas of the Fellowship, including politics, sexual radicalism and the works of Henry Havelock Ellis.

=== Henry Havelock Ellis ===
Havelock Ellis was present when the Fellowship of the New Life was founded in London in 1883. There is no record of his contributions to discussion, although his participation in the organisation increased after the formation of the Fabian Society.

=== Edith Ellis ===
Edith Ellis was the first woman served in secrete of the Fellowship of the New Life in 1887. She was a lecturer, writer, secretary and general factotum of Fellowship house, an experiment in communal living in which the ideals of the Fellowship of the new life were to be made manifest in Doughty Street. Before she joined, she was active in a number of cultural and political enterprises, but it was joining the Fellowship that earned her notability.

== The Fabian Society ==
The Fabian Society, established on 4 January 1884, was a branch of Thomas Davidson's Fellowship of the New Life. The Society was named after Fabius Cunctator, a suggestion by Frank Podmore, because of Fabius' successful policy of gradual change that the society favored. The first meeting included well-known people in the socialist cause, including J. Hunter Watts, Percival Chubb, Frank Podmore, Edward Pease, Hubert Bland, Dr. Burns-Gibson, and Frederick Keddell, and although the society was a branch of the Fellowship of the New Life, Thomas Davidson shared no sympathies with Fabianism.

The Fabian Society had a more socialist movement than the Fellowship; however, it still had the individual as their base and starting point. It was geared more towards the external ideal rather than an inward one. Edward Pease said that the purpose of Fabianism was to reconstruct society to secure general welfare and happiness. Unlike the Fellowship the Fabian Society was more political and public, and their political section was influenced by Karl Marx and the Social Democratic Federation (SDF). Havelock Ellis says about the society: "an attempt to be more practical, and definitely more socialistic."

The Fabian Society's basis was to promote the transfer of land and capital to the State, equality of citizenship of men and women, and having public authority instead of private for the education and support of children. The resolutions of the Society were written by Frederick Keddell, the first secretary of the Fabian Society.

== Impact ==
The Fellowship of the New Life was dissolved in 1898, but the Fabian Society grew to become a preeminent academic society in the United Kingdom. Another group organised the name of Fabian society by the center of the founder Sidney and Beatrice Webb. After that, many of Fabians participated in the formation of England's Labour Party in 1900. The party's constitution, written by Sidney Webb, borrowed heavily from the founding documents of the Fabian Society. As seen in the Labour Party Foundation Conference in 1900, the Fabian Society claimed 861 members and sent one delegate.

The Fabian society grew throughout 1930–1940 over many countries under the British rule, and many future leaders of these countries were influenced by the Fabians during their struggles for independence from the British. These leaders included India's prime minister Jawaharlal Nehru, Obafemi Awolowo, who later became the premier of Nigeria's defunct Western Region, and the founder of Pakistan, Barrister Muhammad Ali Jinnah. Lee Kuan Yew, the first prime minister of Singapore, had a political philosophy strongly influenced by the Fabian Society. Even in the 21st century, the Fabian Society's influence is felt through Labour Party leaders such as former prime ministers of Great Britain, Tony Blair and Gordon Brown.

== See also ==
- Tolstoyan movement
