= Thomas Davidson (philosopher) =

Scottish-American philosopher (1840–1900)

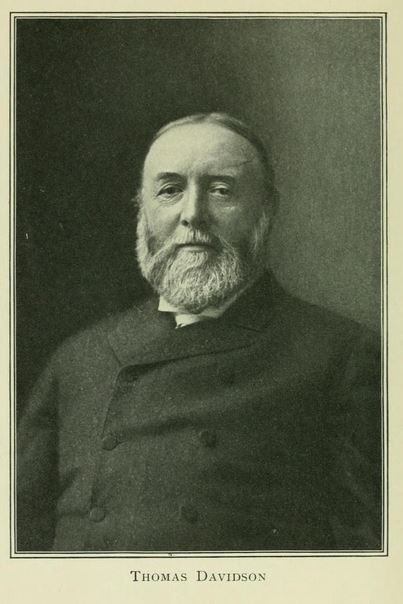
- Born: 25 October 1840; Old Deer, Aberdeenshire, Scotland
- Died: 14 September 1900 (aged 59); Montreal, Canada
- Education: University of Aberdeen

Thomas Davidson (25 October 1840 – 14 September 1900) was a Scottish-American philosopher and lecturer.

== Biography ==
Davidson was born of Presbyterian parents at Old Deer, near Aberdeen. After graduating from Aberdeen University (1860) as first graduate and Greek prizeman, he held the position of rector of the grammar school of Old Aberdeen (1860–1863). From 1863 until 1866, he was master in several English schools, spending his vacations on the continent. In 1866 he moved to Canada, to occupy a place in the London Collegiate Institute. In the following year, he came to the United States, and, after spending some months in Boston, moved to St. Louis, where, in addition to work on the New York Round Table and the Western Educational Monthly, he was classical master in the St. Louis high school, and subsequently principal of one of the branch high schools.

In 1875, he moved to Cambridge, Massachusetts. He traveled extensively, and became a proficient linguist, acquiring a knowledge of French, German, Italian, Spanish, Greek, Latin, and Arabic.

In Greece, he devoted himself mainly to archaeology and modern Greek. He wrote Fragments of Parmenides (1869). In Italy, he studied the Catholic Church, scholastic philosophy, Dante, and Rosmini. For studying the Catholic Church, unusual opportunities were thrown open to him, chiefly through the Princess Carolyne zu Sayn-Wittgenstein and Cardinal Hohenlohe, who offered him an apartment in his episcopal palace at Albano, and also in the Villa d'Este at Tivoli. His interest in Thomas Aquinas having come to the ears of the pope through Bishop (later Cardinal) Schiatlino, he was invited to the Vatican, where the pope suggested that he should settle in Rome and aid his professors in editing the new edition of St. Thomas. For more than a year he lived at Domodossola, in Piedmont, where the Institute of Charity, founded by Rosmini, has its novitiate. Here he produced the work that first brought Rosmini to the notice of English-speaking students: The Philosophical System of Antonio Rosmini-Serbati, translated, with a Sketch of the Author's Life, Bibliography, Introduction, and Notes (London, 1882). At the same time he wrote essays on classical subjects, mainly archaeological, published under the title The Parthenon Frieze and Other Essays (London, 1882). He also translated Rosmini's Psychology (3 vols., London, 1884). In 1883, he occupied a villa in Capri, and there translated Rosmini's Anthropology. Davidson was a frequent contributor to periodicals, and delivered courses of lectures, before the Lowell Institute in Boston and elsewhere, on modern Greece, on Greek sculpture, etc. He was mainly instrumental in founding "The Fellowship of the New Life," which had branches in London and New York.

Davidson's most successful work was in connection with the Educational Alliance in New York, where he attained wide popularity by a series of lectures on sociology. A special class was formed for Jewish young men and women, whom he introduced to the great writers on sociology and their problems. He aimed at founding among them what he called a "Breadwinners' College," but his work was cut short by his sudden death in Montreal, Quebec.

== Apeirotheism ==
Thomas Davidson taught a philosophy called apeirotheism that has been described as a "form of pluralistic idealism...coupled with a stern ethical rigorism..." Increasingly, he preferred to identify his philosophy as apeirotheism, an appellation he defined as "a theory of Gods infinite in number." The theory was indebted to Aristotle's pluralism and his concepts of the soul and Nous. Aristotle's "soul" is the rational, living aspect of a living substance and cannot exist apart from the body because it is not a substance, but rather an essence; Nous is rational thought and understanding. Davidson argued that Aristotle's Nous identified God with rational thought, and that God could not exist apart from the world just as the Aristotelian soul could not exist apart from the body. Thus Davidson grounded an immanent Emersonian World Soul in a sophisticated Aristotelian metaphysics.

Though initially a panentheist, Davidson's studies in Domodossola—including the work of the Italian Renaissance philosopher Giordano Bruno, Leibniz, Kant, and Rosmini—led him to a panpsychistic monadology, a theory that reality consists of an infinite number of mental or spiritual substances, each with an Aristotelian telos. Human psyches are unique however, because they possess autonomy, which provides the potential to become divine through proper, moral association with other human psyches. This allowed Davidson to reject pantheism, which, he reasoned, led to a God "scattered through the universe...so that the total Absolute exists only in the sum of things taken together." Rather, Davidson argued, God exists everywhere, but he "exists fully or completely" in each monad. Reality is a Göttergemeinschaft, a society of gods; metaphysical, social and spiritual unity is moral rather than ontological.

Davidson's religious philosophy had important consequences for social thought. Apeirotheism was utterly democratic and perfectionistic because it entailed that each individual has the potential to be a God, although restrictive social relations have thwarted the development of most people's potential. For Davidson, because we contain the divine within us, our unfettered natural instincts would impel us to act morally. As individuals became increasingly aware of the divine within themselves, so they became increasingly moral. James believed this individualistic religion made Davidson "indifferent...to socialisms and general administrative panaceas." According to James, Davidson taught that "Life must be flexible. You ask for a free man and these Utopias give you an interchangeable part, with a fixed number, in a rule-bound social organism." Apeirotheism called for the release of each individual's potential divinity through self-cultivation and the nurturing of others rather than through changes in one's material conditions. Davidson was convinced that this release would lead to the only true reform of human society; it was to this task that he devoted the rest of his life.

== Publications ==
Some of his publications are (ref. LWBL):

- Davidson, Thomas. A Short Account of the Niobe Group, 1874;
- Davidson, Thomas (ed.). The Philosophical System of Antonio Rosmini-Serbati. London: Kegan Paul, 1882.
- Davidson, Thomas. The Parthenon Frieze, and Other Essays. London: Kegan Paul, 1882.
- Davidson, Thomas. The Place of Art in Education, 1886;
- Davidson, Thomas. Hand-Book to Dante, from the Italian of Scartazzini, with Notes and Additions, 1887;
- Davidson, Thomas. Prolegomena to Tennyson's In Memoriam, 1889;
- Davidson, Thomas. Aristotle and Ancient Educational Ideals. New York: Scribner, 1892 (repr. 1905).
- Davidson, Thomas. The Education of the Greek People and Its Influence on Civilization. New York: Appleton, 1894 (repr. 1906).
- Davidson, Thomas. Rousseau and Education According to Nature. New York: Scribner, 1898.
- Davidson, Thomas. A History of Education. Westminster: Archibald Constable & Co., 1900.
- Davidson, Thomas The Education of the Wage-Earners: A Contribution Toward the Solution of the Educational Problem of Democracy. Boston: The Athenaeum Press, Ginn & Co., 1904.
- Davidson, Thomas, with Charles Montague Bakewell as editor. The Philosophy of Goethe's Faust Boston: Ginn, 1906.
