= Boundary problem (political science) =

In the field of political science, the boundary problem is the problem of determining the legitimate boundaries of polities or self-governing communities. Boundaries are here understood not only in the geographical sense but also in the social sense of distinguishing members of the community from non-members. Alternatively, it can be considered as the problem of reconciling the democratic rights of individuals with the collective right of self-determination – the problem of balancing an individual's right to democratic inclusion with a community's right to exclude individuals in determining its own constitution.

== History of the term ==
The term "boundary problem" was introduced by the American political scientist Frederick G. Whelan in 1983. Whelan noted that the concept of democracy "always makes reference to a determinate community of persons (...) who are collectively self-governing", yet the drawing of the boundaries of such communities "is a significant problem for democratic theory and practice" and "democratic theory itself offers no clear guidance on the matter." Previously, in 1956, the British lawyer Sir Ivor Jennings had put the essence of the boundary problem in pithy terms: "The people cannot decide until someone decides who are the people."

Historically, Aristotle in Book III of his Politics considered questions of citizenship and non-citizenship as well as the boundaries and identities of political communities. Immanuel Kant in his work Perpetual Peace argued that sovereign states owe certain rights of "world citizenship" ("Weltbürgerrecht") to aliens within their jurisdiction.

== Examples ==
As a theoretical problem, the boundary problem lies in the fact that there are no universally recognized principles according to which the boundaries of democratically self-governing polities could be set. Also, actually existing democratic communities are for the most part historically constituted undemocratically. Their boundaries may have been established by historical accident, by acts of autocracy, or war, or imperial bureaucracy; what, then, makes them legitimate instead of some other possible constellation of democratic communities comprising the same individuals?

As a practical matter, the boundary problem arises in territorial disputes between sovereign states as well as in demands for independent statehood; it also arises within sovereign states for example in disputes involving the rights of ethnic minorities, indigenous peoples, and regional sub-units of states, or member states of federally constituted states.

A typical example of the boundary problem is a case in which two sovereign states lay claim to the same territory, or a part of a sovereign state demands to secede. Frequently, a referendum is proposed as a peaceful and democratic way of resolving a sovereignty dispute, but the question then becomes one of deciding who is eligible to vote and who is not, that is, where the boundaries of the proposed community are to be drawn for the purpose of democratic self-determination, a question complicated by the fact that in most geographical territories, ethnic, religious, and other groups co-exist and overlap in varying proportions.

Another case of the boundary problem is a conflict between the claim of an ethnic group, such as an indigenous people, to limit participation to those with a shared ethnic heritage and to exclude colonialist settlers or historical occupiers or their heirs, and the claims of individuals of the latter groups to be included in the democratic process of their homeland.
