= Self-determination =

Right to participate in one's own governance

In international law, self-determination refers to a people's right to form its own political entity. Self-determination is a cardinal principle in modern international law, binding, as such, on the United Nations as an authoritative interpretation of the Charter's norms. The principle does not state how the decision is to be made, nor what the outcome should be (whether independence, federation, protection, some form of autonomy or full assimilation) Further, no right to secession is recognized under international law.

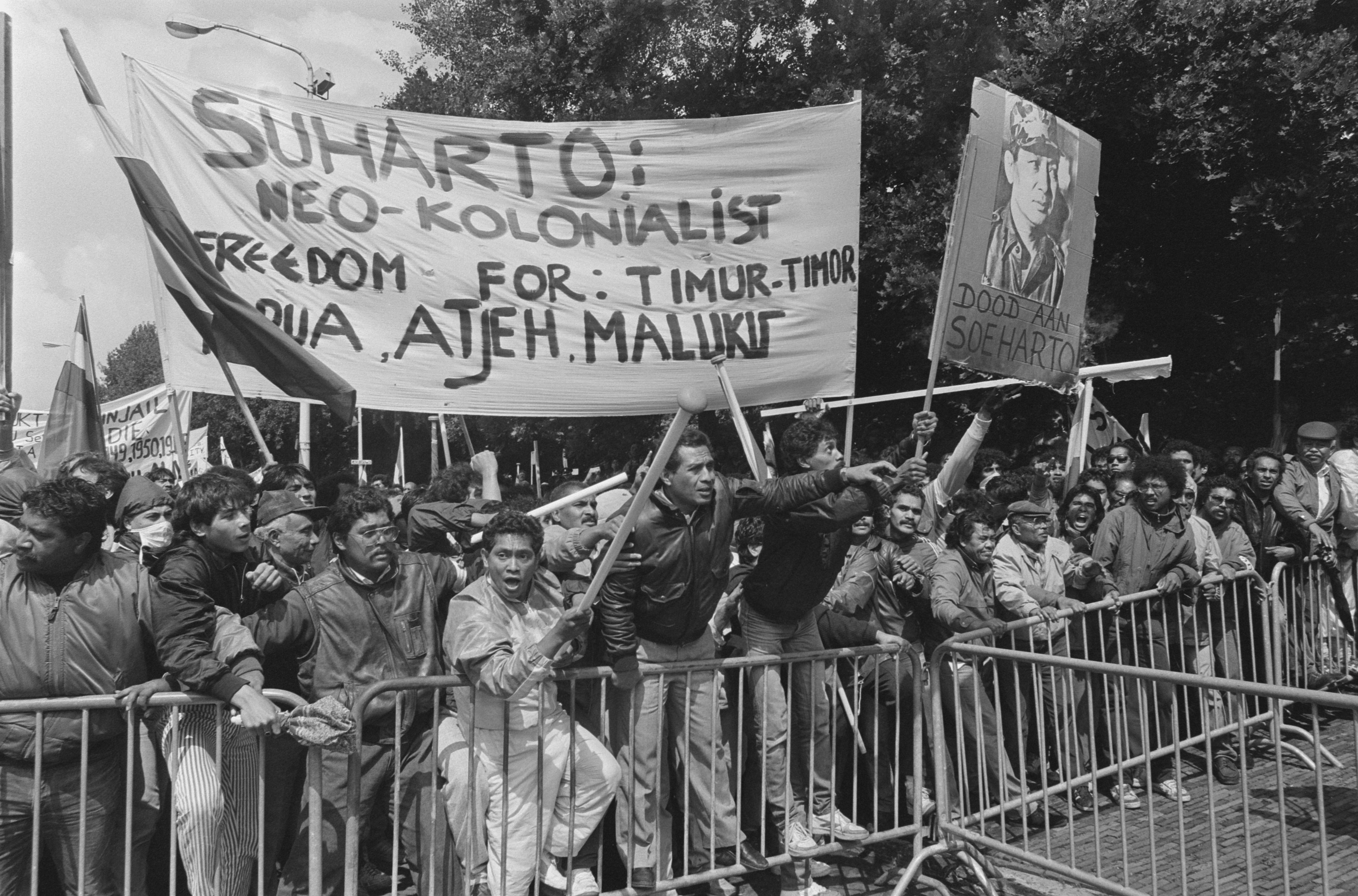
Moluccans in The Hague protesting Indonesia under Suharto's treatment of East Timor, calling for freedom for East Timor, Papua, Aceh and Maluku, 1986

The concept emerged with the rise of nationalism in the 19th century and came into prominent use in the 1860s, spreading rapidly thereafter. During and after World War I, a general principle of self-determination was proclaimed by United States President Woodrow Wilson and others. Having announced his Fourteen Points on 8 January 1918, Wilson stated on 11 February 1918: "National aspirations must be respected; people may now be dominated and governed only by their own consent. 'Self determination' is not a mere phrase; it is an imperative principle of action." However, neither Wilson and Lloyd George nor Lenin and Trotsky considered the peoples of the Global South as the main target for their statements supporting self-determination. Nevertheless, their rhetoric resonated far beyond the European audiences they aimed to reach. During World War II, the principle was included in the Atlantic Charter, jointly declared on 14 August 1941 by Franklin D. Roosevelt, President of the United States, and Winston Churchill, Prime Minister of the United Kingdom, who pledged The Eight Principal points of the Charter. It was recognized as an international legal right after it was explicitly listed as a right in the UN Charter.

Implementing the right to self-determination can be politically difficult, in part because there are multiple interpretations of what constitutes a people and which groups may legitimately claim the right to self-determination. As World Court judge Ivor Jennings put it: "the people cannot decide until somebody decides who are the people".

== History ==
=== Pre-20th century ===
The norm of self-determination can be traced to the American and French revolutions, and the emergence of nationalism. The European revolutions of 1848, the post–World War I settlement at Versailles, and the decolonization movement after World War II shaped and established the norm in international law. The American example has been seen as the earliest assertion of the right of national self-determination, although this was argued primarily in terms of resistance to a despotic ruler rather than appeals to a "natural right" of peoples to determine their political fate, the latter emerging with the independence of Spanish colonies in Latin America.

These concepts were inspired particularly by earlier ideas from Hugo Grotius and Immanuel Kant, and by the mid-nineteenth century, "self-determination" had evolved into a weapon for revolutionary nationalism. Thomas Jefferson further promoted the notion that the will of the people was supreme, especially through authorship of the United States Declaration of Independence, which became an inspiration for European nationalist movements during the 19th century. The French Revolution legitimized the ideas of self-determination on that Old World continent.

Nationalist sentiments emerged inside traditional empires: Pan-Slavism in Russia; Ottomanism, Kemalist ideology and Arab nationalism in the Ottoman Empire; State Shintoism and Japanese identity in Japan; and Han identity in juxtaposition to the Manchurian ruling class in China. Meanwhile, in Europe itself, the rise of nationalism led to Italy, Greece, Hungary, Poland and Bulgaria all seeking or winning independence.

Karl Marx and Friedrich Engels supported some of these nationalist movements, believing nationalism might be a "prior condition" to social reform and international alliances. In 1914, Vladimir Lenin wrote: "[It] would be wrong to interpret the right to self-determination as meaning anything but the right to existence as a separate state."

In contrast, Rosa Luxemburg called a "right of nations to self-determination", valid for all countries and all times, "nothing more than a metaphysical cliché" that offers no "practical solution of nationality problems" and argued that the very concept of the nation as an "homogenous social and political entity" was derived from bourgeois ideology.

=== World Wars I and II ===
==== Europe, Asia and Africa ====
Map of territorial changes in Europe after World War I (as of 1923)

Map of the world in 1945, showing United Nations Trusteeship Council territories in green

Woodrow Wilson revived America's commitment to self-determination, at least for European states, during World War I. When the Bolsheviks came to power in Russia in the October Revolution, they called for Russia's immediate withdrawal as a member of the Allies of World War I. Lenin had used "national self-determination" as a weapon against the Russian Empire, and after the Revolution the party supported the right of all nations, including colonies, to self-determination. The 1918 Constitution of the Soviet Union acknowledged the right of secession for its constituent republics.

In January 1918, Wilson issued his Fourteen Points of January 1918 which, among other things, called for adjustment of colonial claims, insofar as the interests of colonial powers had equal weight with the claims of subject peoples. The Treaty of Brest-Litovsk in March 1918 led to Soviet Russia's exit from the war and the nominal independence of Armenia, Azerbaijan, Belarus, Estonia, Finland, Georgia, Latvia, Lithuania, Poland and Ukraine, though in fact those territories were under German control. The end of the war led to the dissolution of the defeated Austro-Hungarian Empire and Czechoslovakia and the union of the State of Slovenes, Croats and Serbs with the Kingdom of Serbia emerging as new states out of the wreckage of the Habsburg empire, along with the unification of all Romanian-speaking lands. However, this imposition of states where some nationalities (especially Poles, Czechs, Serbs and Romanians) were given power over other nationalities who disliked and distrusted them was eventually used as a pretext for German aggression in World War II.

The League of Nations was established as the symbol of the emerging postwar order. One of its earliest tasks was to legitimize the territorial boundaries of the new nation-states created in the territories of the former Ottoman Empire, Asia, and Africa. The League was not consistent in how it applied the principle in the postwar peace treaties and, in many places, had to compensate with highly complex arrangements to ensure protection of minorities. Nor did the principle of self-determination extend so far as to end colonialism, under the reasoning that the local populations were not civilized enough; the League of Nations was to assign each of the post-Ottoman, Asian and African states and colonies to a European power by the grant of a League of Nations mandate.

One of the German objections to the Treaty of Versailles was a somewhat selective application of the principle of self-determination, as the Republic of German-Austria, which included the Sudetenland, was seen as representing the will to join Germany in those regions, while the majority of people in Danzig wanted to remain within the Reich. However, the Allies ignored the German objections. Wilson's 14 Points had called for Polish independence to be restored and Poland to have "secure access to the sea", which would imply that the German city of Danzig (modern Gdańsk, Poland) be ceded to Poland. At the Paris Peace Conference in 1919, the Polish delegation asked Wilson to honor point 14 of the 14 points by transferring Danzig to Poland, arguing that the city was Polish until 1793, and that Poland would not be economically viable without it. During the First Partition of Poland in 1772, the inhabitants of Danzig fought fiercely for it to remain a part of Poland, but as a result of the Germanisation process in the 19th century, 90% of its inhabitants were German by 1919, which led to the creation of the Free City of Danzig, a city-state in which Poland had certain special rights. Though the city of Danzig was 90% German and 10% Polish, the surrounding countryside around Danzig was overwhelmingly Polish, and the ethnically Polish rural areas included in the Free City of Danzig objected, arguing that they wanted to be part of Poland. Neither the Poles nor the Germans were happy with this compromise, and the Danzig issue became a flash point of German-Polish tension throughout the interwar period.

During the 1920s and 1930s, there were some successful movements for self-determination in the beginnings of the process of decolonization. The Statute of Westminster granted independence to Canada, New Zealand, Newfoundland, Australia, and the Union of South Africa after the British parliament declared itself incapable of passing laws over them without their consent. This statute built on the Balfour Declaration of 1926 which recognized the autonomy of these British dominions, representing the first phase of the creation of the British Commonwealth of Nations. Egypt, Afghanistan, and Iraq also achieved independence from Britain. Other efforts were unsuccessful, like the Indian independence movement. Meanwhile, Italy, Japan and Germany all initiated new efforts to bring certain territories under their control. In particular, the National Socialist Program invoked this right of nations, as it was publicly proclaimed on 24 February 1920 by Adolf Hitler.

In Asia, Japan became a rising power and gained more respect from Western powers after its victory in the Russo-Japanese War. Japan joined the Allied Powers in World War I and attacked German colonial possessions in the Far East, adding former German possessions to its own empire. In the 1930s, Japan gained significant influence in Inner Mongolia and Manchuria after it invaded Manchuria. It established Manchukuo, a puppet state in Manchuria and eastern Inner Mongolia. This was essentially the model that Japan followed as it invaded other areas in Asia and established the Greater East Asia Co-Prosperity Sphere. Japan went to considerable trouble to argue that Manchukuo was justified by the principle of self-determination, claiming that people of Manchuria wanted to break away from China and asked the Kwantung Army to intervene on their behalf. However, the Lytton commission, which had been appointed by the League of Nations to decide if Japan had committed aggression or not, stated that the majority of people in Manchuria who were Han Chinese who did not wish to leave China.

In 1912, the Republic of China officially succeeded the Qing Dynasty, while Outer Mongolia, Tibet and Tuva proclaimed their independence. Independence was not accepted by the government of China. By the Treaty of Kyakhta (1915), Outer Mongolia recognized China's sovereignty. However, the Soviet threat of seizing parts of Inner Mongolia induced China to recognize Outer Mongolia's independence, provided that a referendum was held. The referendum took place on October 20, 1945, with—according to official numbers—100% of the electorate voting for independence.

Many of East Asia's current disputes to sovereignty and self-determination stem from unresolved disputes from World War II. After its fall, the Empire of Japan renounced control over many of its former possessions including Korea, Sakhalin Island, and Taiwan. In none of these areas were the opinions of affected people consulted, or given significant priority. Korea was specifically granted independence, but the receiver of various other areas was not stated in the Treaty of San Francisco, giving Taiwan de facto independence, although its political status continues to be ambiguous.

=== The Cold War world ===
==== The UN Charter and resolutions ====
In 1941, Allies of World War II declared the Atlantic Charter and accepted the principle of self-determination. In January 1942, twenty-six states signed the Declaration by United Nations, which accepted those principles. The ratification of the United Nations Charter in 1945 at the end of World War II placed the right of self-determination into the framework of international law and diplomacy.

- Chapter 1, Article 1, part 2 states that purpose of the UN Charter is "To develop friendly relations among nations based on respect for the principle of equal rights and self-determination of peoples, and to take other appropriate measures to strengthen universal peace."
- Article 1 in both the International Covenant on Civil and Political Rights (ICCPR) and the International Covenant on Economic, Social and Cultural Rights (ICESCR) reads: "All peoples have the right of self-determination. By virtue of that right they freely determine their political status and freely pursue their economic, social and cultural development."
- The United Nations Universal Declaration of Human Rights Article 15 states that everyone has the right to a nationality and that no one should be arbitrarily deprived of a nationality or denied the right to change nationality.

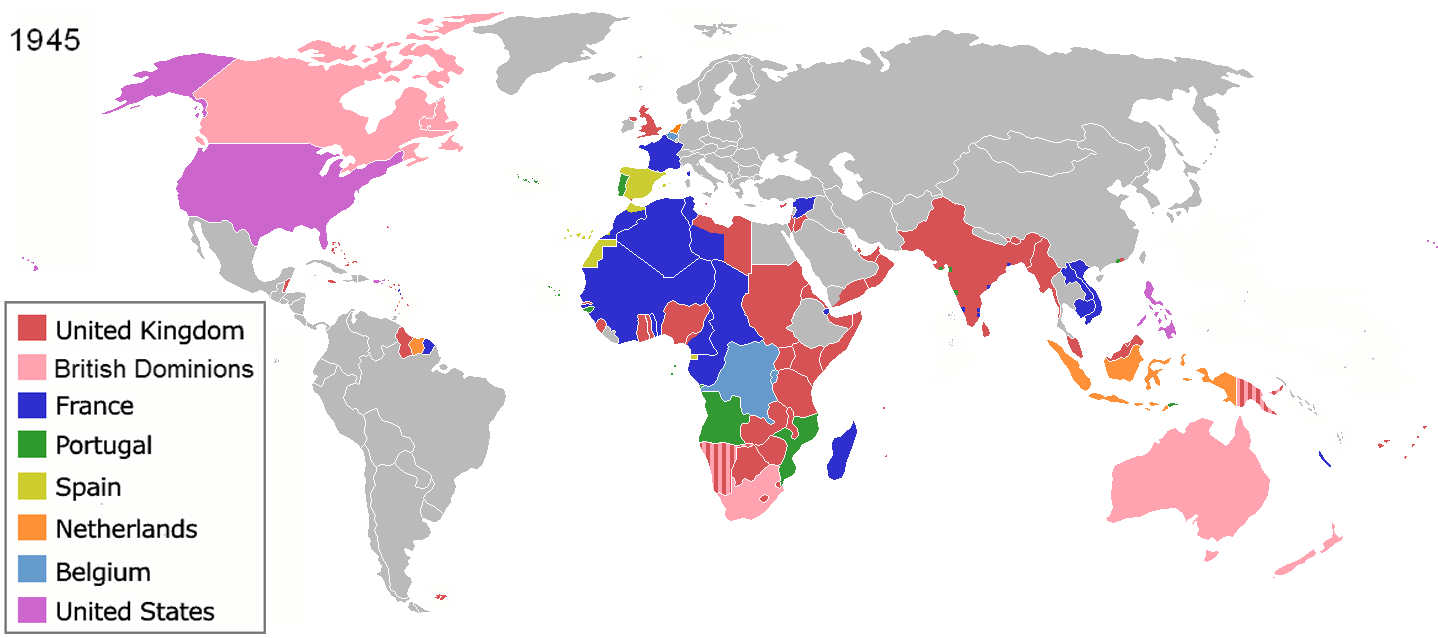
Western European colonial empires in Asia and Africa disintegrated after World War II

On 14 December 1960, the United Nations General Assembly adopted United Nations General Assembly Resolution 1514 (XV) subtitled "Declaration on the Granting of Independence to Colonial Countries and Peoples", which supported the granting of independence to colonial countries and people by providing an inevitable legal linkage between self-determination and its goal of decolonisation. It postulated a new international law-based right of freedom to exercise economic self-determination. Article 5 states: Immediate steps shall be taken in Trust and Non-Self-Governing Territories, or all other territories which have not yet attained independence, to transfer all powers to the people of those territories, without any conditions or reservations, in accordance with their freely expressed will and desire, without any distinction as to race, creed or colour, in order to enable them to enjoy complete independence and freedom.

On 15 December 1960, the United Nations General Assembly adopted United Nations General Assembly Resolution 1541 (XV), subtitled "Principles which should guide members in determining whether or nor an obligation exists to transmit the information called for under Article 73e of the United Nations Charter in Article 3", which provided that "[t]he inadequacy of political, economic, social and educational preparedness should never serve as a pretext for delaying the right to self-determination and independence." To monitor the implementation of Resolution 1514, the General Assembly created the Special Committee in 1961, referred to popularly as the Special Committee on Decolonization to ensure decolonization complete compliance with the principles of self-determination in General Assembly Resolution 1541 (XV).

However, the charter and other resolutions did not insist on full independence as the best way of obtaining self-government, nor did they include an enforcement mechanism. Moreover, new states were recognized by the legal doctrine of uti possidetis juris, meaning that old administrative boundaries would become international boundaries upon independence even if they had little relevance to linguistic, ethnic, and cultural boundaries. Nevertheless, justified by the language of self-determination, between 1946 and 1960, thirty-seven new nations in Asia, Africa, and the Middle East gained independence from colonial powers. The territoriality issue inevitably would lead to more conflicts and independence movements within many states and challenges to the assumption that territorial integrity is as important as self-determination.

==== The communist versus capitalist worlds ====
Decolonization in the world was contrasted by the Soviet Union's successful postwar expansionism. Tuva and several regional states in Eastern Europe, the Baltic, and Central Asia had been fully annexed by the Soviet Union during World War II. Now it extended its influence by establishing the satellite states of Eastern Germany and the countries of Eastern Europe, along with support for revolutionary movements in China and North Korea. Although satellite states were independent and possessed sovereignty, the Soviet Union violated principles of self-determination by suppressing the Hungarian revolution of 1956 and the Prague Spring Czechoslovak reforms of 1968. It invaded Afghanistan to support a communist government assailed by local tribal groups. However, Marxism–Leninism and its theory of imperialism were also strong influences in the national emancipation movements of Third World nations rebelling against colonial or puppet regimes. In many Third World countries, communism became an ideology that united groups to oppose imperialism or colonization.

Soviet actions were contained by the United States, which saw communism as a menace to its interests. Throughout the cold war, the United States created, supported, and sponsored regimes with various success that served their economic and political interests, among them anti-communist regimes such as that of Augusto Pinochet in Chile and Suharto in Indonesia. To achieve this, a variety of means was implemented, including the orchestration of coups, sponsoring of anti-communist countries and military interventions. Consequently, many self-determination movements, which spurned some type of anti-communist government, were accused of being Soviet-inspired or -controlled.

==== Asia ====
In Asia, the Soviet Union had already converted Mongolia into a satellite state but abandoned propping up the Second East Turkestan Republic and gave up its Manchurian claims to China. The new People's Republic of China had gained control of mainland China in the Chinese Civil War, later taking over independent Tibet. The Korean War shifted the focus of the Cold War from Europe to Asia, where competing superpowers took advantage of decolonization to spread their influence.

In 1947, India gained independence from the British Empire. The empire was in decline but adapted to these circumstances by creating the British Commonwealth—since 1949, the Commonwealth of Nations—which is a free association of equal states. As India obtained its independence, multiple ethnic conflicts emerged in relation to the formation of a statehood during the Partition of India, which resulted in Islamic Pakistan and Secular India. Before the advent of the British, no empire based in mainland India had controlled any part of what now makes up the country's Northeast, part of the reason for the ongoing insurgency in Northeast India. In 1971, Bangladesh obtained independence from Pakistan.

Burma (later Myanmar) also gained independence from the British Empire, but declined membership in the Commonwealth. In contrast, Ceylon (later Sri Lanka) and Malaya both joined the Commonwealth upon gaining independence from Britain, as well as the latter's successor states (Malaysia, Singapore, and Brunei).

Indonesia gained independence from the Dutch Empire in 1949 after the latter failed to restore colonial control. Indonesia also wanted a powerful position in the region that could be lessened by the creation of united Malaysia. The Netherlands retained its New Guinea part from the previous Dutch East Indies, but Indonesia threatened to invade and annex it. A vote was supposedly taken under the UN sponsored Act of Free Choice to allow West New Guineans to decide their fate, although many dispute its veracity. Later, Portugal relinquished control over East Timor in the aftermath of Carnation Revolution in 1975, at which time Indonesia promptly invaded and annexed it. In 1999, Indonesian president B. J. Habibie was pressured by Australia and the United Nations to give East Timor independence. The people of former Indonesian East Timor were given a choice of either greater autonomy within Indonesia or independence. 78.5% of East Timorese voted for independence, rejecting Indonesia's special autonomy proposal.

Laos and Cambodia both gained independence from the French Empire in 1953, although Vietnam's case was more complex than those of the other two former colonies of French Indochina. Despite Vietnam under the communist Viet Minh declaring independence from France in 1945, it had to fight the Southern Resistance War and later the First Indochina War against not just the French but also the anti-communist Western-backed State of Vietnam after 1949. This would last until the decisive Battle of Dien Bien Phu guaranteed the international recognition of Vietnam in 1954 at the Geneva Conference, albeit partitioned between the South Vietnam (State of Vietnam, later the Republic of Vietnam) as well as the communist North Vietnam (Democratic Republic of Vietnam). It wouldn't be until 1975 that Vietnam would be reunified under the north's rule following the Vietnam War.

=== After the Cold War ===
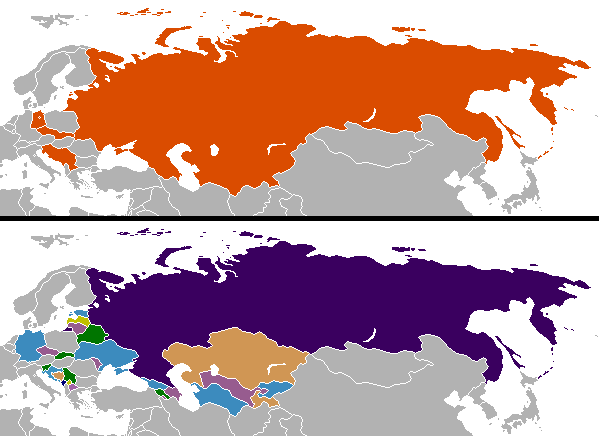
Changes in national boundaries after the end of the Cold War

The Cold War began to wind down after Mikhail Gorbachev assumed power as Soviet General Secretary in March 1985. With the cooperation of the U.S. President Ronald Reagan, Gorbachev wound down the size of the Soviet Armed Forces and reduced nuclear arms in Europe, while liberalizing the Soviet economy.

In the revolutions of 1989–90, the communist regimes of Soviet satellite states collapsed in rapid succession in Poland, Hungary, Czechoslovakia, East Germany, Bulgaria, Romania, and Mongolia. East and West Germany united, Czechoslovakia peacefully split into Czech Republic and Slovakia, while in the 1990s, Yugoslavia began a violent breakup into six states. North Macedonia and Montenegro became independent nations and broke off from Yugoslavia peacefully. Kosovo, which was previously an autonomous unit of Serbia, declared independence in 2008, but has received less international recognition.

In December 1991, Gorbachev resigned as president and the Soviet Union dissolved relatively peacefully into fifteen sovereign republics, all of which rejected Communism and most of which adopted democratic reforms and free-market economies. Inside those new republics, major areas have claimed their own independence, but not received widespread international recognition.

After decades of civil war, Indonesia finally recognized the independence of East Timor in 2002. Likewise, decades of civil war in Sudan finally led to South Sudan becoming independent in 2011.

In 1949, the Communist Party won the Chinese Civil War and established the People's Republic of China in Mainland China. The Kuomintang-led Republic of China government retreated to Taipei, its jurisdiction now limited to Taiwan and several outlying islands. Since then, the People's Republic of China has been involved in disputes with the ROC over issues of sovereignty and the political status of Taiwan.

As noted, self-determination movements remain strong in some areas of the world. Some areas possess de facto independence, such as Taiwan, North Cyprus, Kosovo, Abkhazia, and South Ossetia, but their independence is disputed by one or more major states. Significant movements for self-determination also persist for locations that lack de facto independence, such as East Turkistan ("Xinjiang"), Kurdistan, Balochistan, Chechnya, and Palestine.

== Current issues ==
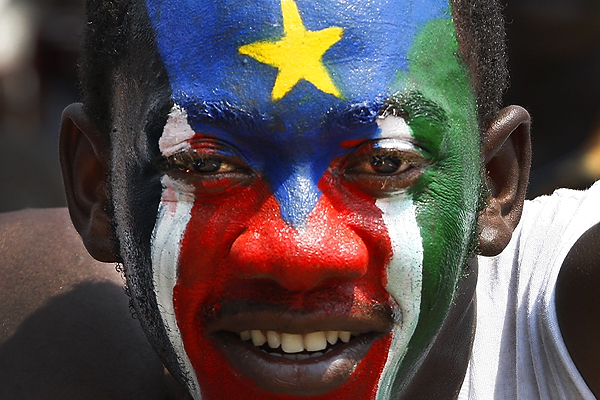
Southern Sudanese expressed joy and jubilation on their day of independence, July 9, 2011, from Sudan.

Since the early 1990s, the legitimatization of the principle of national self-determination has led to an increase in the number of conflicts within states, as subgroups seek greater self-determination and full secession, and as their conflicts for leadership within groups and with other groups and with the dominant state become violent. The international reaction to these new movements has been uneven and often dictated more by politics than principle. The 2000 United Nations Millennium Declaration failed to deal with these new demands, mentioning only "the right to self-determination of peoples which remain under colonial domination and foreign occupation."

In an issue of Macquarie University Law Journal, Associate Professor Aleksandar Pavkovic and Senior Lecturer Peter Radan outlined current legal and political issues in self-determination.

=== Defining "peoples" ===
There is not a recognized legal definition of "peoples" in international law. Indeed, Ivor Jennings called Wilson's doctrine "ridiculous" because, though on the surface it seems reasonable to "let the people decide", in practice "the people cannot decide until someone decides who are the people".

Reviewing various international judgements and UN resolutions, Vita Gudeleviciute of Vytautas Magnus University Law School finds that, in cases of non-self-governing peoples (colonized and/or indigenous) and foreign military occupation, "a people" is defined as the entire population of the occupied territorial unit, no matter their other differences. Meanwhile, in cases where people lack representation by a state's government, the unrepresented become a defined as a separate people. Present international law does not recognize ethnic and other minorities as separate peoples, with the notable exception of cases in which such groups are systematically disenfranchised by the government of the state in which they live.

Other definitions offered are "peoples" as self-evident (from ethnicity, language, history, etc.), or defined by "ties of mutual affection or sentiment" ("loyalty", or by mutual obligations among peoples).

Professor Uriel Abulof suggests that self-determination entails the "moral double helix" of duality: 1. personal right to align with a people, and the people's right to determine their politics; and 2. mutuality (the right is as much the other's as the self's). Thus, self-determination grants individuals the right to form "a people," which then has the right to establish an independent state, as long as they grant the same to all other individuals and peoples.

Self-determination has been argued to require the ability to legally treat "peoples" different from others, such as through discrimination based on citizenship.

=== Self-determination versus territorial integrity ===
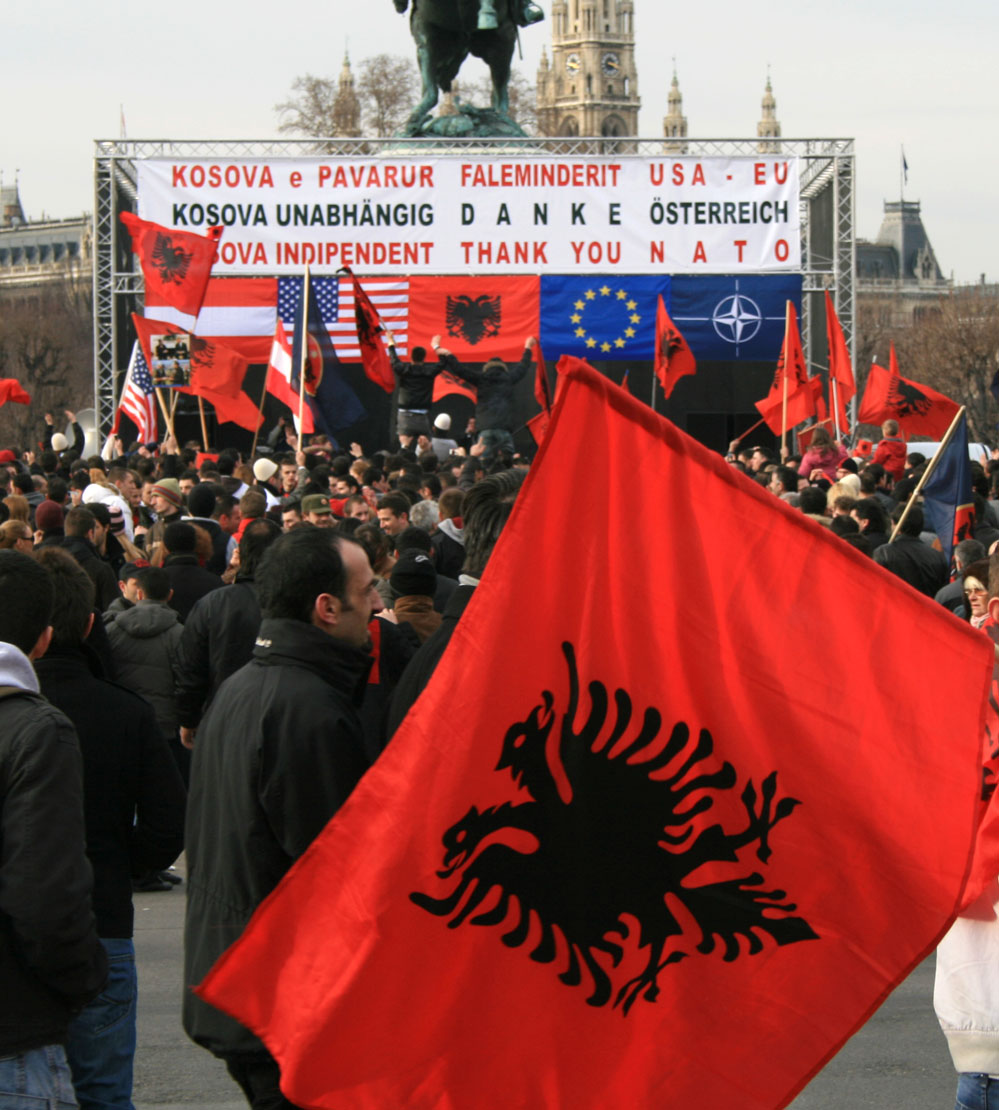
Celebration of the Declaration of Independence of Kosovo in 2008

National self-determination appears to challenge the principle of territorial integrity (or sovereignty) of states as it is the will of the people that makes a state legitimate. This implies that people should be free to choose their own state and its territorial boundaries. However, there are far more self-identified nations than there are existing states and there is no legal process to redraw state boundaries according to the will of these peoples. According to the Helsinki Final Act of 1975, the UN, ICJ and international law experts, there is no contradiction between the principles of self-determination and territorial integrity, with the latter taking precedence.

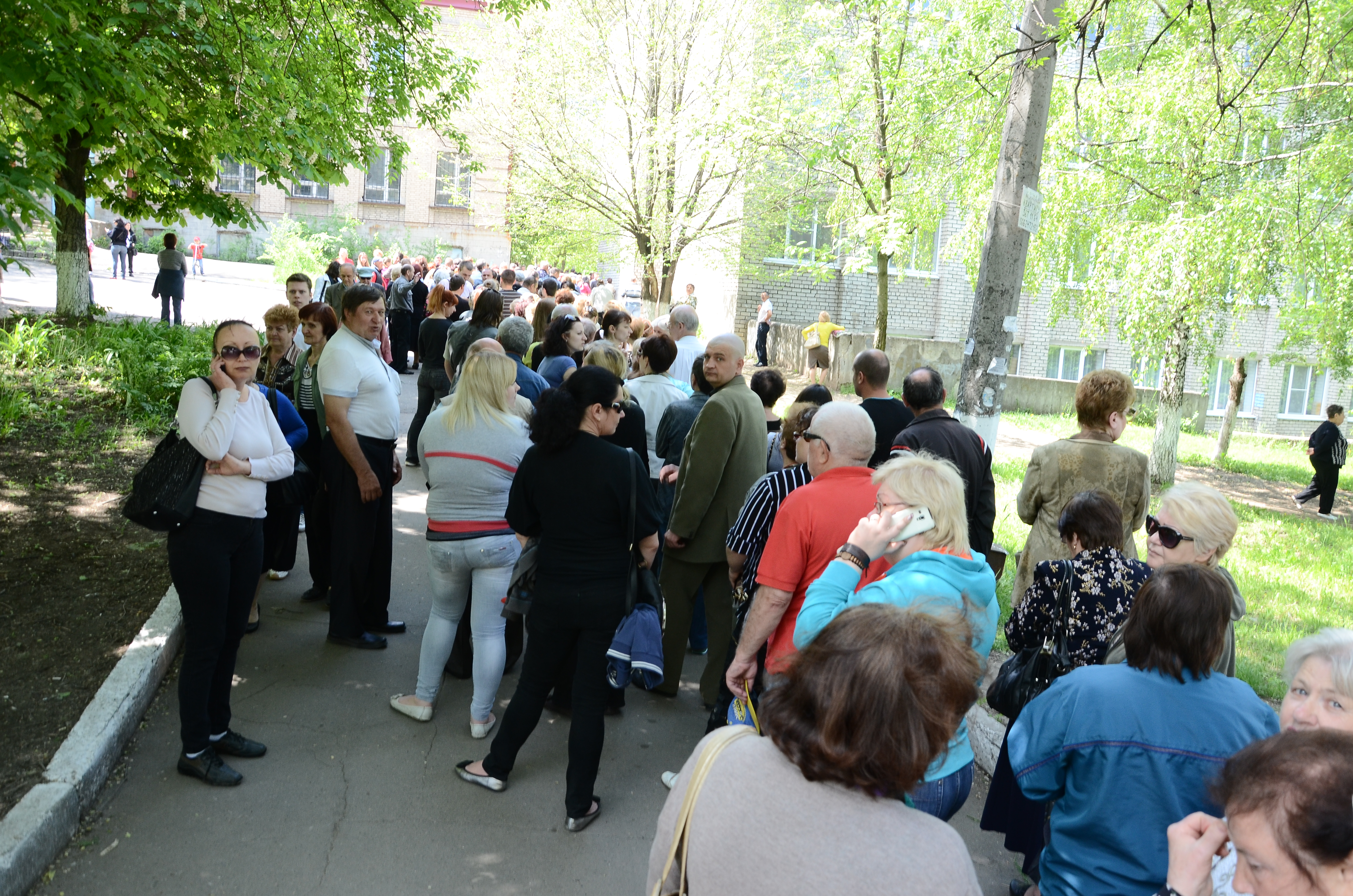
Donetsk status referendum organized by separatists in Ukraine. A line to enter a polling place, 11 May 2014

Allen Buchanan, author of seven books on self-determination and secession, supports territorial integrity as a moral and legal aspect of constitutional democracy. However, he also advances a "Remedial Rights Only Theory" where a group has "a general right to secede if and only if it has suffered certain injustices, for which secession is the appropriate remedy of last resort." He also would recognize secession if the state grants, or the constitution includes, a right to secede.

Vita Gudeleviciute holds that in cases of non-self-governing peoples and foreign military occupation the principle of self-determination trumps that of territorial integrity. In cases where people lack representation by a state's government, they also may be considered a separate people, but under current law cannot claim the right to self-determination. On the other hand, she finds that secession within a single state is a domestic matter not covered by international law. Thus, there is no consensus on what groups may constitute a seceding people.

A number of states have laid claim to territories, which they allege were removed from them as a result of colonialism. This is justified by reference to Paragraph 6 of UN Resolution 1514(XV), which states that any attempt "aimed at partial or total disruption of the national unity and the territorial integrity of a country is incompatible with the purposes and principles of the Charter". This, it is claimed, applies to situations where the territorial integrity of a state had been disrupted by colonisation, so that the people of a territory subject to a historic territorial claim are prevented from exercising a right to self-determination. This interpretation is rejected by many states, who argue that Paragraph 2 of UN Resolution 1514(XV) states that "all peoples have the right to self-determination" and Paragraph 6 cannot be used to justify territorial claims. The original purpose of Paragraph 6 was "to ensure that acts of self-determination occur within the established boundaries of colonies, rather than within sub-regions". Further, the use of the word attempt in Paragraph 6 denotes future action and cannot be construed to justify territorial redress for past action. An attempt sponsored by Spain and Argentina to qualify the right to self-determination in cases where there was a territorial dispute was rejected by the UN General Assembly, which reiterated that the right to self-determination was a universal right.

=== Methods of increasing minority rights ===
In order to accommodate demands for minority rights and avoid secession and the creation of a separate new state, many states decentralize or devolve greater decision-making power to new or existing subunits or autonomous areas.

=== Self-determination versus majority rule/equal rights ===
Self-determination can be at odds with the principle of majority rule and equal rights, especially when there is a sizable minority group. In democratic societies, majority rule is often used to determine the outcome in electoral and voting processes. However, a major critique of majority rule is that it may result in the tyranny of the majority, especially in cases in which a simple majority is used in order to determine outcome. This flaw is particularly poignant when there is a large minority group whose interests are not being represented, and who may then seek to secede.

The right to self-determination by a minority has long been contested in democracies with majority rule. For instance, in his first inaugural speech, Abraham Lincoln argued the following:

Plainly the central idea of secession is the essence of anarchy. A majority held in restraint by constitutional checks and limitations, and always changing easily with deliberate changes of popular opinions and sentiments, is the only true sovereign of a free people. Whoever rejects it does of necessity fly to anarchy or to despotism. Unanimity is impossible. The rule of a minority, as a permanent arrangement, is wholly inadmissible; so that, rejecting the majority principle, anarchy or despotism in some form is all that is left.

However, liberal proponents for the right to self-determination by minority groups contradict this notion by arguing that, in cases where the minority is not able to become the majority, and that minority is territorially concentrated and does not want to be governed by the majority, it may serve the best interest of the state to allow the secession of this group.

=== Constitutional law ===
Most sovereign states do not recognize the right to self-determination through secession in their constitutions. Many expressly forbid it. However, there are several existing models of self-determination through greater autonomy and through secession.

In liberal constitutional democracies, the principle of majority rule has dictated whether a minority can secede. In the United States, Abraham Lincoln acknowledged that secession might be possible through amending the United States Constitution. The Supreme Court in Texas v. White held secession could occur "through revolution, or through consent of the States." The British Parliament in 1933 held that Western Australia only could secede from Australia upon vote of a majority of the country as a whole; the previous two-thirds majority vote for secession via referendum in Western Australia was insufficient.

The Chinese Communist Party followed the Soviet Union in including the right of secession in its 1931 constitution in order to entice ethnic nationalities and Tibet into joining. However, the Party eliminated the right to secession in later years and had anti-secession clause written into the Constitution before and after the founding the People's Republic of China. The 1947 Constitution of the Union of Burma contained an express state right to secede from the union under a number of procedural conditions. It was eliminated in the 1974 constitution of the Socialist Republic of the Union of Burma (officially the "Union of Myanmar"). Burma still allows "local autonomy under central leadership".

As of 1996, the constitutions of Austria, Ethiopia, France, and Saint Kitts and Nevis have express or implied rights to secession. Switzerland allows for the secession from current and the creation of new cantons. In the case of proposed Quebec separation from Canada, the Supreme Court of Canada in 1998 ruled that only both a clear majority of the province and a constitutional amendment confirmed by all participants in the Canadian federation could allow secession.

The 2003 draft of the European Union Constitution allowed for the voluntary withdrawal of member states from the union, although the state which wanted to leave could not be involved in the vote deciding whether or not they can leave the Union. There was much discussion about such self-determination by minorities before the final document underwent the unsuccessful ratification process in 2005.

As a result of the successful constitutional referendum held in 2003, every municipality in the Principality of Liechtenstein has the right to secede from the Principality by a vote of a majority of the citizens residing in this municipality.

=== Drawing new borders ===
In determining international borders between sovereign states, self-determination has yielded to a number of other principles. Once groups exercise self-determination through secession, the issue of the proposed borders may prove more controversial than the fact of secession. The bloody Yugoslav Wars in the 1990s were related mostly to border issues because the international community applied a version of uti possidetis juris in transforming the existing internal borders of the various Yugoslav republics into international borders, despite the conflicts of ethnic groups within those boundaries. In the 1990s, indigenous populations of the northern two-thirds of Quebec province opposed being incorporated into a Quebec nation and stated a determination to resist it by force.

The border between Northern Ireland and the Irish Free State was based on the borders of existing counties and did not include all of historic Ulster (see Partition of Ireland). An Irish Boundary Commission was established to consider redrawing it. Its proposals, which amounted to a small net transfer to the Free State, were leaked to the press and then not acted upon. The Commission Report was suppressed and not published in full until 1969. In December 1925, the governments of the Irish Free State, Northern Ireland, and the United Kingdom agreed to accept the existing border.

== Notable cases ==
=== Artsakh ===
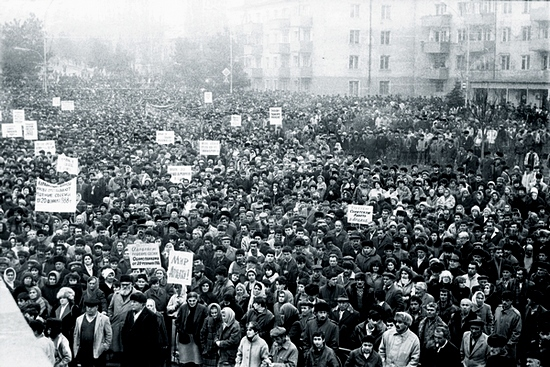
The first major demonstration in Stepanakert on February 13, 1988. Traditionally considered the start of the Artsakh movement.

Motivated by fears of cultural and physical erasure under government policies from Azerbaijan, Armenians launched a national liberation movement which came to be known as the Karabakh Movement between 1988 to 1991. The movement advocated for the reunification of the Nagorno-Karabakh Autonomous Oblast (NKAO) – an autonomous enclave within Azerbaijan – with Armenia.

The Republic of Artsakh (also known as the Nagorno-Karabakh Republic), in the Caucasus region, declared its independence in a 1991 referendum, which had an approval of 99% of voters; however, the breakaway state remained unrecognized by UN states and was disbanded on January 1, 2024, after Azerbaijan's military offensive and the expulsion of 99% of its population. The Armenian refugees from Nagorno-Karabakh have petitioned for the right of return. The government of Artsakh remains a government-in-exile. Samvel Shahramanyan, former and final president of Nagorno-Karabakh stated "our right to return to our birthplace, our homeland, is not up for denial." However, the state-sponsored anti-Armenian sentiment within Azerbaijan complicates the possible return of Azerbaijan's ethnic Armenian population.

=== Assyria ===
The Assyrian independence movement is a political movement and nationalist desire of the Assyrian people to live in their traditional Assyrian homeland under the self-governance of an Assyrian state. The Assyrian territory is currently in parts of Syria, Iraq, Iran, and Turkey.

=== Australia ===
Self-determination has become the topic of some debate in Australia in relation to Aboriginal Australians and Torres Strait Islanders. In the 1970s, Aboriginal Australians requested the right to administer their own remote communities as part of the homelands movement, also known as the outstation movement. These grew in number through the 1980s, but funding dried up in the 2000s.

=== Azawad ===
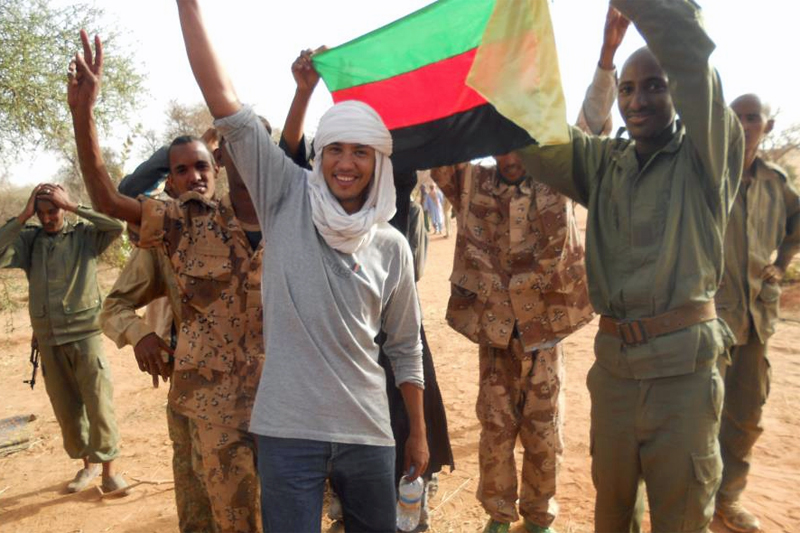
Tuareg rebels in the short-lived proto-state of Azawad in 2012

The traditional homeland of the Tuareg peoples was divided up by the modern borders of Mali, Algeria and Niger. Numerous rebellions occurred over the decades, but in 2012, the Tuaregs succeeded in occupying their land and declaring the independence of Azawad. However, their movement was hijacked by the Islamist terrorist group Ansar Dine.

=== Balochistan ===
The self-determination movement advanced by Baloch separatists is based on the argument that their incorporation into Pakistan in 1948 occurred without a genuine and inclusive popular mandate. At the time of partition of India, Balochistan consisted of British-administered territories and several princely states, the most prominent of which was the Khanate of Kalat. Following the withdrawal of British rule, Kalat declared independence in August 1947, asserting its historical sovereignty and treaty-based relationship with the British Crown. In March 1948, Kalat acceded to Pakistan, a decision that was contested by segments of the Baloch leadership, who argued that the accession was carried out under political and military pressure.

The insurgents have engaged in intermittent armed resistance against Pakistani rule from 1948 to the present. The conflict began shortly after the accession of the princely state of Kalat to Pakistan in March 1948, which was followed by the first Baloch rebellion led by Prince Abdul Karim. Since then, the region has witnessed several phases of insurgency—most notably in 1948, 1958–59, 1962–63, 1973–77, and from the early 2000s onwards, each driven by a combination of political-, economic-, and security-related grievances. Baloch separatists argue that they have been politically marginalized and subjected to systematic abuse by the Pakistani state.

Currently, the Balochistan Liberation Front and the Balochistan Liberation Army are among the leading groups associated with the movement, and are involved in both political activities and armed resistance against the Pakistani state for .

Balochistani nationalists also considers parts of Iran and Afghanistan as part of their independent state.

=== Basque Country ===
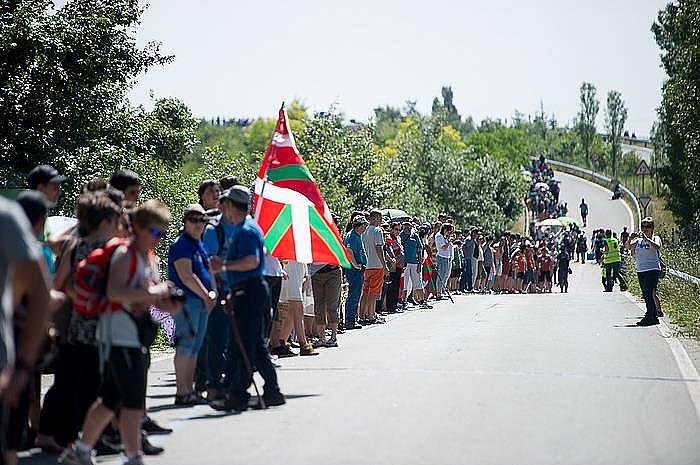
2014 human chain for Basque Country's right to decide

The Basque Country (Spanish: País Vasco, Basque: Euskadi, French: Pays Basque) as a cultural region (not to be confused with the homonym Autonomous Community of the Basque country) is a European region in the western Pyrenees that spans the border between France and Spain, on the Atlantic coast. It comprises the autonomous communities of the Basque Country and Navarre in Spain and the Northern Basque Country in France. Since the 19th century, Basque nationalism has demanded the right of some kind of self-determination. This desire for independence is particularly stressed among leftist Basque nationalists. The right of self-determination was asserted by the Basque Parliament in 1990, 2002 and 2006. Since self-determination is not recognized in the Spanish Constitution of 1978, some Basques abstained and some voted against it in the referendum of December 6 of that year. It was approved by a clear majority at the Spanish level, and with 74.6% of the votes in the Basque Country. However, the overall turnout in the Basque Country was 45% when the Spanish overall turnover was 67.9%. The derived autonomous regime for the BAC was approved by Spanish Parliament and also by the Basque citizens in referendum. The autonomous statute of Navarre (Amejoramiento del Fuero: "improvement of the charter") was approved by the Spanish Parliament and, like the statutes of 13 out of 17 Spanish autonomous communities, it did not need a referendum to enter into force.

Euskadi Ta Askatasuna or ETA (English: Basque Homeland and Freedom; pronounced [ˈeta]), was an armed Basque nationalist, separatist and terrorist organization that killed more than 800 people. Founded in 1959, it evolved from a group advocating traditional cultural ways to a paramilitary group with the goal of Basque independence. Its ideology was Marxist–Leninist.

=== Biafra ===
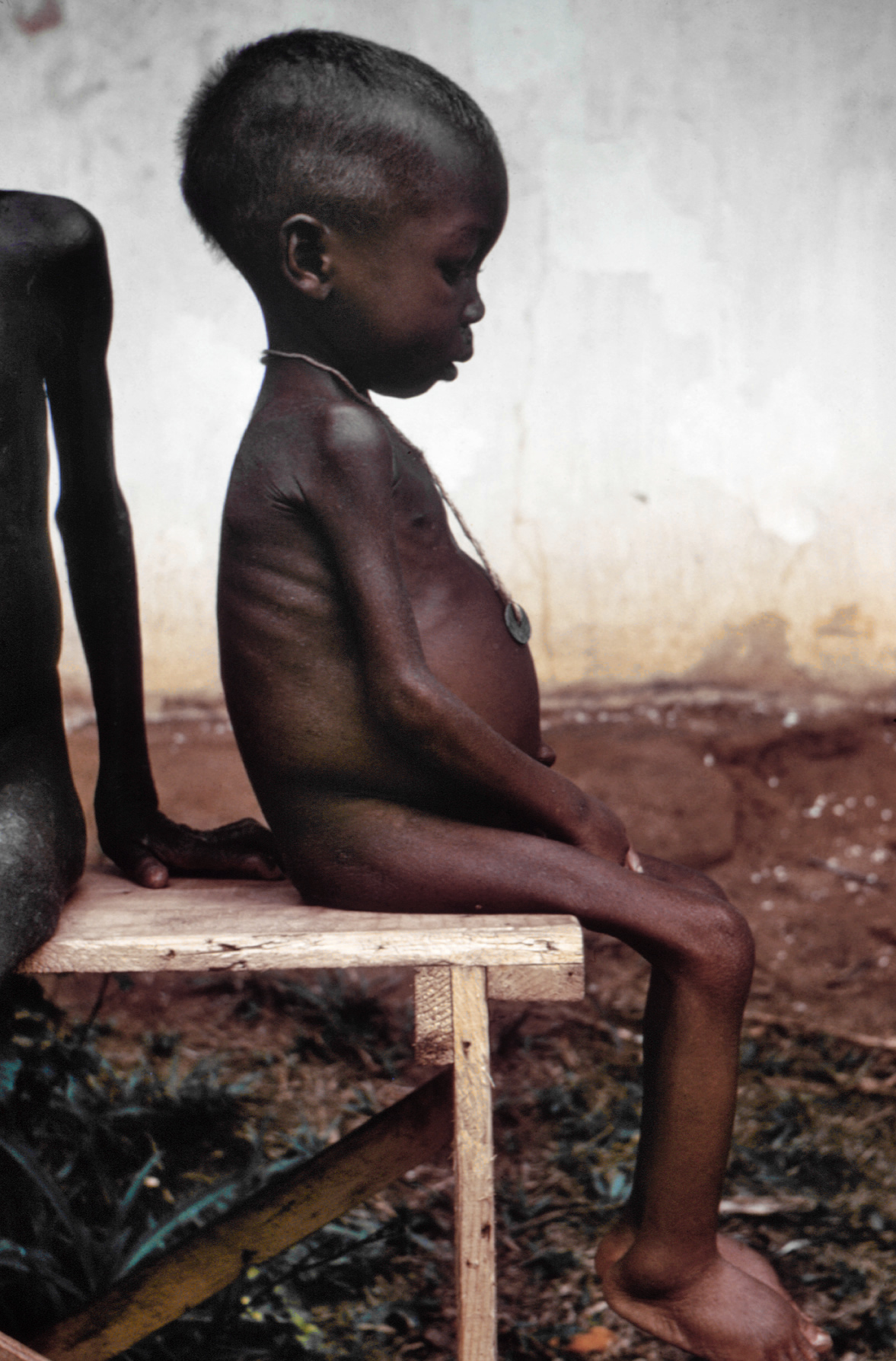
A girl during the Nigerian Civil War of the late 1960s. Pictures of the famine caused by Nigerian blockade garnered sympathy for the Biafrans worldwide.

The Nigerian Civil War was fought between Biafran secessionists of the Republic of Biafra and the Nigerian central government. From 1999 to the present day, the indigenous people of Biafra have been agitating for independence to revive their country. They have registered a human rights organization known as Bilie Human Rights Initiative both in Nigeria and in the United Nations to advocate for their right to self-determination and achieve independence by the rule of law.

=== Catalonia ===
After the 2012 Catalan march for independence, in which between 600,000 and 1.5 million citizens marched, the President of Catalonia, Artur Mas, called for new parliamentary elections on 25 November 2012 to elect a new parliament that would exercise the right of self-determination for Catalonia, a right not recognised under the Spanish Cortes Generales. The Parliament of Catalonia voted to hold a vote in the next four-year legislature on the question of self-determination. The parliamentary decision was approved by a large majority of MPs: 84 voted for, 21 voted against, and 25 abstained. The Catalan Parliament applied to the Spanish Parliament for the power to call a referendum to be devolved, but this was turned down. In December 2013, the President of the Generalitat Artur Mas and the governing coalition agreed to set the referendum for self-determination on 9 November 2014, and legislation specifically saying that the consultation would not be a "referendum" was enacted, only to be blocked by the Spanish Constitutional Court, at the request of the Spanish government. Given the block, the government turned it into a simple "consultation to the people" instead.

The question in the consultation was "Do you want Catalonia to be a state? If so, do you want Catalonia to become an independent state?". However, as the consultation was not a formal referendum, these (printed) answers were just suggestions and other answers were also accepted and catalogued as "other answers" instead as null votes. The turnout in this consultation was about 2.23 million people out of 5.4 million potential voters. Due to the lack of an official census, potential voters were assigned to electoral tables according to home address and first family name. Participants had to sign up first with their full name and national ID in a voter registry before casting their ballot, which prevented participants from potentially casting multiple ballots. The overall result was 80.76% in favor of both questions, 11% in favor of the first question but not of the second questions, 4.54% against both; and the rest were classified as "other answers". The voter turnout was around 37% (most people against the consultation did not go to vote). Four top members of Catalonia's political leadership were barred from public office for having defied the Constitutional court's last-minute ban.

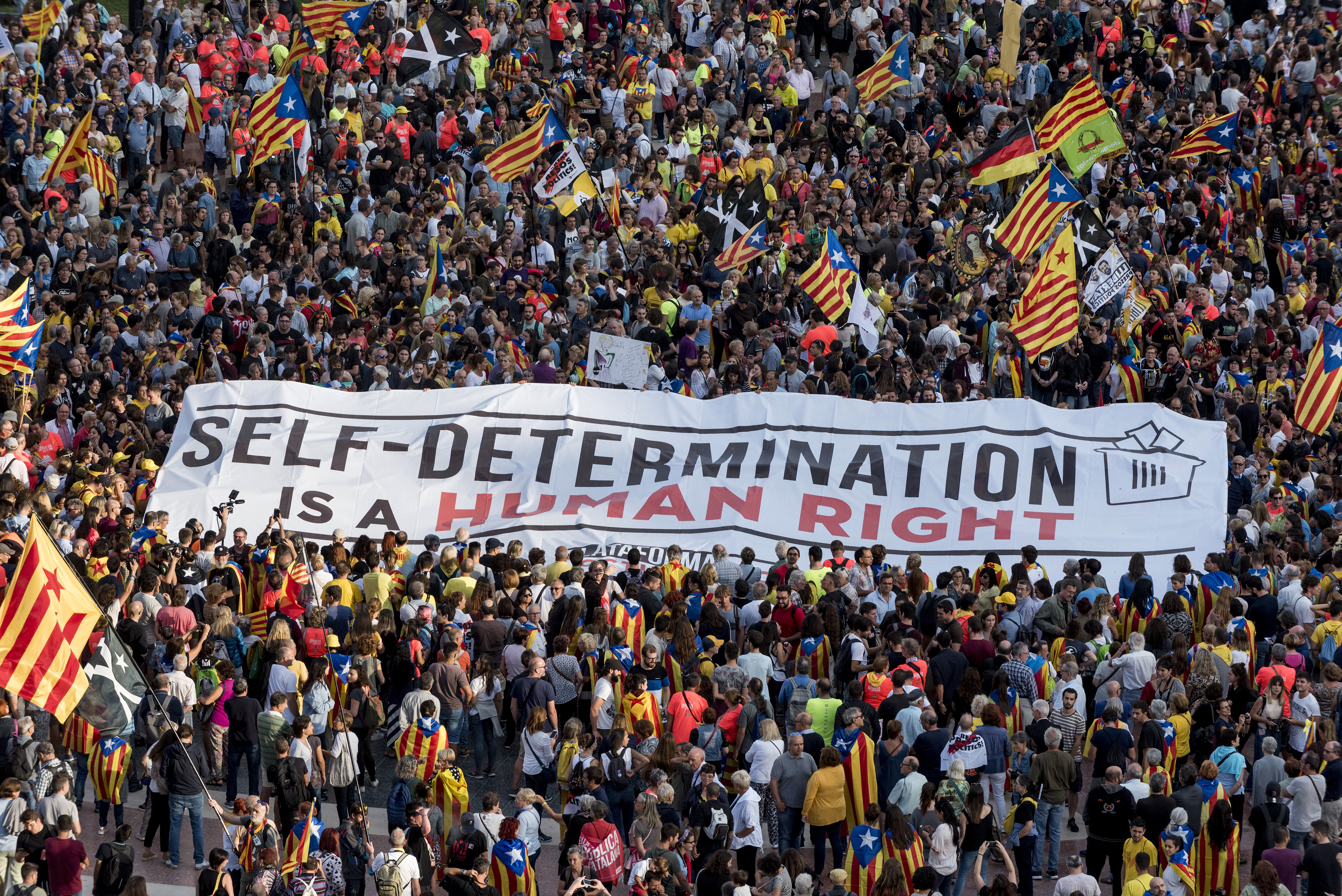
Protest in Barcelona on 1 October 2018

Almost three years later (1 October 2017), the Catalan government called a referendum for independence under legislation adopted in September 2017, despite this legislation had been suspended by the Constitutional Court for "violating fundamental rights of citizens", with the question "Do you want Catalonia to become an independent state in the form of a Republic?". On polling day, the Catalan regional police, which had been accused in the past of police brutality and impunity during the 15-M protests, prevented voting in over 500 polling stations without incidents. In some voting stations, the Catalan regional police did not intervene, while in other stations, they directly confronted the Spanish CNP (National Police Corps) to allow voters to participate. The CNP confiscated ballot boxes and closed down 92, voting centres with violent truncheon charges. The opposition parties had called for non-participation. The turnout (according to the votes that were counted) was 2.3m out of 5.3m (43.03% of the census), and 90.18% of the ballots were in favour of independence. The turnout, ballot count and results were similar to those of the 2014 "consultation".

=== Chechnya ===
Under Dzhokhar Dudayev, Chechnya declared independence as the Chechen Republic of Ichkeria, using self-determination, Russia's history of bad treatment of Chechens, and a history of independence before invasion by Russia as main motives. Russia has restored control over Chechnya, but the separatist government functions still in exile, though it has been split into two entities: the Akhmed Zakayev-run secular Chechen Republic (based in Poland, the United Kingdom, and the United States), and the Islamic Caucasus Emirate.

=== East Turkistan ===
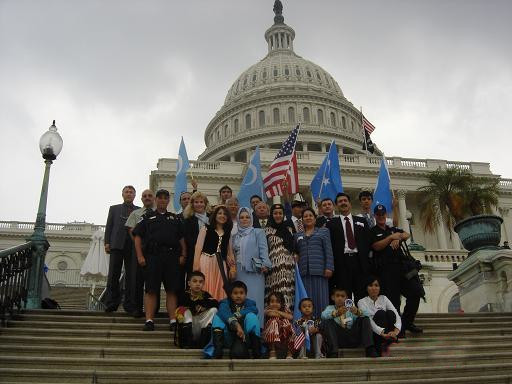
ETGE members at Capitol Hill on 14 September 2004

On November 12, 1933, Uyghurs, Kazakhs, Kyrgyz, and Uzbeks declared independence, establishing the First East Turkestan Republic, and again on November 12, 1944, forming the socialist Second East Turkestan Republic. Their primary motivations included self-determination against a history of colonization and oppression by the Manchu Qing Dynasty. The People's Republic of China assumed control over East Turkistan in late 1949. There is a robust movement advocating East Turkistani sovereignty, challenging the Chinese occupation since 2004, namely the East Turkistan Government in Exile is at the forefront of the East Turkistan Independence Movement.

=== Eastern Ukraine ===
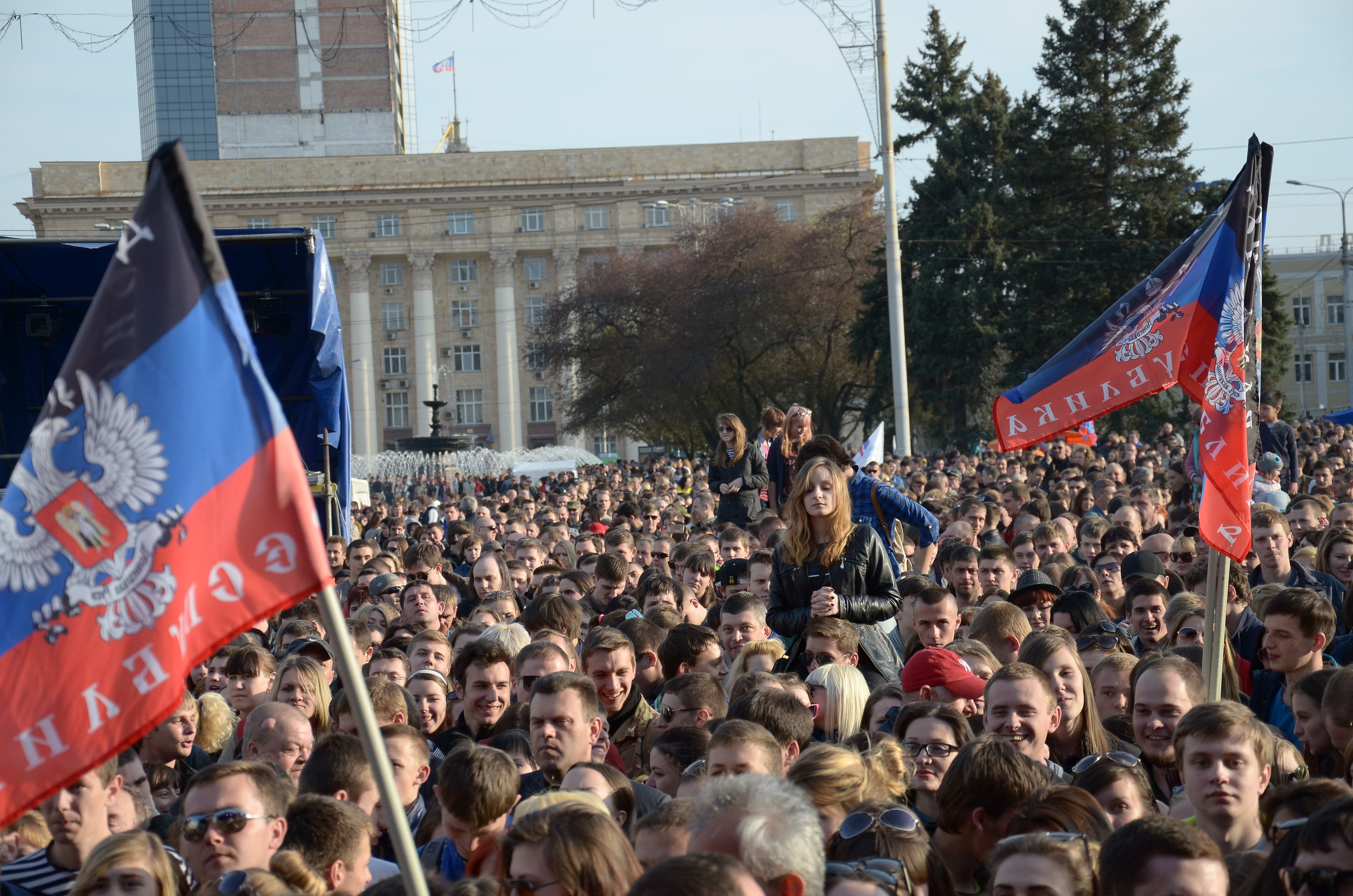
Pro-Russian separatists in Donetsk, April 2015

There is an active secessionist movement based on the self-determination of the residents of the eastern part of Donetsk and the southeastern part of the Luhansk regions of eastern Ukraine. However, many in the international community assert that referendums held there in 2014 regarding independence from Ukraine were illegitimate and undemocratic. Similarly, there are reports that presidential elections in May 2014 were prevented from taking place in the two regions after armed gunmen took control of polling stations, kidnapped election officials, and stole lists of electors, thus denying the population the chance to express their will in a free, fair, and internationally recognised election. There are also arguments that the de facto separation of Eastern Ukraine from the rest of the country is not an expression of self-determination, but rather motivated by revival of pro-Soviet sentiment and an invasion by neighbouring Russia, with Ukrainian President Petro Poroshenko claiming in 2015 that up to 9,000 Russian soldiers were deployed in Ukraine. Similarly, Russian President Vladimir Putin defended the annexation of Crimea by claiming it to be an act of self-determination of the Crimean people.

=== Ethiopia ===
The Federal Democratic Republic of Ethiopia is run as a federation of semi-self-governing nation states. The Constitution of Ethiopia firmly mentions the self-determining nature of its states. The actual implementation of its states self-governance is debatable.

=== Falkland Islands ===
Self-determination is referred to in the Falkland Islands Constitution and is a factor in the Falkland Islands sovereignty dispute. The population has existed for over nine generations, continuously for over 190 years. In the 2013 referendum, organised by the Falkland Islands Government, 99.8% voted to remain British. As administering power, the British Government deemed that transfer of sovereignty to Argentina would be counter to the Falkland Islander right to self-determination, since the majority of Falkland Island inhabitants wished to remain British.

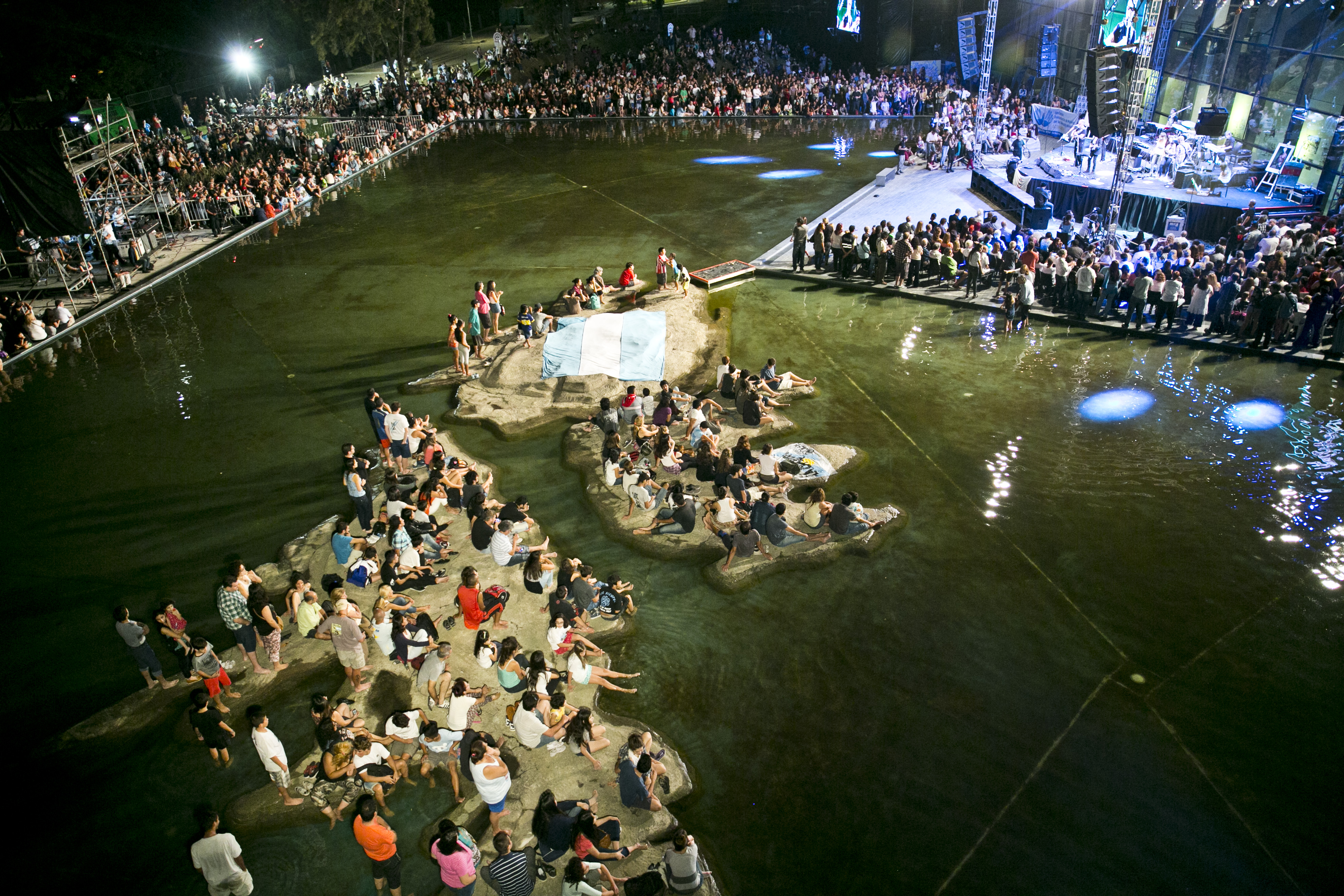
Malvinas and South Atlantic Islands Museum in Buenos Aires, 2015

Argentina states that the principle of self-determination is not applicable to the islands since the current inhabitants are not aboriginal and were brought to replace the Argentine population, which was expelled by an 'act of force', compelling the Argentinian inhabitants to directly leave the islands. This refers to the re-establishment of British rule in the year 1833 during which Argentina claims the existing population living in the islands was expelled. Argentina thus argues that, in the case of the Falkland Islands, the principle of territorial integrity should have precedence over self-determination. Historical records dispute Argentina's claims and whilst acknowledging the garrison was expelled note the existing civilian population remained at Port Louis. There was no attempt to settle the islands until 1841.

=== Gibraltar ===
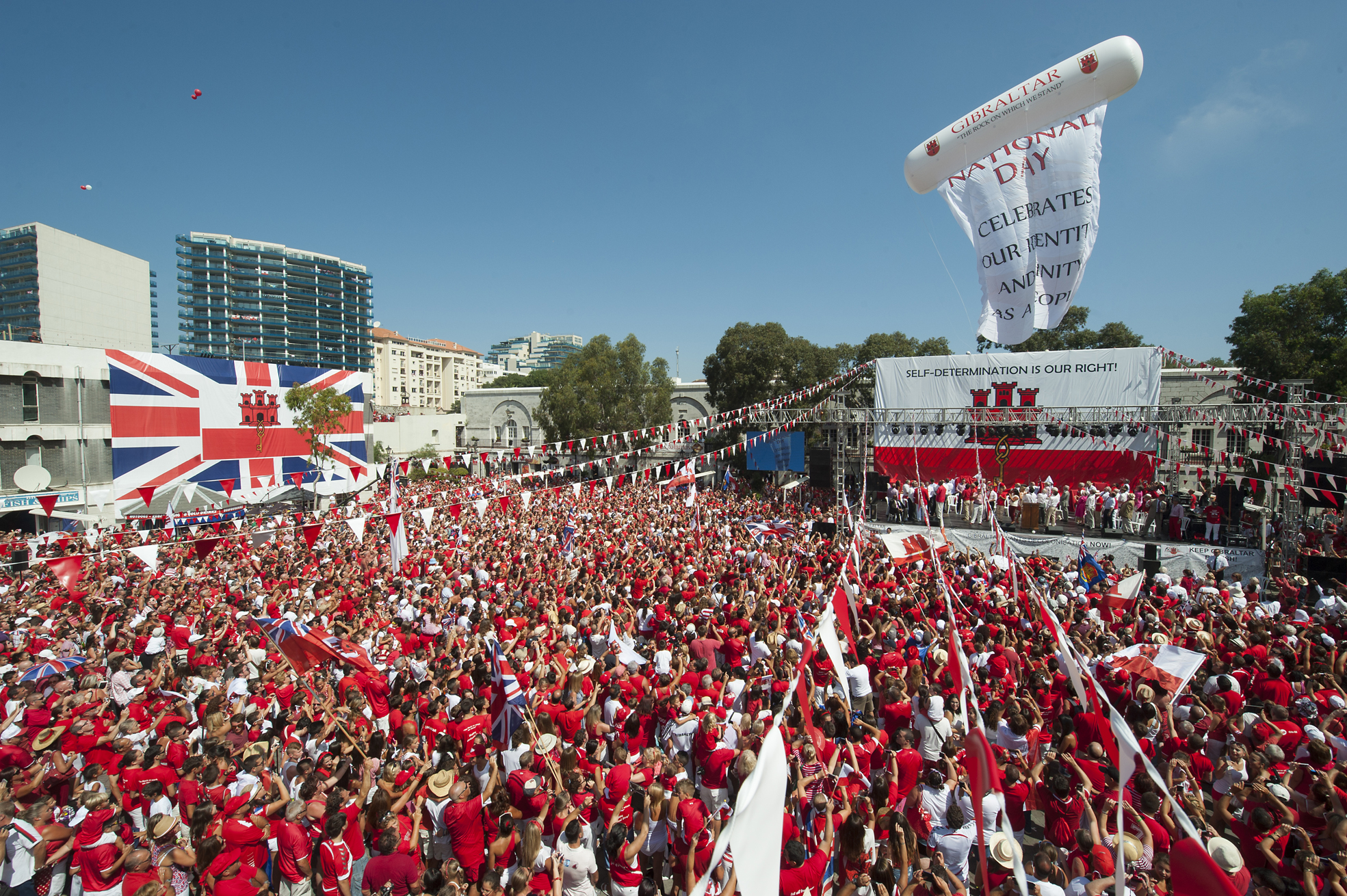
Gibraltar National Day, September 2013

The right to self-determination is referred to in the preamble of Chapter 1 of the Gibraltar constitution, and, since the United Kingdom also gave assurance that the right to self-determination of Gibraltarians would be respected in any transfer of sovereignty over the territory, is a factor in the dispute with Spain over the territory. The impact of the right to self-determination of Gibraltarians was seen in the 2002 Gibraltar sovereignty referendum, where Gibraltarian voters overwhelmingly rejected a plan to share sovereignty over Gibraltar between the UK and Spain. However, the UK government differs with the Gibraltarian government in that it considers Gibraltarian self-determination to be limited by the Treaty of Utrecht, which prevents Gibraltar achieving independence without the agreement of Spain, a position that the Gibraltarian government does not accept.

The Spanish government denies that Gibraltarians have the right to self-determination, considering them to be "an artificial population without any genuine autonomy" and not "indigenous". However, the Partido Andalucista has agreed to recognise the right to self-determination of Gibraltarians.

=== Hong Kong ===
Before the United Nations' adoption of resolution 2908 (XXVII) on 2 November 1972, The People's Republic of China vetoed the former British colony of Hong Kong's right to self-determination on 8 March 1972. This sparked several nations' protest along with Great Britain's declaration on 14 December that the decision is invalid. Decades later, an independence movement, dubbed as the Hong Kong independence movement emerged in the now Communist Chinese controlled territory. It advocates the autonomous region to become a fully independent sovereign state.

The city is considered a special administrative region (SAR) which, according to the PRC, enjoys a high degree of autonomy under the People's Republic of China (PRC), guaranteed under Article 2 of Hong Kong Basic Law^{[1]} (which is ratified under the Sino-British Joint Declaration), since the handover of Hong Kong from the United Kingdom to the PRC in 1997. Since the handover, many Hongkongers are increasingly concerned about Beijing's growing encroachment on the territory's freedoms and the failure of the Hong Kong government to deliver 'true' democracy.^{[2]}

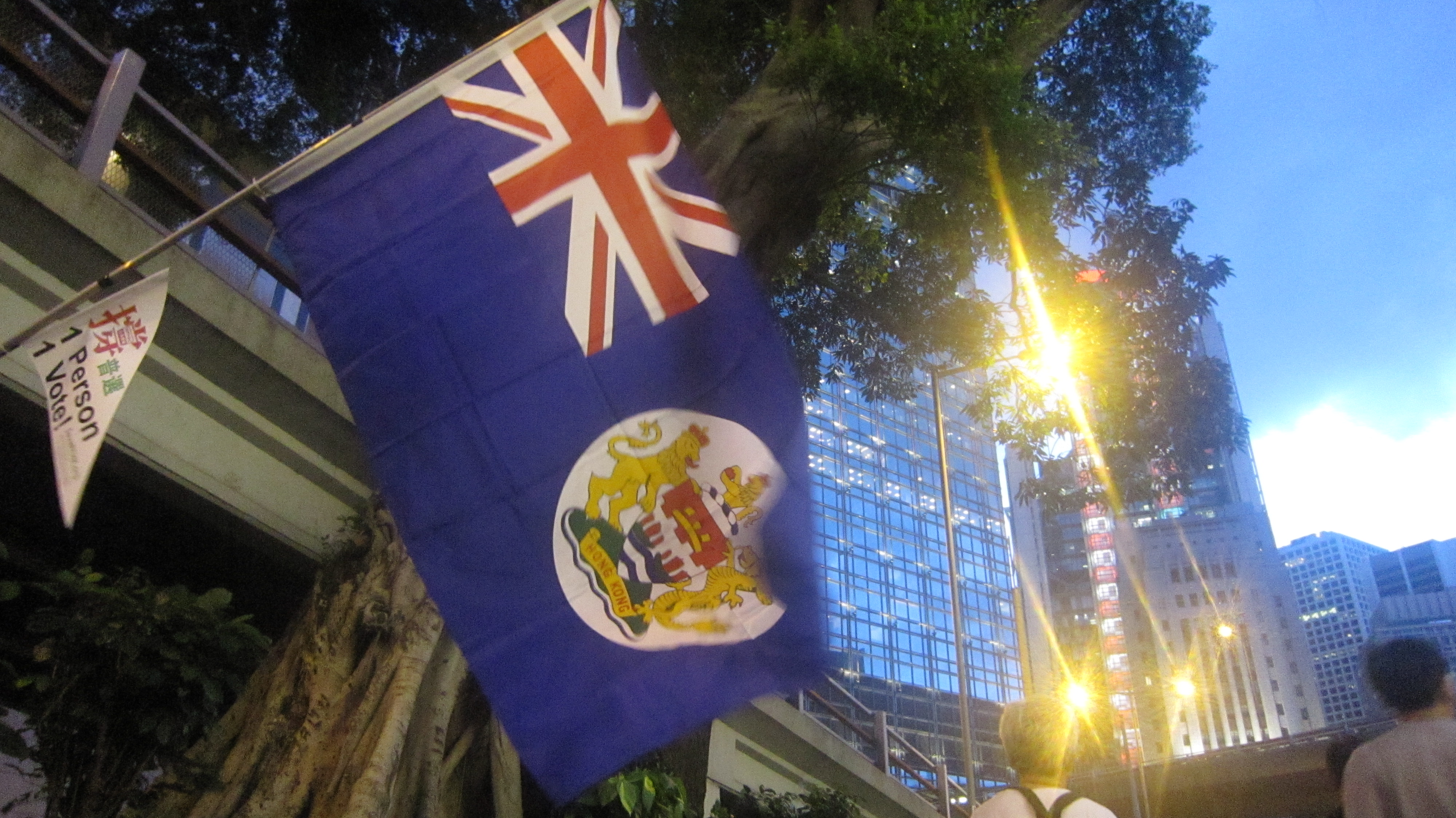
Pro-independence Hong Kong flag put up before a football match between the Hong Kong Football Team and the China national football team

The 2014–15 Hong Kong electoral reform package deeply divided the city, as it allowed Hongkongers to have universal suffrage, but Beijing would have authority to screen the candidates to restrict the electoral method for the Chief Executive of Hong Kong (CE), the highest-ranking official of the territory. This sparked the 79-day massive peaceful protests which was dubbed as the "Umbrella Revolution" and the pro-independence movement emerged on the Hong Kong political scene.^{[2]}

Since then, localism has gained momentum, particularly after the failure of the peaceful Umbrella Movement. Young localist leaders have led numerous protest actions against pro-Chinese policies to raise awareness of social problems of Hong Kong under Chinese rule. These include the sit-in protest against the Bill to Strengthen Internet Censorship, demonstrations against Chinese political interference in the University of Hong Kong, the Recover Yuen Long protests and the 2016 Mong Kok civil unrest. According to a survey conducted by the Chinese University of Hong Kong (CUHK) in July 2016, 17.4% of respondents supported the city becoming an independent entity after 2047, while 3.6% stated that it is "possible".^{[3]}

=== Indigenous peoples ===
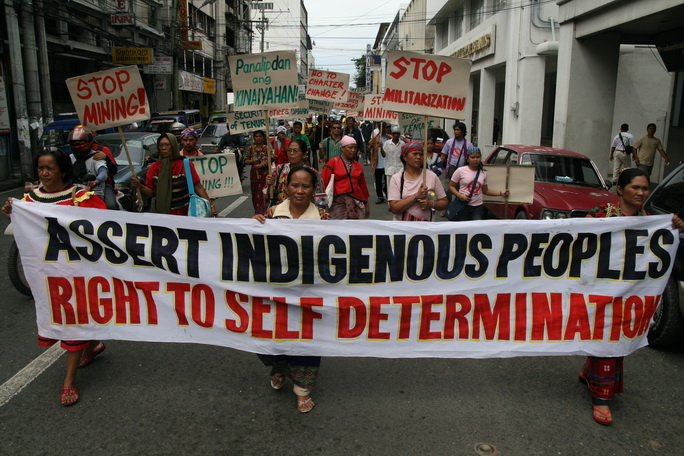
Lumads in Davao City marching for the right to self-determination as part of the human rights in Philippines in 2008

Indigenous peoples have claimed through the 2007 Declaration on the Rights of Indigenous Peoples the term peoples, and gaining with it the right to self-determination. Though it was also established that it is merely a right within existing sovereign states, peoples also need territory and a central government to reach sovereignty in international politics.

=== Israel ===
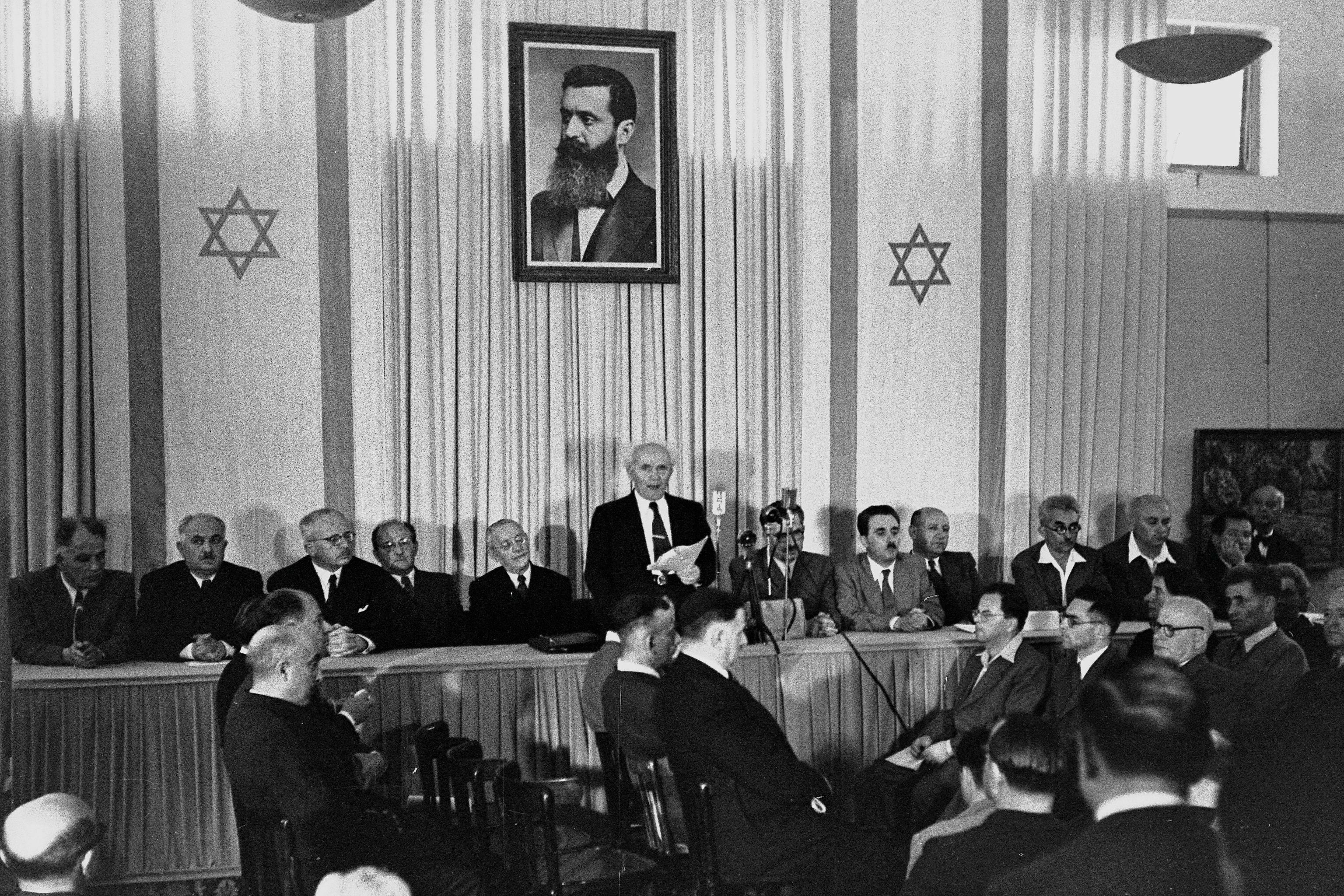
David Ben-Gurion proclaiming Israel's independence beneath a large portrait of Theodor Herzl

Zionism is a nationalist ideology founded by Theodor Herzl which claims a right of historic entitlement by descent as a nation, to exercise self-demination for all Jewish people in the region of Palestine/ancient Israel/land of Israel. The successful implementation of this vision led to the establishment of the State of Israel in 1948.

There were also votes of self-determination among the Jewish people prior to the votes of self-determination which created State of Israel such as the Great Sanhedrin called by Napoleon I to answer twelve questions to regarding the legal identity and other matters regarding Jews. These questions and answers were:

1. Is it lawful for Jews to have more than one wife? No.
2. Is divorce allowed within Judaism? Yes, but it must be officiated by Jewish administrator and also be declared publicly by civil authorities.
3. May a Jew marry a Gentile and if so, is the child Jewish? Yes, but they must assume the Jewish religion and agree to the marriage contract.
4. In the eyes of Jews is a Frenchman who is not a Jew considered as their brethren? Yes.
5. In the eyes of Jews is a Frenchman who is not a Jew to be treated as equals? Yes.
6. Do Jews who were born in France, and who are considered French citizens by French law, acknowledge France as their country? Would they defend it and would they obey the laws of France? Yes.
7. Who elects the Rabbis? Answered at length, each Jewish congregations elects their Rabbi.
8. What kind of police jurisdiction do Rabbis have? Answered at length, each independently determined by ancient custom and law.
9. Is the election process formed by Judaism or did it arise from social customs? Answered at length, the virtue of right to hold an office of authority is determined by ancient custom and law.
10. What professions may a Jew not hold? Any
11. May a Jew commit usury or defraud another Jew? No.
12. May a Jew commit usury or defraud a Gentile? No.

The American Jewish community from 1855 to 1939 creating a process for organizing the Jewry of America. During these several conferences the Reform community was recognized as Jewish, those who had converted away from Judaism were recognized as Gentiles regardless of ancestry, and those who practiced or adopted eugenic beliefs were deemed not Jewish. Eventually these discussions spawned the United Jewish Appeal whose council was sought by the government of United States of America to determine who is and is not considered Jewish for the purpose of creating a Special Refugee Quota in response to the influx of refugees fleeing the Holocaust.

Additionally, the Jewish Orthodox community united from 1868 to 1896 as the First Jewish Hungarian Congress to perform the same due to the formations of divergent communities. The congress determined there were three main frameworks for Judaism: The Congress (Reform), The Orthodox (Orthodox), and the Status Quo (Conservative). During congress it became apparent that the non-Orthodox communities generally agreed or deferred to the Orthodoxy rulings and disbanded. Nonetheless, there were Harem or public excommunications of certain groups who had claimed the Jewish identity while at the same time drastically or fundamentally altered Judaism such as the Modern Orthodox founded by Azriel Hildesheimer who altered Kashrut and assimilated other non-Jewish customs.

Concurrent with the First Jewish Hungarian Congress after the Reform and Conservative Jewish communities in central Europe held the First Jewish Synod and Second Jewish Synod in central Europe where the differences between Reform Judaism and Conservative Judaism were identified and the modernization of Jewish music and the including of music during religious service and holidays was determined.

=== Kashmir ===
The insurgency in Kashmir against Indian rule has existed in various forms. A widespread armed insurgency started in Kashmir against India rule in 1989 after allegations of rigging by the Indian government in the 1987 Jammu and Kashmir state election. This led to some parties in the state assembly forming militant wings, which acted as a catalyst for the emergence of armed insurgency in the region. The conflict over Kashmir has resulted in tens of thousands of deaths.

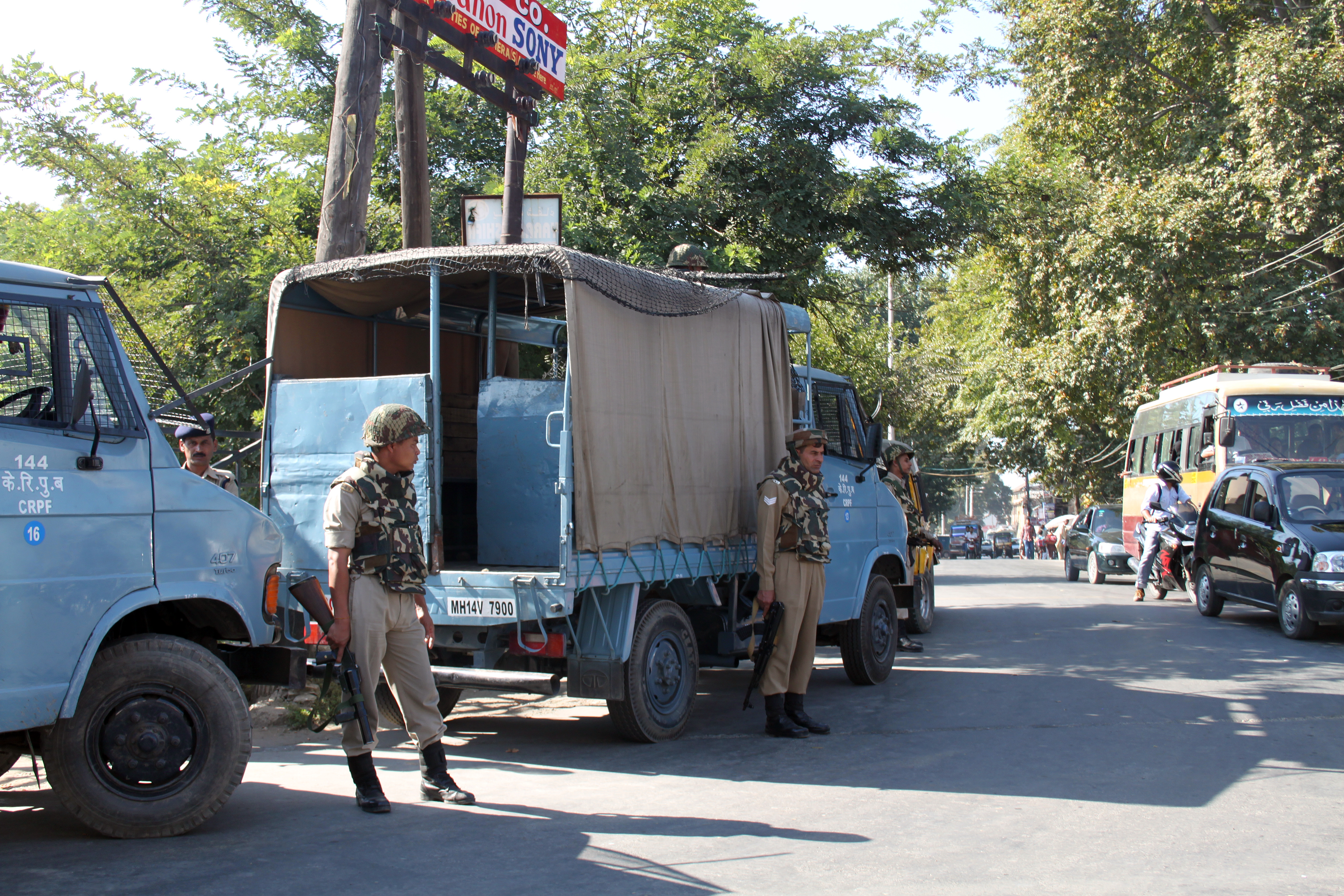
Indian soldiers on the streets of Kashmir during the 2016 unrests

The Inter-Services Intelligence of Pakistan has been accused by India of supporting and training both pro-Pakistan and pro-independence militants to fight Indian security forces in Jammu and Kashmir, a charge that Pakistan denies. According to official figures released in the Jammu and Kashmir assembly, there were 3,400 disappearance cases and the conflict has left more than 47,000 to 100,000 people dead as of July 2009. However, violence in the state had fallen sharply after the start of a slow-moving peace process between India and Pakistan. After the peace process failed in 2008, mass demonstrations against Indian rule, and low-scale militancy emerged again.

However, despite boycott calls by separatist leaders in 2014, the Jammu and Kashmir Assembly elections saw highest voters turnout in last 25 years since insurgency erupted.

=== Kurdistan ===
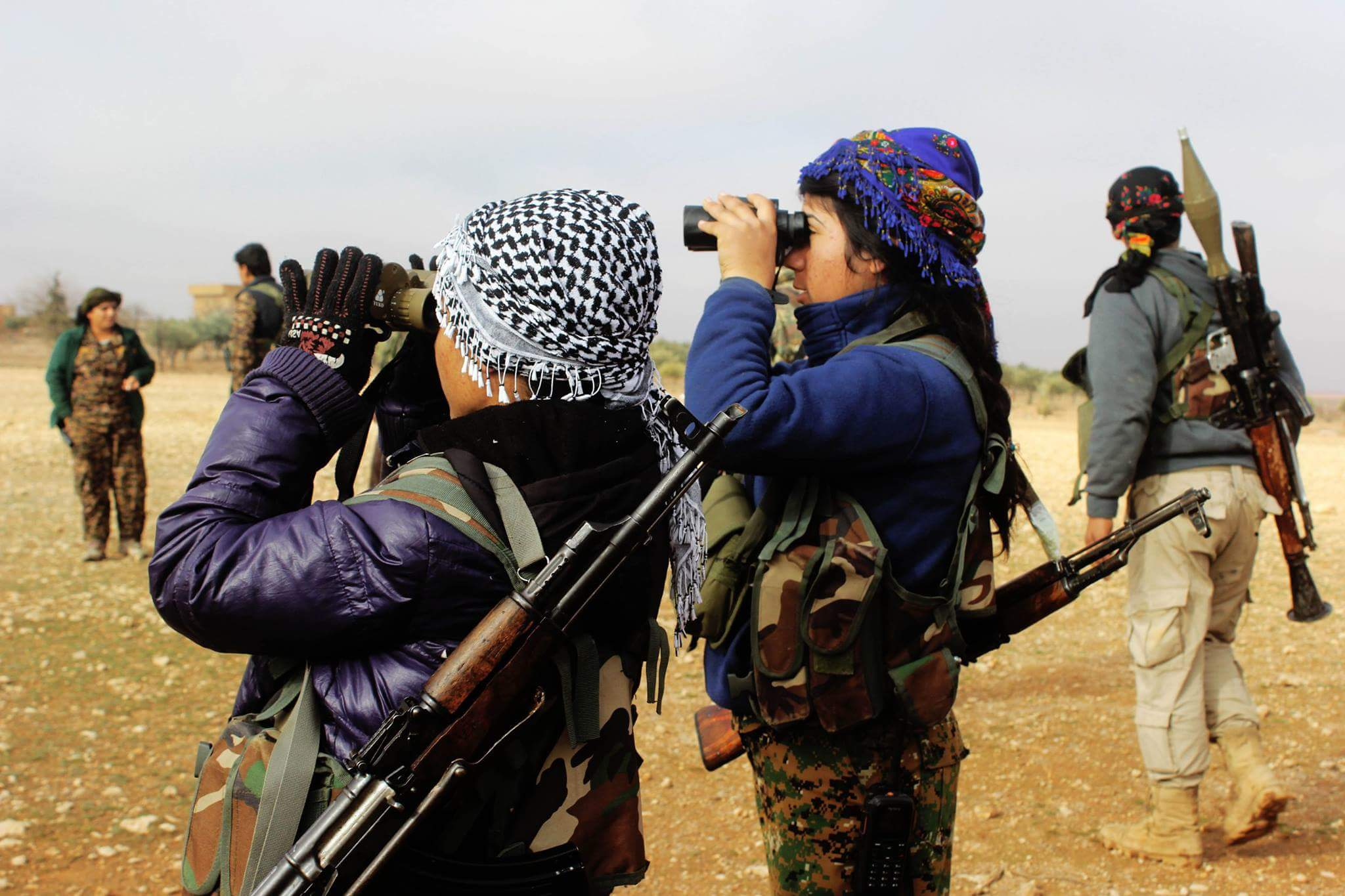
Kurdish YPG's female fighters during the Syrian War

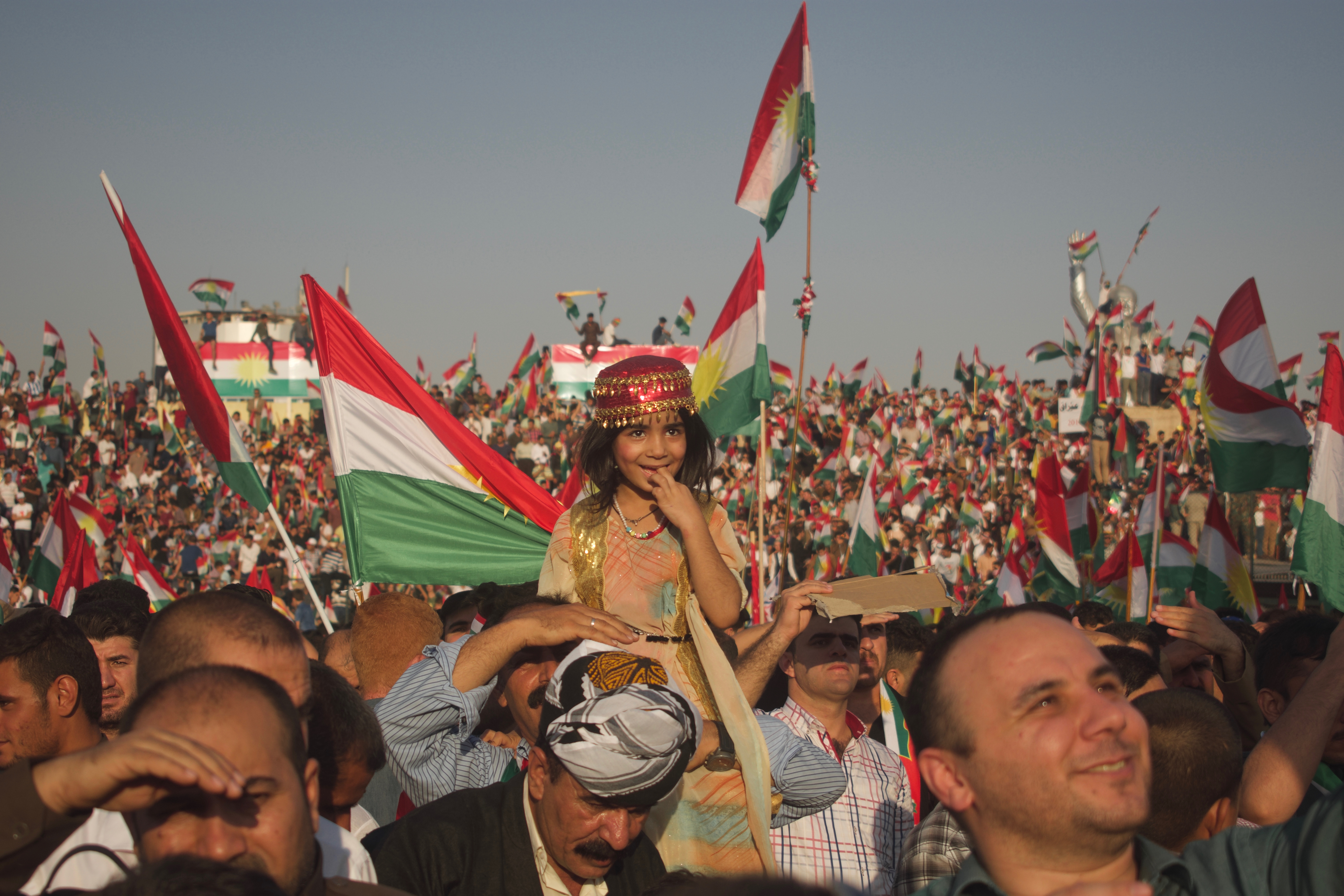
Pro-independence rally in Erbil, Kurdistan Region, September 2017

Kurdistan is a historical region primarily inhabited by the Kurdish people of the Middle East. The territory is currently part of Turkey, Iraq, Syria and Iran. There are Kurdish self-determination movements in each of the four states. Iraqi Kurdistan has to date achieved the largest degree of self-determination through the formation of the Kurdistan Regional Government, an entity recognised by the Iraqi Federal Constitution.

Although the right of the creation of a Kurdish state was recognized following World War I in the Treaty of Sèvres, the treaty was then annulled by the Treaty of Lausanne (1923). To date, two separate Kurdish republics and one Kurdish Kingdom have declared sovereignty: The Republic of Ararat (Ağrı Province, Turkey), the Republic of Mehabad (West Azerbaijan Province, Iran) and the Kingdom of Kurdistan (Sulaymaniyah Governorate, Iraqi Kurdistan, Iraq); each of these fledgling states was crushed by military intervention. The Patriotic Union of Kurdistan, which currently holds the Iraqi presidency and the Kurdistan Democratic Party which governs the Kurdistan Regional Government, both explicitly commit themselves to the development of Kurdish self-determination, but opinions vary as to the question of self-determination sought within the current borders and countries.

Efforts towards Kurdish self-determination are considered illegal separatism by the governments of Turkey and Iran, and the movement is politically repressed in both states. This is intertwined with Kurdish nationalist insurgencies in Iran and in Turkey, which in turn justify and are justified by the repression of peaceful advocacy. In Syria, a self-governing local Kurdish-dominated polity was established in 2012, amongst the upheaval of the Syrian Civil War, but has not been recognized by any foreign state.

=== Nagalim ===
Naga refers to a vaguely defined conglomeration of distinct tribes living on the border of India and Burma. Each of these tribes lived in a sovereign village before the arrival of the British but developed a common identity as the area was Christianized. After the British left India, a section of Nagas under the leadership of Angami Zapu Phizo sought to establish a separate country for the Nagas. Phizo's group, the Naga National Council (NNC), claimed that 99. 9% of the Nagas wanted an independent Naga country according to a referendum conducted by it. It waged a secessionist insurgency against the Government of India. The NNC collapsed after Phizo got his dissenters killed or forced them to seek refuge with the Government. Phizo escaped to London, while NNC's successor secessionist groups continued to stage violent attacks against the Indian Government. The Naga People's Convention (NPC), another major Naga organization, was opposed to the secessionists. Its efforts led to the creation of a separate Nagaland state within India in 1963. The secessionist violence declined considerably after the Shillong Accord of 1975. However, three factions of the National Socialist Council of Nagaland (NSCN) continue to seek an independent country which would include parts of India and Burma. They envisage a sovereign, predominantly Christian nation called "Nagalim".

=== North Borneo and Sarawak ===
Another controversial episode with perhaps more relevance was the British beginning their exit from British Malaya. An experience concerned the findings of a United Nations Assessment Team that led the British territories of North Borneo and Sarawak in 1963 to determine whether or not the populations wished to become a part of the new Malaysia Federation. The United Nation Team's mission followed on from an earlier assessment by the British-appointed Cobbold Commission which had arrived in the territories in 1962 and held hearings to determine public opinion. It also sifted through 1600 letters and memoranda submitted by individuals, organisations and political parties. Cobbold concluded that around two-thirds of the population favoured to the formation of Malaysia, while the remaining third wanted either independence or continuing control by the United Kingdom. The United Nations team largely confirmed these findings, which were later accepted by the General Assembly, and both territories subsequently wish to form the new Federation of Malaysia. The conclusions of both the Cobbold Commission and the United Nations team were arrived at without any referendums of self-determination being held. Unlike in Singapore, however, no referendum was ever conducted in Sarawak and North Borneo. They sought to consolidate several of the previous ruling entities; the Manila Accord, an agreement between the Philippines, Federation of Malaya and Indonesia, followed on 31 July 1963 to abide by the wishes of the people of North Borneo and Sarawak within the context of United Nations General Assembly Resolution 1541 (XV), Principle 9 of the Annex, taking into account referendums in North Borneo and Sarawak that would be free and without coercion. This also triggered the Indonesian confrontation because Indonesia opposed the violation of the agreements.

=== Northern Cyprus ===
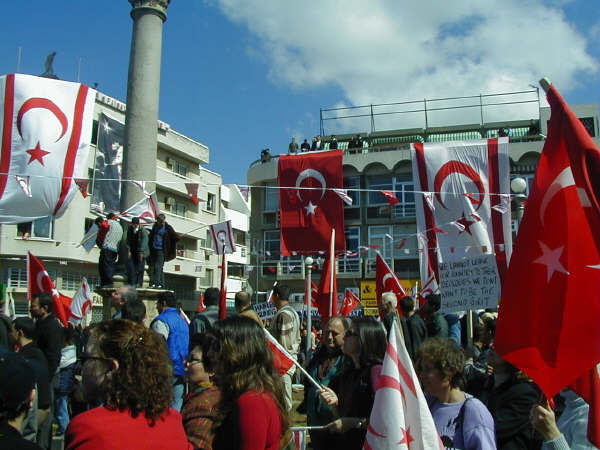
Atatürk Square, North Nicosia in 2006, with the Northern Cyprus and Turkish flags

Cyprus was settled by Mycenaean Greeks in two waves in the 2nd millennium BC. As a strategic location in the Middle East, it was subsequently occupied by several major powers, including the empires of the Assyrians, Egyptians and Persians, from whom the island was seized in 333 BC by Alexander the Great. Subsequent rule by Ptolemaic Egypt, the Classical and Eastern Roman Empire, Arab caliphates for a short period and the French Lusignan dynasty. Following the death in 1473 of James II, the last Lusignan king, the Republic of Venice assumed control of the island, while the late king's Venetian widow, Queen Catherine Cornaro, reigned as figurehead. Venice formally annexed the Kingdom of Cyprus in 1489, following the abdication of Catherine. The Venetians fortified Nicosia by building the Walls of Nicosia, and used it as an important commercial hub.

Although the Lusignan French aristocracy remained the dominant social class in Cyprus throughout the medieval period, the former assumption that Greeks were treated only as serfs on the island is no longer considered by academics to be accurate. It is now accepted that the medieval period saw increasing numbers of Greek Cypriots elevated to the upper classes, a growing Greek middle ranks, and the Lusignan royal household even marrying Greeks. This included King John II of Cyprus who married Helena Palaiologina.

Throughout Venetian rule, the Ottoman Empire frequently raided Cyprus. In 1539, the Ottomans destroyed Limassol and so fearing the worst, the Venetians also fortified Famagusta and Kyrenia.

Having invaded in 1570, Turks controlled and solely governed all of the Cyprus island from 1571 until its leasing to the British Empire in 1878. Cyprus was placed under British administration based on Cyprus Convention in 1878 and formally annexed by Britain at the beginning of World War I in 1914. While Turkish Cypriots made up 18% of the population, the partition of Cyprus and creation of a Turkish state in the north became a policy of Turkish Cypriot leaders and the Republic of Turkey in the 1950s. Politically, there was no majority/minority relation between Greek Cypriots and Turkish Cypriots; and hence, in 1960, Republic of Cyprus was founded by the constituent communities in Cyprus (Greek Cypriots and Turkish Cypriots) as a non-unitary state; the 1960 Constitution set both Turkish and Greek as the official languages. During 1963–74, the island experienced ethnic clashes and turmoil, following the Greek nationalists' coup to unify the island to Greece, which led to the eventual Turkish invasion in 1974. Turkish Republic of Northern Cyprus was declared in 1983 and recognized only by Turkey. Monroe Leigh, 1990, The Legal Status in International Law of the Turkish Cypriot and the Greek Cypriot Communities in Cyprus. The Greek Cypriot and Turkish Cypriot regimes participating in these negotiations, and the respective communities which they represent, are presently entitled to exercise equal rights under international law, including rights of self-determination. Before the Turkey's invasion in 1974, Turkish Cypriots were concentrated in Turkish Cypriot enclaves in the island.

Northern Cyprus fulfills all the classical criteria of statehood. United Nations Peace Force in Cyprus (UNFICYP) operates based on the laws of Northern Cyprus in north of Cyprus island. According to European Court of Human Rights (ECtHR), the laws of Northern Cyprus is valid in the north of Cyprus. ECtHR did not accept the claim that the Courts of Northern Cyprus lacked "independence and/or impartiality". ECtHR directed all Cypriots to exhaust "domestic remedies" applied by Northern Cyprus before taking their cases to ECtHR. In 2014, the United States Federal Court qualified Turkish Republic of Northern Cyprus as a "democratic country". In 2017, the United Kingdom's High Court decided that "There was no duty in UK law upon the UK's Government to refrain from recognising Northern Cyprus. The United Nations itself works with Northern Cyprus law enforcement agencies and facilitates cooperation between the two parts of the island." UK's High Court also dismissed the claim that "cooperation between UK police and law agencies in northern Cyprus was illegal".

=== Palestine ===
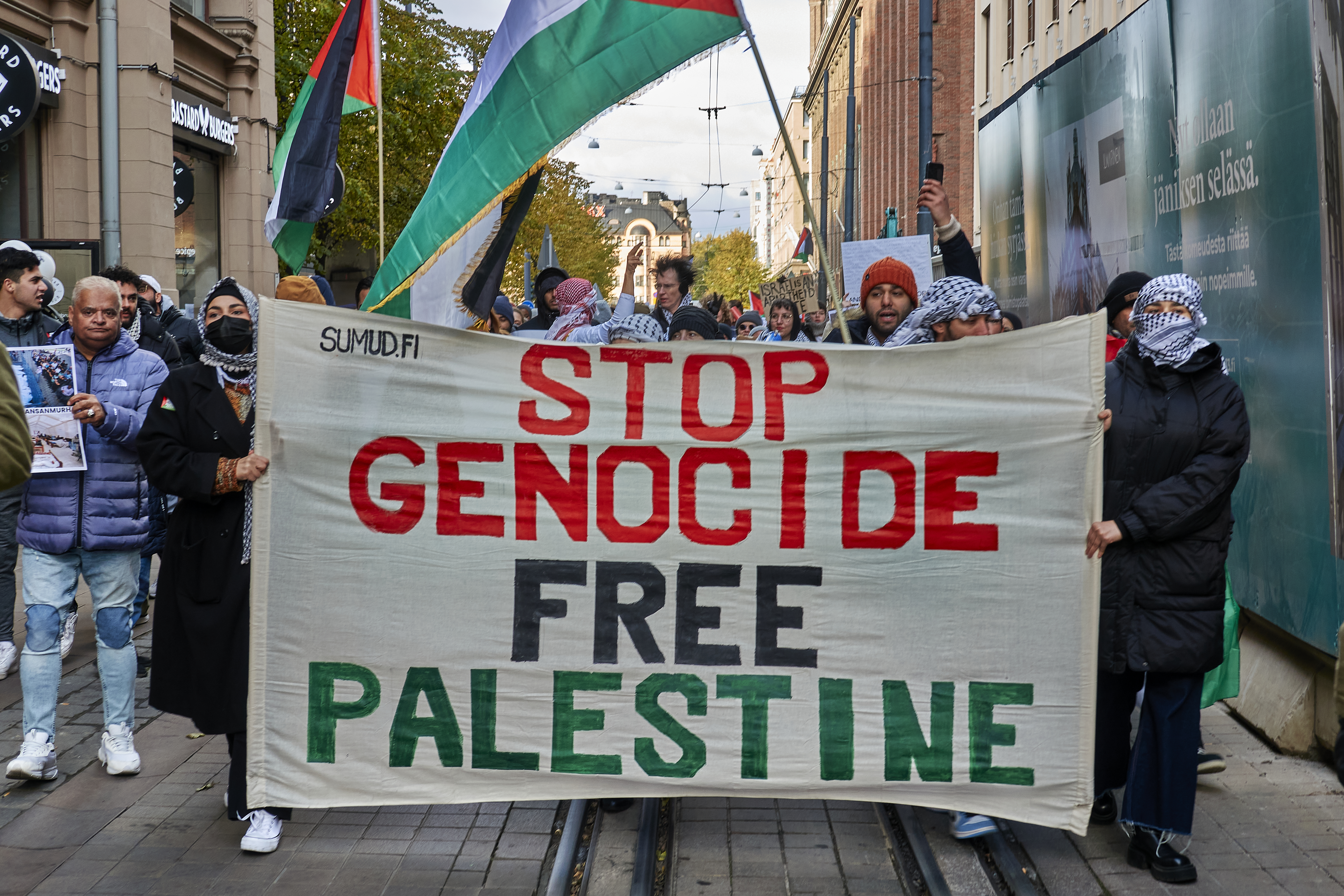
"Stop genocide, free Palestine" rally in Helsinki, 21 October 2023

Palestinian self-determination is the aspiration of some Palestinians and Palestinian nationalists for increased autonomy and sovereign independence, as well as to the international right of self-determination applied to Palestine. Such sentiments are features of both the one state solution and the two state solution. In the two state solution this usually denotes territorial integrity initiatives, such as resisting occupation in the West Bank, annexation efforts in East Jerusalem or freedom of movement along borders, as well the preservation of important sites such as al-Aqsa mosque.

=== Quebec ===
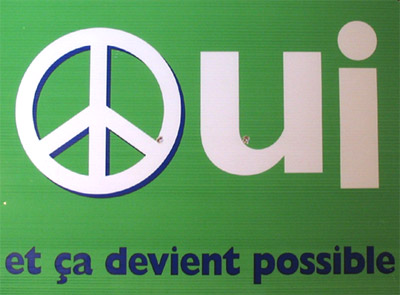
A poster for Quebec sovereignty during the 1995 referendum: Oui, et ça devient possible (French for 'Yes, and it becomes possible')

In Canada, many Francophone citizens in the Province of Quebec have wanted the province to separate from Confederation. The Parti Québécois has asserted Quebec's "right to self-determination." There is debate on under which conditions would this right be realized. French-speaking Quebec nationalism and support for maintaining Québécois culture would inspire Quebec nationalists, many of whom were supporters of the Quebec sovereignty movement during the late 20th century.

=== Sardinia ===
Sardinian nationalism or Sardism (Sardismu in Sardinian; Sardismo in Italian) is a social, cultural and political movement in Sardinia calling for the self-determination of the Sardinian people in a context of national devolution, further autonomy in Italy, or even outright independence from the latter. It also promotes the protection of the island's environment and the preservation of its cultural heritage.

Even though the island has been characterized by periodical waves of ethnonationalist protests against Rome, the Sardinian movement has its origins on the left of the political spectrum; regionalism and attempts for Sardinian self-determination historically countered in fact the Rome-centric Italian nationalism and fascism (which eventually managed to contain the autonomist and separatist tendencies).

=== Scotland ===
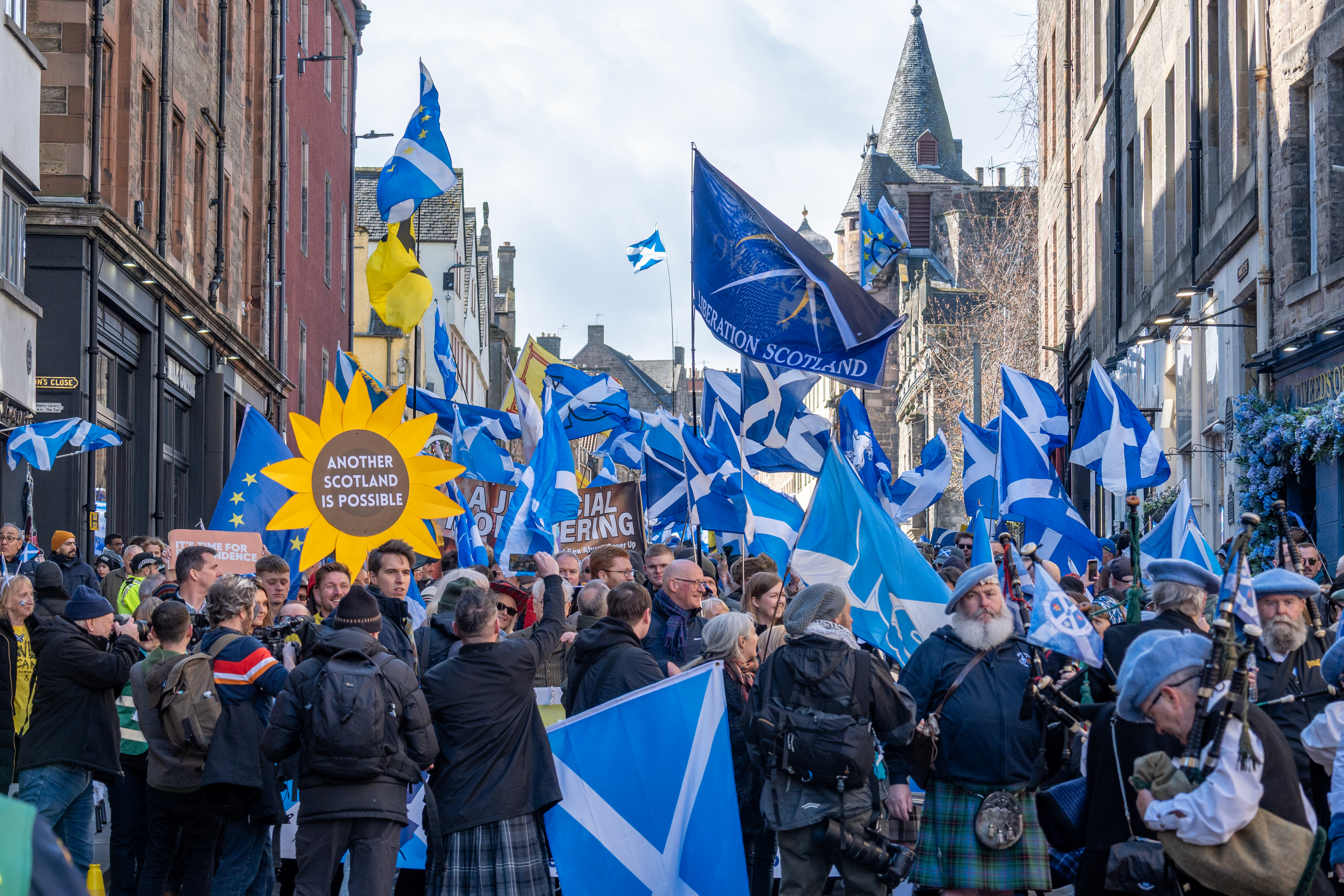
Scotland independence march in Edinburgh, 2026

Scotland ceased to exist as a sovereign state in 1707, as did England, when the Acts of Union (1707) created the unified Kingdom of Great Britain, but has a long-standing Scottish independence movement, with polls suggesting in January 2020 that 52% of eligible voters would vote for an independent Scotland. The country's largest political party, the Scottish National Party, campaigns for Scottish independence. A referendum on independence was held in 2014, where it was rejected by 55% of voters. The Independence debate continued throughout the UK referendum on EU membership where the electorate in Scotland voted by 62% to remain a member of the EU, as did Northern Ireland. Results in England and Wales, however, led to the whole of the United Kingdom leaving the EU. In late 2019, the Scottish Government announced plans to demand a second referendum on Scottish Independence. This was given assent by the Scottish Parliament but, as of July 2022, British Prime Minister Boris Johnson has refused to grant the Section 30 powers required to hold another referendum on the argument that both sides accepted beforehand that the 2014 vote would settle the matter for a generation.

=== South Africa ===
Section 235 of the South African Constitution allows for the right to self-determination of a community, within the framework of "the right of the South African people as a whole to self-determination", and pursuant to national legislation. This section of the constitution was one of the negotiated settlements during the handing over of political power in 1994. Supporters of an independent Afrikaner homeland have argued that their goals are reasonable under this new legislation.

=== South Tyrol ===
In Italy, South Tyrol/Alto Adige was annexed after the First World War. The German-speaking inhabitants of South Tyrol are protected by the Gruber-De Gasperi Agreement, but there are still supporters of the self determination of South Tyrol, e.g. the party Die Freiheitlichen and the South Tyrolean independence movement. At the end of World War II, Italian resistance troops entered South Tyrol and took over the administration against the wishes of the South Tyrolean resistance movement. The Allies subsequently granted South Tyrol to Italy, with the British foreign minister remarking that "in theory the Austrians have the better argument, however handing over the power stations of South Tyrol to them could openly give the Russians a helping hand with which they could pressurise Italy". The Allies pushed Italy to grant the region a high degree of autonomy, culminating in the Gruber–De Gasperi Agreement of 1946.

=== Székely Land ===
Following the First World War, large areas of the Kingdom of Hungary were annexed by Romania. Some of these areas were inhabited by an ethnic Hungarian population called Székelys. Ever since their homes were integrated into Romania, these people were trying to achieve some form of autonomy or self-governance.

=== Tibet ===
There are several movements in advocacy of the Tibetan sovereignty from the Chinese occupation since 1950. The Tibetan Government in-Exile is a notable example.

=== United States ===
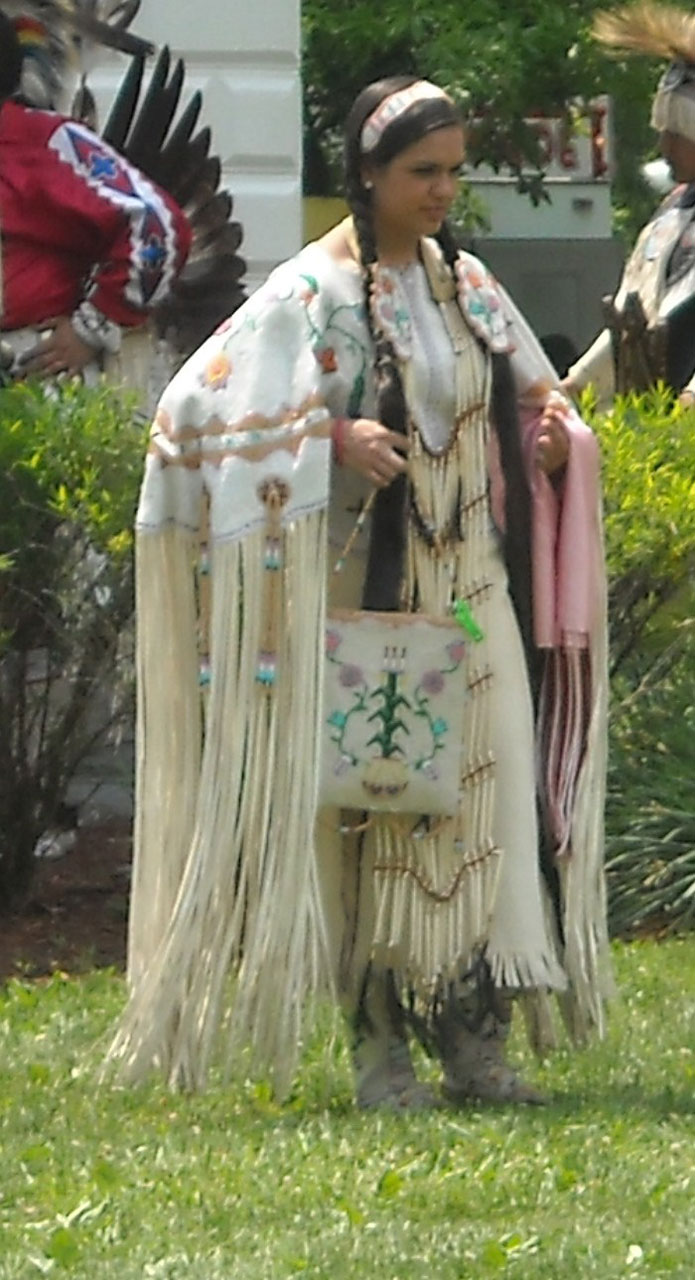
A Native American woman in traditional dress

The colonization of the North American continent and its Native American population has been the source of legal battles since the early 19th century. Many Native American tribes were resettled onto separate tracts of land (reservations), which have retained a certain degree of autonomy within the United States. The federal government recognizes Tribal Sovereignty and has established a number of laws attempting to clarify the relationship among the federal, state, and tribal governments. The Constitution and later federal laws recognize the local sovereignty of tribal nations, but do not recognize full sovereignty equivalent to that of foreign nations, hence the term "domestic dependent nations" to qualify the federally recognized tribes.

Certain Chicano nationalist groups seek to "recreate" an ethnic-based state to be called Aztlán, after the legendary homeland of the Aztecs. It would comprise the Southwestern United States, historic territory of indigenous peoples and their descendants, as well as colonists and later settlers under the Spanish colonial and Mexican governments. Supporters of the proposed state of New Afrika argue that the history of African-Americans productively living in several U.S. states in the Black Belt entitles them to establish an African-American republic in the area, alongside $400 billion as reparations for slavery.

There are several active Hawaiian autonomy or independence movements, each with the goal of realizing some level of political control over single or several islands. The groups range from those seeking territorial units similar to Indian reservations under the United States, with the least amount of independent control, to the Hawaiian sovereignty movement, which is projected to have the most independence. The Hawaiian Sovereignty movement seeks to revive the Hawaiian nation under the Hawaiian constitution.

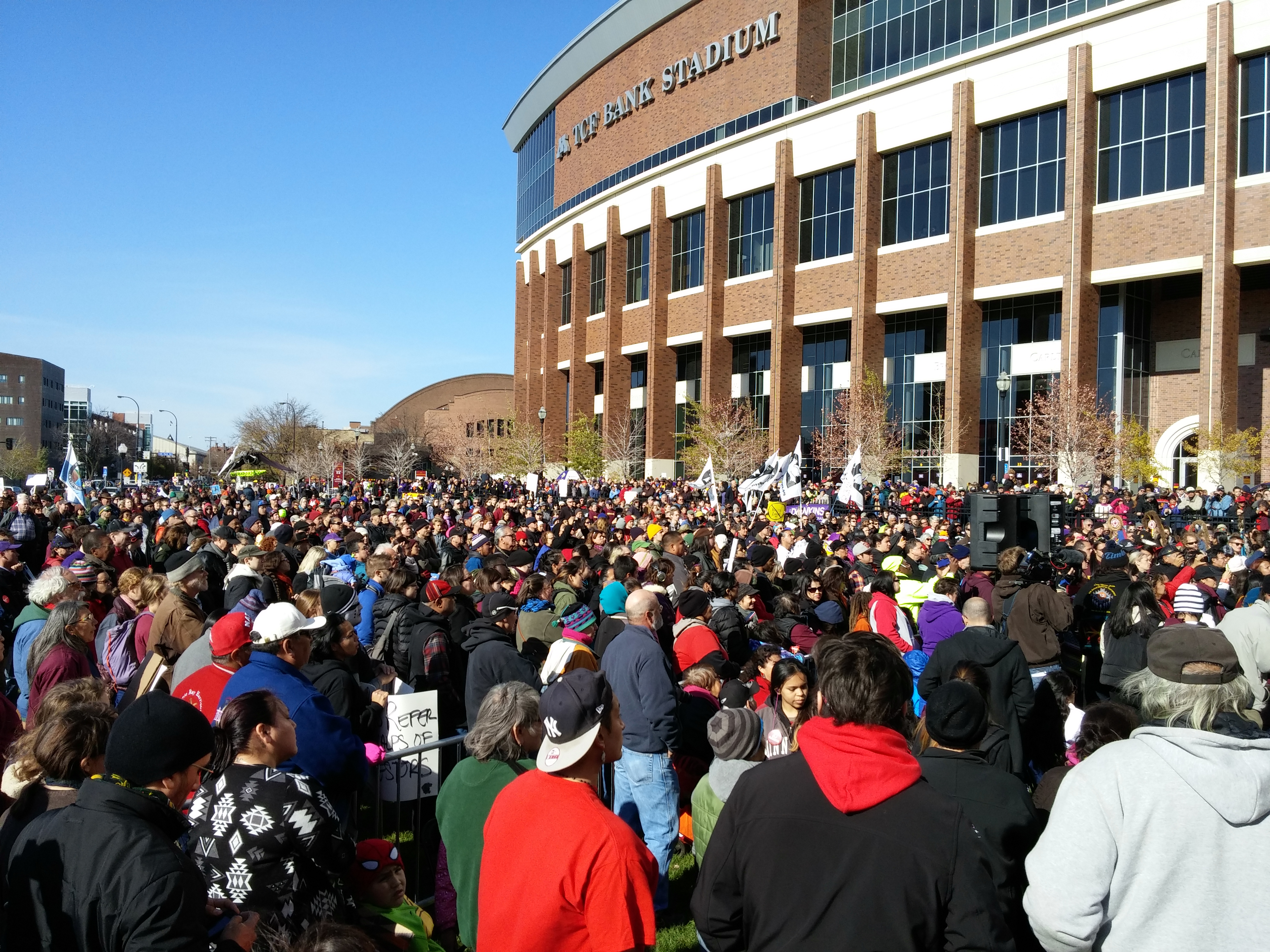
Native Americans and their supporters protest during the Washington Redskins name controversy.

Since 1972, the U.N. Decolonization Committee has called for Puerto Rico's "decolonization" and for the U.S. to recognize the island's right to self-determination and independence. In 2007, the Decolonization Subcommittee called for the United Nations General Assembly to review the political status of Puerto Rico, a power reserved by the 1953 Resolution. This followed the 1967 passage of a plebiscite act that provided for a vote on the status of Puerto Rico with three status options: continued commonwealth, statehood, and independence. In the first plebiscite, the commonwealth option won with 60.4% of the votes, but U.S. congressional committees failed to enact legislation to address the status issue. In subsequent plebiscites in 1993 and 1998, the status quo was favored.

In a referendum that took place in November 2012, a majority of Puerto Rican residents voted to change the territory's relationship with the United States, with the statehood option being the preferred option. But a large number of ballots—one-third of all votes cast—were left blank on the question of preferred alternative status. Supporters of the commonwealth status had urged voters to blank their ballots. When the blank votes are counted as anti-statehood votes, the statehood option would have received less than 50% of all ballots received. As of January 2014, Washington has not taken action to address the results of this plebiscite.

Many current U.S. state, regional and city secession groups use the language of self-determination. A 2008 Zogby International poll revealed that 22% of Americans believe that "any state or region has the right to peaceably secede and become an independent republic." For instance, the League of the South is a group that seeks "a free and independent Southern republic" made up of the former Confederate States of America. It operated a short-lived Southern Party supporting the right of states to secede from the Union or to legally nullify federal laws.

On December 15, 2022, the U.S. House of Representatives voted in favor of the Puerto Rico Status Act. The act sought to resolve Puerto Rico's status and its relationship to the United States through a binding plebiscite.

Since the late 20th century, some states periodically discuss desires to secede from the United States. Unilateral secession was ruled unconstitutional by the U.S. Supreme Court in Texas v. White (1869).

=== Western Sahara ===
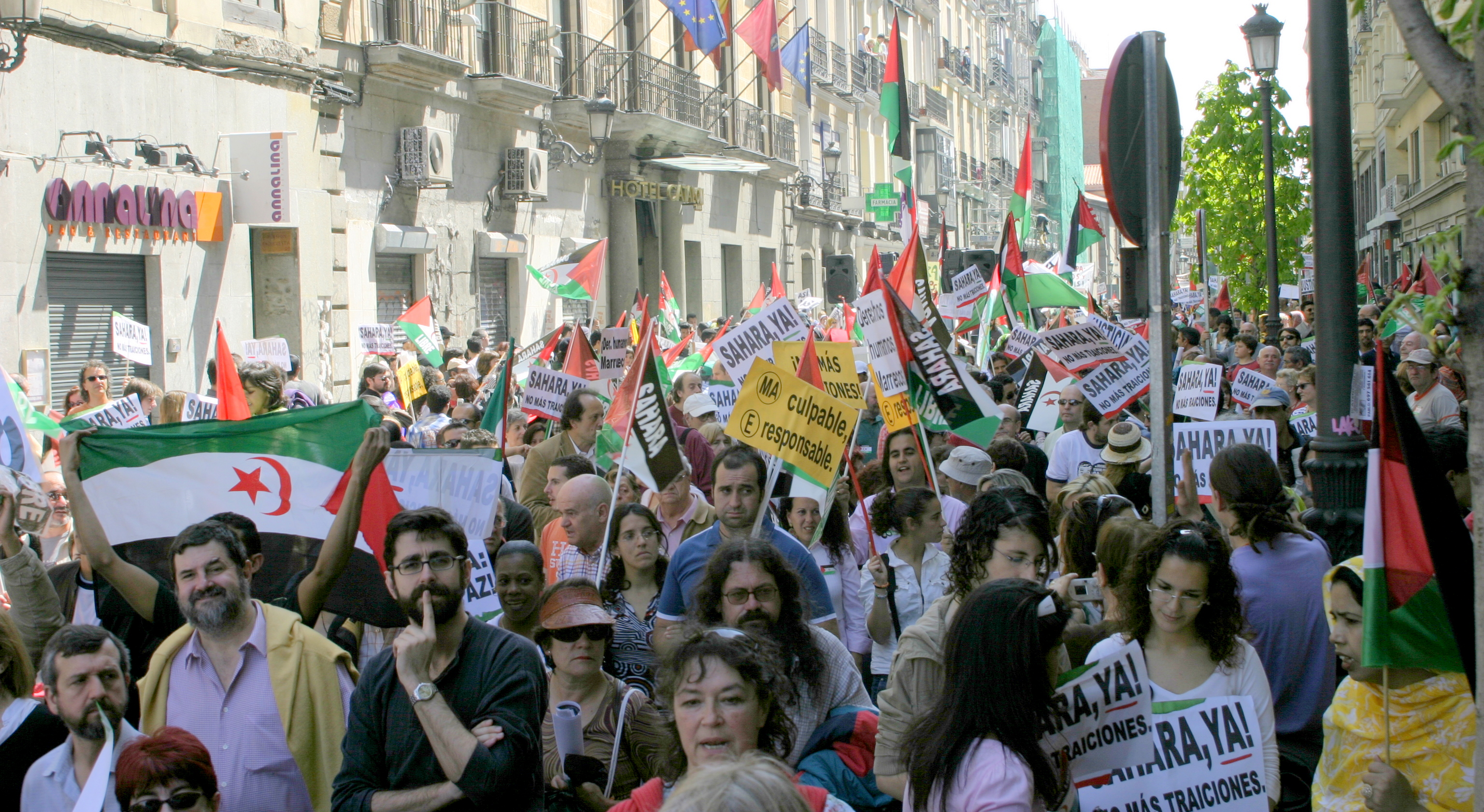
A demonstration in Madrid for the independence of Western Sahara, 2007

There is an active movement based on the self-determination of the Sahrawi people in the Western Saharan region. Morocco also claims the entire territory, and maintains control of about two-thirds of the region.

=== West Papua ===
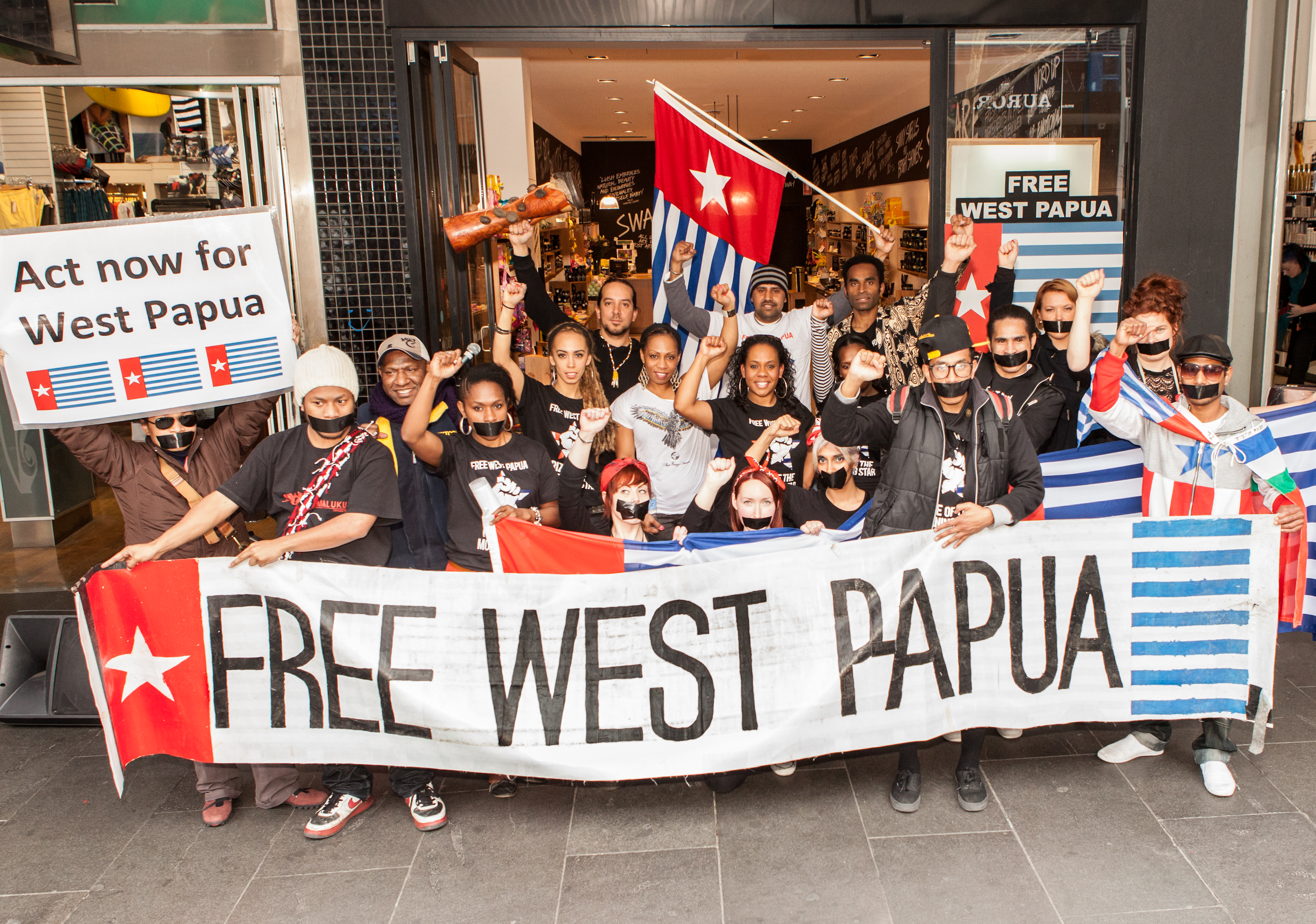
A Free West Papua protest in Melbourne in August 2012

The self-determination of the West Papuan people has been violently suppressed by the Indonesian Government since the withdrawal of Dutch colonial rule under the Dutch New Guinea in 1962.

=== Western Cape ===
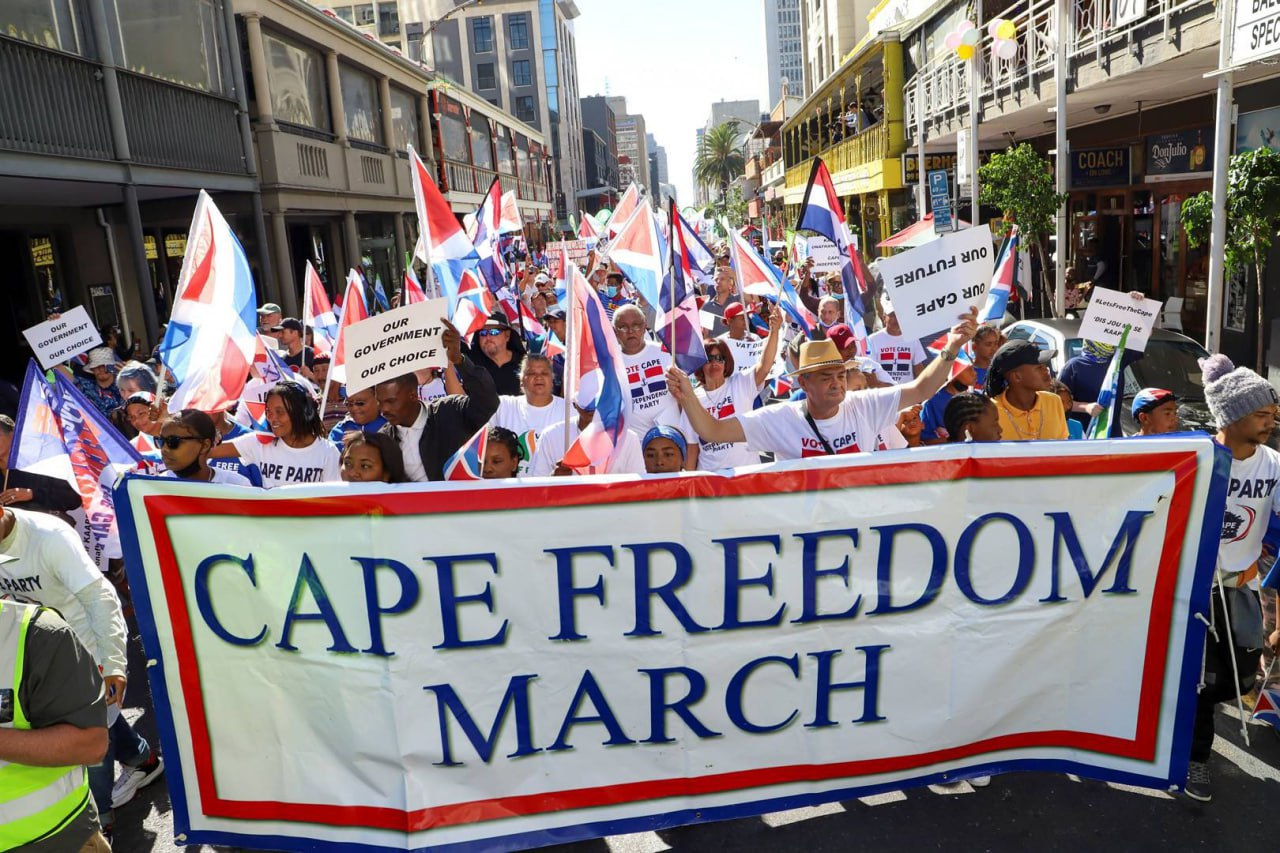
A march for Cape Independence, January 2023

Since the late 2000s, there has been growing calls for the people of the Western Cape province of South Africa to become an independent state. South Africa in its current form was created in 1910 after the South Africa Act 1909 was passed in the British parliament. The Cape Colony ceased to exist; however, many of its unique political and cultural quirks such as the Cape Liberal Tradition nevertheless continued to exist. Recent polling has shown that over 46% of Western Cape voters back independence outright.

== See also ==
- Anti-imperialism – Political stance in opposition to interventionist or expansionist policies
- Boundary problem (political science)
- Community for Democracy and Rights of Nations – Organization of unrecognized states
- Consent of the governed – Consent as source of political legitimacy
- Decolonization – Undoing political, economic and cultural legacies of colonisation
  - Special Committee on Decolonization – UN General Assembly special committee
  - United Nations list of non-self-governing territories – Type of territory defined by the United Nations Charter
- Ethnic separatism
- Ethnonationalism
- Ethnopluralism – Political model attempting to preserve separate and bordered ethno-cultural regions
- Independence movement
- Indigenous peoples
- International relations theory – Study of international relations from a theoretical perspective
- Irredentism – Territorial claim
- Liberalism and nationalism
- Legitimacy
- List of countries that have gained independence from the United Kingdom
- List of historical unrecognized states and dependencies
- List of national liberation movements recognized by intergovernmental organizations
- Lists of active separatist movements
- Nation-state
- National delimitation in the Soviet Union – Political process in the Soviet republics
- National personal autonomy – Principle in Austromarxism; expression of left-wing nationalism
- Non-Intervention
- Plurinationalism – Coexistence of two or more sealed or preserved national groups within a polity
- Popular sovereignty – Idea that the people are the source of all power
- Religious nationalism – Relationship between national identity and religion
- Right to exist – Conceptual right of nations
- Self-governance – Mode of governance
- Separatism – Advocacy for separation from a larger group
- Stateless nation – Ethnic group or nation that does not possess its own state
- Territorial integrity – Principle of international law
- United Nations General Assembly Resolution 1654 (XVI)
- Unrepresented Nations and Peoples Organization – International organization formed in 1991
- Wars of national liberation – Conflict fought for independence
- Decentralization

== Bibliography ==
- Rudolf A. Mark, "National Self-Determination, as Understood by Lenin and the Bolsheviks." Lithuanian Historical Studies (2008), Vol. 13, p 21–39. Online
- Abulof, Uriel and Cordell, Karl (eds.) (2015). Special Issue: Self-determination—A Double-edged Principle, Ethnopolitics 14(5).
- Danspeckgruber, Wolfgang F., ed. The Self-Determination of Peoples: Community, Nation, and State in an Interdependent World, Boulder: Lynne Rienner Publishers, 2002.
- Danspeckgruber, Wolfgang F., and Arthur Watts, eds. Self-Determination and Self-Administration: A Sourcebook, Boulder: Lynne Rienner Publishers, 1997.
- Allen Buchanan, Justice, Legitimacy, and Self-Determination: Moral Foundations for International Law (Oxford Political Theory), Oxford University Press, US, 2007.
- Annalisa Zinn, Globalization and Self-Determination (Kindle Edition), Taylor & Francis, 2007.
- Marc Weller, Autonomy, Self Governance and Conflict Resolution (Kindle Edition), Taylor & Francis, 2007.
- Valpy Fitzgerald, Frances Stewart, Rajesh Venugopal (Editors), Globalization, Violent Conflict and Self-Determination, Palgrave Macmillan, 2006.
- Joanne Barker (Editor), Sovereignty Matters: Locations of Contestation and Possibility in Indigenous Struggles for Self-Determination, University of Nebraska Press, 2005.
- David Raic, Statehood and the Law of Self-Determination (Developments in International Law, V. 43) (Developments in International Law, V. 43), Springer, 2002.
- Y.N. Kly and D. Kly, In pursuit of The Right to Self-determination, Collected Papers & Proceedings of the First International Conference on the Right to Self-Determination & the United Nations, Geneva 2000, Clarity Press, 2001.
- Antonio Cassese, Self-Determination of Peoples: A Legal Reappraisal (Hersch Lauterpacht Memorial Lectures), Cambridge University Press, 1999.
- Percy Lehning, Theories of Secession, Routledge, 1998.
- Malkasian, Mark (1996). Gha-ra-bagh!: The Emergence of the National Democratic Movement in Armenia. Detroit: Wayne State University Press. ISBN 0-8143-2605-6.
- Hurst Hannum, Autonomy, Sovereignty, and Self-Determination: The Accommodation of Conflicting Rights, University of Pennsylvania Press, 1996.
- Temesgen Muleta-Erena, The political and Cultural Locations of National Self-determination: The Oromia Case, Oromia Quarterly, Vol. II, No. 2, 1999. ISSN 1460-1346.
