= Judaism in Motion =

- Judaïsme en mouvement
- Theology: Progressive Judaism
- Co-chair: Jean-Francois Bensahel
- Co-chair: Gad Weil
- Associations: World Union for Progressive Judaism
- Region: France
- Origin: 2019
- Merger of: Union Libérale Israélite de France, Liberal Jewish Movement of France
- Congregations: 8
- Members: 2000 families
- Official website: judaismeenmouvement.org

Judaism in Motion (French: Judaïsme en mouvement) (Abbeviation: JEM) is a Jewish denomination in France. Registered as a French religious association under the 1901 and 1905 French laws on religion, it was founded in 2019 from the merger of the Liberal Jewish Union of France (ULIF) and the Liberal Jewish Movement of France (MJLF).

== History ==
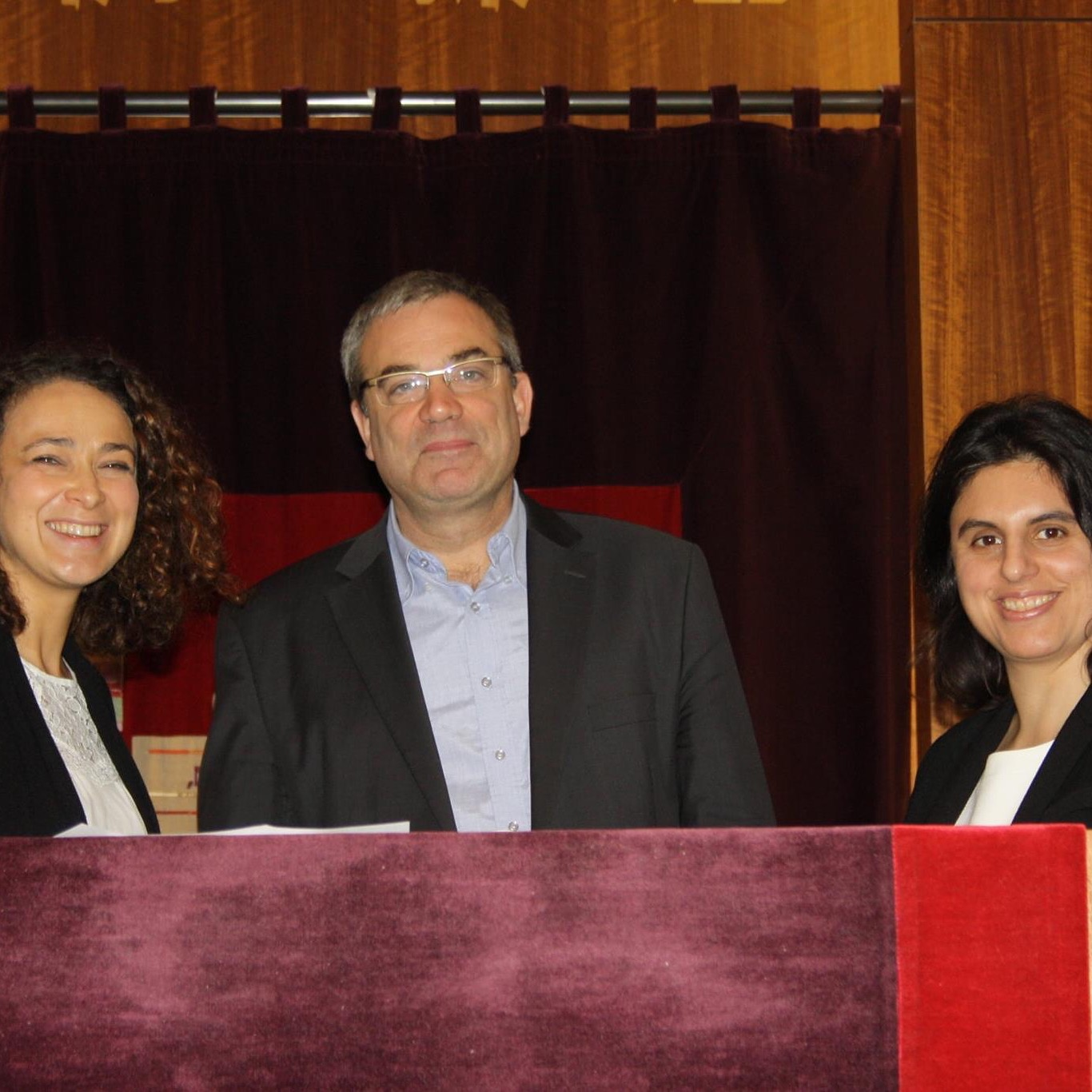
Rabbis Delphine Horvilleur, Yann Boissière and Floriane Chinsky in 2014.

The two movements have separate, but intertwined histories. The Union libérale israélite de France was founded 1907 with a synagogue at 24 Rue Copernic in Paris' 16th arrondissement. The Liberal Jewish Movement of France was founded in 1977, with a synagogue at 11 Rue Gaston-de-Caillavet in Paris' 15th arrondissement, and another location at 24 Rue du Surmelin in the 20th arrondissement in 1983..

== Beliefs ==
The goals of the movement are to "reunite men and women into an open, modern, egalitarian, welcoming and inclusive Judaism".. The new association aimed at combining the Reform/Liberal et Conservative/Masorti movements, and hoped to "deploy across France to allow the young, isolated Jews, interfaith couples, and everyone, to come together and reconnect with their Judaism". It also "wants to be the bearer of both Jewish traditions and republican values".

Judaïsme En Mouvement is co-chaired by Jean-François Bensahel and Gad Weil and hosted by Rabbis Yann Boissière, Floriane Chinsky, Gabriel Farhi, Philippe Haddad, Delphine Horvilleur, Jonas Jacquelin, and Josué Ferreira.

The charter of movement's rabbis provides for the use of French alongside Hebrew in services, and strict equality of men and women in community and cultural life. Judaïsme En Mouvement also has the desire to bring a modern Jewish voice within French Judaism, advocating for equality between men and women and to be very involved in Interfaith dialogue.

== Congregations ==
The following congregations are affiliated with Judaism in Motion:

- Beaugrenelle Synagogue, 15th arrondissement, Paris
- Rue Copernic Synagogue, 16th arrondissement, Paris
- ULIF Marseille, Marseille, France
- Rue de Surmelin, 20th arrondisement, Paris
- Rue Pelleport, 20th arrondisement, Paris
- AJL Toulouse, Toulouse, France
- UJL Strasbourg, Strasbourg, France
- Kehilat Kedem, Montpellier, France
