= Louis Germain Lévy =

French rabbi (1870–1946)

Rabbi Louis Germain Lévy
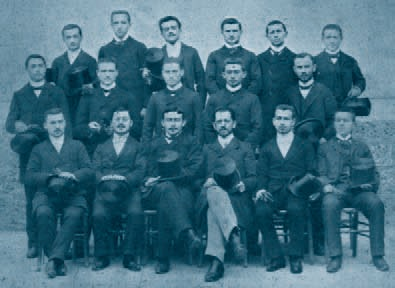
- Students of the Israelite Seminary in 1891. Louis Germain Levy is third from the left in the front row.
- Born: February 10, 1870; 10th arrondissement of Paris, France
- Died: December 15, 1946 (aged 76); 16th arrondissement of Paris, France
- Burial place: Montparnasse Cemetery
- Education: Israelite Seminary of France; The Sorbonne; Institut national des langues et civilisations orientales École pratique des hautes études
- Occupations: Rabbi, Military chaplain,
- Known for: First Rabbi of the Union libérale israélite de France

Louis Germain Lévy (February 10, 1870 – December 15, 1946) was a French rabbi and the founder of Union Libérale Israélite de France, the first Liberal synagogue in France.

== Biography ==
=== Family ===
Louis Germain Lévy was born in Paris on February 10, 1870, the son of Isaac Lévy, a merchant trader and Rosalie Lévy née Weill. He married Alice Jacob June 23, 1919, in Paris' Paris' 1st arrondissement.

=== Education ===
Lévy studied at École Halphen on rue Lafayette, the oldest Jewish school in France. He later attended the Talmud Torah of the Séminaire israélite de France before entering the seminary itself, becoming a rabbi in 1895. Rabbi Zadoc Kahn made him Levy his personal secretary. During his time in rabbinical school, his favorite subjects were about Maimonides and Second Temple Judaism. Levy obtained a Doctor of Letters from The Sorbonne on the family unit in ancient Israelite culture, with a secondary thesis on the metaphysics of Maimonides. Levy received a Diploma from the Institut national des langues et civilisations orientales in 1893 in Hebrew and from the École pratique des hautes études from the 5th section (religion) in 1893 and the 4th section (history and philology) in 1894.

Levy completed his military service by serving in the 28th Infantry Regiment, where he served from November 11, 1893, to November 1, 1894.

=== Great Synagogue of Paris ===
In 1895, Chief Rabbi of France Zadoc Kahn, concerned with the community abandoning religious practice, organized Sunday conferences at the Grand Synagogue of Paris for young people, with a liturgical component. Louis Germain Lévy gave presentations on work and workers in the Bible and Talmud, dignity and humanity in Judaism, and led the sunday morning services in the oratory of the Great Synagogue.

The Union libérale israélite (ULI) in August 1900, proposed creating:

[…] either in one of the Consistorial syangogues or in a private oratory, a true service with songs and preaching, on the day which is more propitious, and defend from wanting to transfer to Sunday the sacred character of Saturday.

=== Dijon ===
On July 22, 1901, Levy became Rabbi in Dijon and a military chaplain.

=== Founder of French Liberal Judaism ===
In February 1904, Louis Germain Lévy published a brochure entitled Une religion rationnelle et laïque [sic]. La religion du xxe siècle (A Rational and Secular Religion. The Religion of the 20th century). Inspired by Auguste Comte, Ernest Renan and Catholic modernism, he noted: Judaism, eminently, needs to adapt itself to contemporary thought; stripped of obsolete practices, institutions, and customs, of all dogmatic residue" to become a religion of the 20th century. He was inspired by Hyacinthe Loyson, an excommunicated priest.

=== Opposition ===
Considered an undesirable at the Grand Synagogue after the death of Zadoc Kahn in December 1905, and with the recent French law on the Separation of the Churches and the State the Union libérale israélite was founded, independent from the consistory of Paris.

The Paris Consistory argued to the Central Consistory that the reforms envisaged by the ULI were too "radical". However, the prefect authorized the change.

In March 1906, the magazine Archives israélites castigated "the singular pretention of the Union libérale" in which it only wanted to see a feminist inclination, because the Union "has as a patron ladies belonging to Paris high society", who can go astray by playing intellectuals.

The core directors published a letter with their objectives: except for the Shema and Kidusha, prayers would be recited in French, services would be shorter; preaching would become a central part of the service, Saturday services are supplemented with preaching on Sunday morning; religious instruction is given to children in a "modern spirit"; the bar-mitzvah would be a simple formality; conferences would be given on Jewish topics.

Clarisse Eugène Simon and Marguerite Brandon-Salvador, initiators of the project, stayed in the shadows while their male colleagues, Salvador Lévi, President, Alphonse Pereyra, vice-president, and Gaston Bach, secretary, signed the articles in the press.

In June 1906, Louis-Germain Lévy submitted a "reform motion" to the rabbinical congress, which was rejected.

In January 1907, Archives israélites described the scandal: "of having installed a modern-style worship service in a room belonging to the Consistory!" The Orthodox faithful at the Grand Synagogue pressured the new Chief Rabbi Alfred Lévy, who eventually gave in. The Liberals were told to leave.

=== Rue Copernic synagogue ===
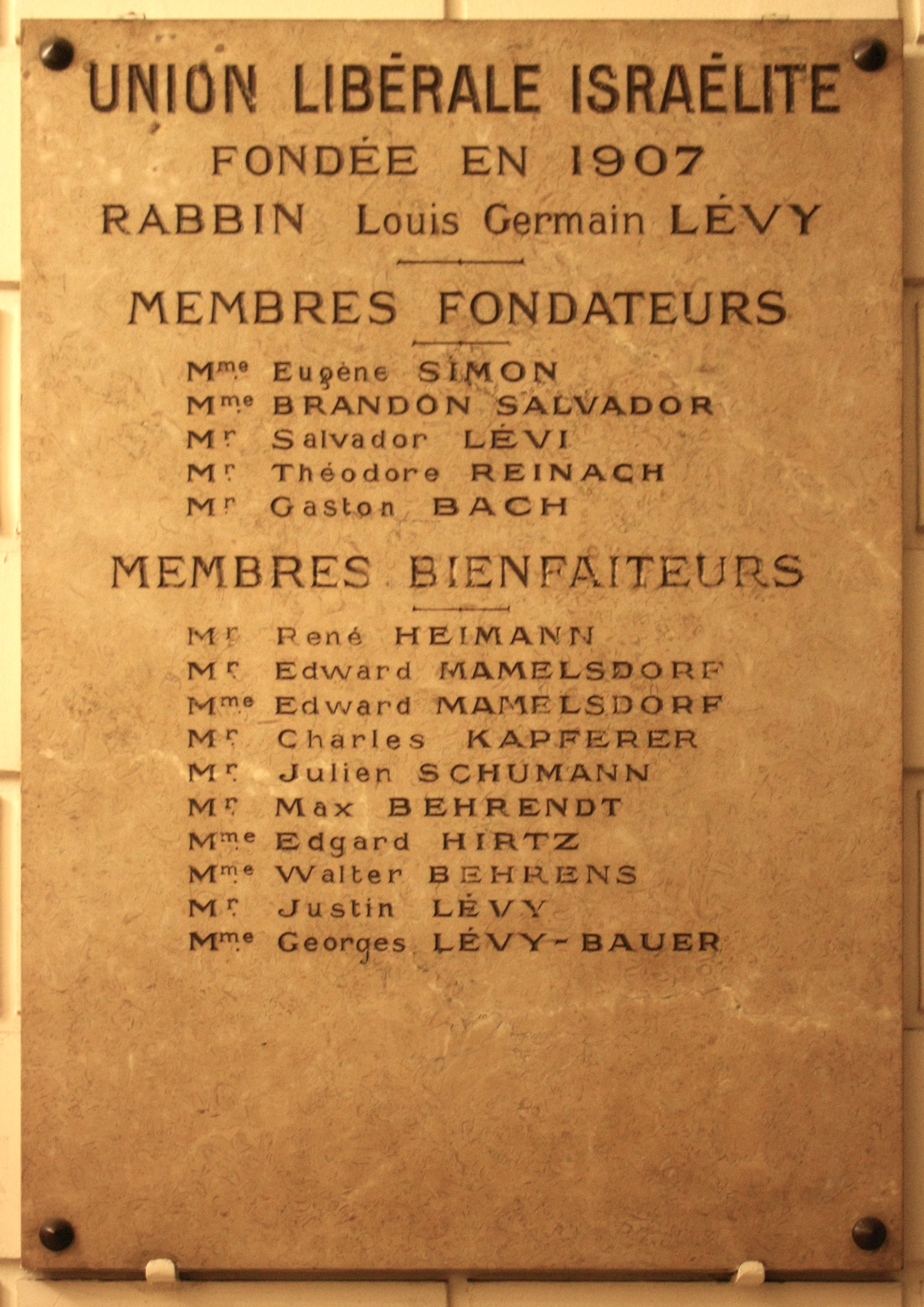
List of founders Union Libérale Israélite de France

In 1902, Lévy, supported by Alphonse Pereyra, opened an oratory out of his house at 17 rue Greuze. The community claimed to be "Sinaism or Reform Judaism", "a rite", and "a rejuvenation of our old cult".

The new community rented a building at 24 rue Copernic, and transformed the old painter's studio into a space able to welcome around 200 people.

Lévy became the rabbi and began living at the address. Marguerite Brandon-Salvador offered a harmonium.

The inaugural service was celebrated on December 1, 1907. Pastor Jules-Émile Roberty, who was present that night, noted the lack of knowledge among the congregation of the prayers, rituals and of Hebrew, especially when Lévy pronounced, in French, King Solomon's prayer for the dedication of the Temple in Jerusalem. The congregants, moved and astonished by the prayer, believed it to be a text written for the occasion.

A Protestant doctoral thesis described the synagogue:

The synagogue is decorated with Hebrew and French inscriptions. A platform serving as a pulpit is in the center, between two seven-branched candleholders. The rabbi put on a cassock, a lace cravat and a traditional tallit. He had his head uncovered like his assistants. The sexes were not separated. The essential prayers were spoken in Hebrew, others in French; the main worship has become, by circumstance, that of Sunday morning and is marked by a conference. The holidays are solemnized only one day instead of two; their worship passes hardly an hour.

Levy wanted to build "a Temple of the universal union with God", reconciling science and practice, tradition and modernity. Active in the global religious reform and ecumenism, he established the rites of the Union libérale israélite de France.

Shabbat services on Friday night at 6 pm and Saturday morning at 10:30 am were maintained. The Sunday services, accompanied by a sermon, were also attended by liberals from other religions, freemasons, esotericists, and theosophists.

One service, the first Sunday of the month, was devoted to the education of men. Until their bar mitzvah, they were given classes on Thursdays in Hebrew, Jewish history, Jewish literature and "Jewish doctrines". On Sunday, November 26, 1911, Levy invited Abdu'l-Baha, leader of the Baha'i Faith and promoter of a universal religion.

=== First World War ===
During the First World War, Levy served as a chaplain in the Grand Quartier Général.

Salvador Lévi replaced him as Rabbi during this time. As Sunday services gained in popularity, Salvador Lévi eliminated the Saturday services. When Lévy returned to his duties, he did not reinstate the Saturday services.

=== The Oratory and the Synagogue ===
In 1921, Lévy negotiated the acquisition of the building on behalf of the ULI.

He charged the architect Marcel Lemarié (1864–1941) to create the synagogue, inaugurated in 1924 for the High Holy Days.

Interfaith marriages were celebrated without reluctance. Reform after reform, suppression after suppression, ULI began accepting converts to Judaism without a circumcision, a scandalous policy.

=== An independent community ===
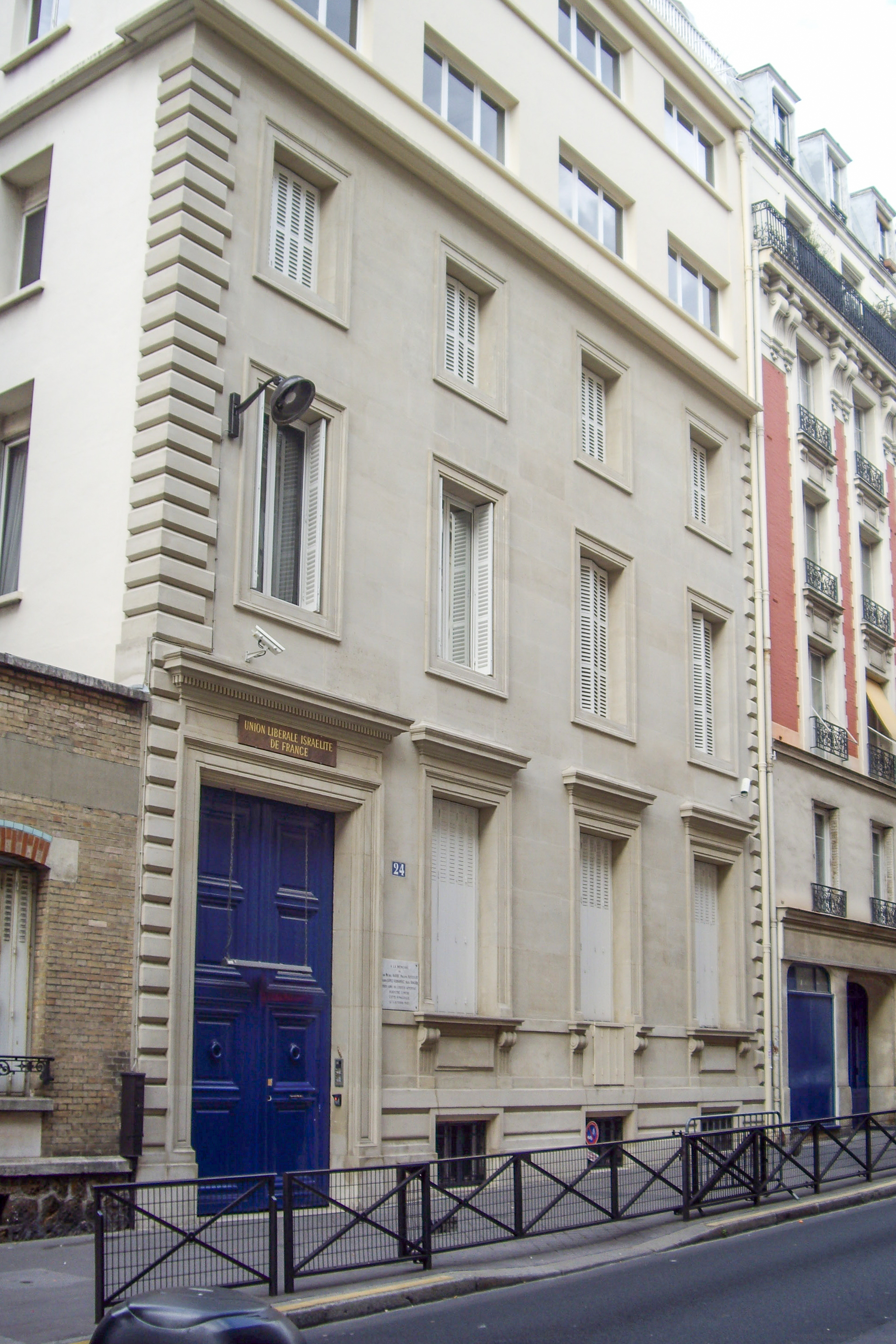
The Synagogue of the Union Libérale Israélite de France at Rue Copernic

On June 18, 1924, ULI had become a part of the Paris community, as a cultural association not administratively affiliated with the Consistory.

Shabbat services were newly celebrated, in Hebrew, on Saturday morning. Interfaith marriages were abolished, the Sunday morning service (without a Torah reading and with prayers in French) were maintained, and congregants covered their head if they wished, with the exception of the officiants; mixing of the sexes was optional. According to a 1937 correspondence with Maurice Liber et Julien Weill, Lévy wanted to continued to celebrating mixed marriages.

In 1921, he encouraged more observance of Shabbat with the Shabbat league. This also included attending services, reciting havdalah, the Hagomel prayer, prayers for the sick and those in mourning and the Priestly Blessing.

In 1924, Lévy created the Liberal Israelite Youth (Jeunesse libérale israélite), which publish a magazine called Le Petit Rayon. For the public, Levy organized conferences with Léo Baeck, Edmond Fleg,Gershon Sholem, Martin Buber, Julius Guttmann, Naftali Herz Tur-Sinai, Hanoch Albeck, Joachim Prinz, Siegfried Silberstein for courses on Hebrew, the history of Judaism, group studies, dances, outings, camps and vacations and created a library. He also encouraged young people to donate to the Jewish National Fund.

In June 1926, Levy developed a "religious initiation ceremony" for youth. Young people would sit in the front row, the rabbi would read the Amidah, followed by a public profession of faith. Each young person would come to the Bimah and recited a passage, passed in front of the Torah and then received the blessing from the Rabbi. The ceremony, meticulously regulated by Aimé Pallière, also included choirs, organs, and a prayer to France. In 1927 and 1928, a Passover Seder was held in a restaurant to initiate the youth. Levy also develop Zionist youth groups and scouting groups for the youth. The wolf pack group was created in 1931 before being renamed in 1932 to the Scouts of Liberal Israelite Youth (Éclaireurs de la Jeunesse libérale israélite). Youth were also involved in museum visits, sport activities and participated in meetings of the WUPJ.

=== Teaching ===
Lévy worked as a professor of History (1895–1905), Philosophy (1895–1940) and was the director of the Talmud Torah (1895–1940) at his alma mater École Halphen. In 1901, École Halphen became École Lucien-de-Hirsch. He served as a guest professor at the Hochschule für die Wissenschaft des Judentums where he taught Jewish literature (1905–1914 et 1919–1939), Homiletics (1905–1914 et 1919–1939), and history of the Jewish people (1919–1939). Levy was a guest professor at the Jewish Theological Seminary in Breslau and Hebrew Union College-Jewish Institute of Religion, where he taught Talmudic Judaism and Rabbinic Judaism, Jewish literature and history of the Jewish people. He applied, unsuccessfully, to be the chair of Jewish history and civilization position created by the Université de Paris in 1930. Levy was secretary of the editorial board for the Revue des Études Juives from 1907 to 1932 (except during his mobilization in World War I) and later served as its director from 1932 to 1940. He was secretary-general and later president of the Société des études juives and president of the Société Asiatique (1944–1946).

=== World Union for Progressive Judaism ===
In 1926, Lévy went to London for the founding of the World Union for Progressive Judaism (WUPJ), led by Claude Montefiore, Lily Montagu and Israel Mattuck. He became vice-president of the organization.

Lévy contributed to the establishment of Liberal Judaism in the United Kingdom. He approved of an idea of a "World Union of Progressive Jews" on October 12, 1925, and spoke at its opening ceremony on April 3, 1930. Proselytizing by the liberal movement was aimed at Jewish immigrants from Russia and Poland as well as pioneers in Palestine.:

New generations [...] do not want more orthodoxy but do not know the nature of Liberal Judaism and instead opt for irreligion.

=== Arnold Schoenberg ===
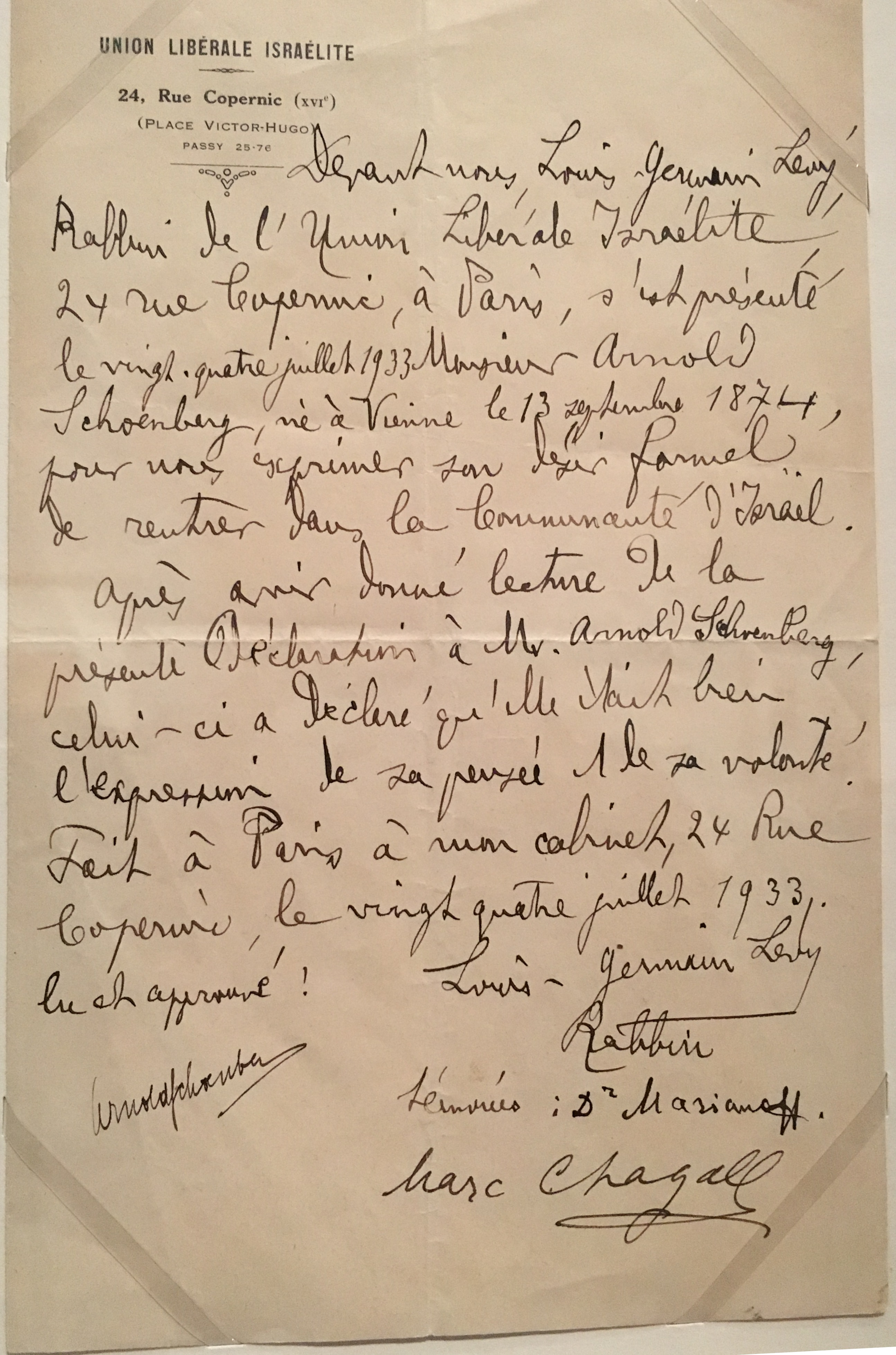
Document attesting to the return to Judaism of Arnold Schönberg in 1933, Marc Chagall was a witness

André Neher relates a story in his work Ils ont refait leur âme:

Before us Louis-Germain Lévy, Rabbi of the Union libérale israélite, 24 rue

Copernic, in Paris, was presented on July 24, 1933 M. Arnold Schoenberg, born in Vienna September 30, 1874, to express to us his formal desire to return to the Community of Israel. After having given the present Declaration to M. Arnold Schoenberg, the latter declared that this was an expression of his thoughts and his will.

Made in Paris in my office, 24 rue Copernic twenty-four July 1933, Read and approved: Rabbi Louis-Germain Lévy, Arnold Schoenberg

Witness: Dr Marianoff, Marc Chagall

Lévy explained that a Jew who converts to another religion remains Jewish, so it is not necessary for a ceremony to mark a return to Judaism.

=== Regina Jonas ===
On December 27, 1935, Regina Jonas was ordained by Rabbis Max Dienemann from the Association of Liberal Rabbis of Germany and Lévy in Offenbach-sur-le-Main.

=== World War II ===
In May 1940, a non-mobilized Rabbinical corps took refuge in Lyon. Lévy moved there with his wife, was charged by Chief Rabbi Maurice Liber with writing reports for the Central Consistory.

He returned to Paris, where he would learn of an order from September 23, 1940, prohibiting Jews who fled the Occupied Zone from returning. Levy stayed, despite that order.

Overnight between October 2 and 3, 1941, the synagogue was attacked. Levy escaped because he was staying with the community's insurer Jean Daniel Videau at 82 rue Lauriston. Videau became provisional administrator of the ULI on October 20, 1941, because the Rabbi and André Baur refused to afilliate with the Consistorial Association.

A decree of the Vichy Commissariat-General for Jewish Affairs called for the dissolution of Jewish organizations and transferred them to the Vichy-controlled Union générale des israélites de France.

André Baur asked Rabbi Lévy to help find safe homes and placement for Jewish intellectuals.

=== After the war ===
At the initiative of the Central Consistory, Lévy held services for Jewish Allied forces, as many members of the community had not yet returned.

The rabbi's house served as a meeting place for WIZO and an office for the Federation of Jewish Organizations of France. Additionally, professor Georges Vajda at the Séminaire israélite de France was living in the first floor of his apartment.

At the beginning of May 1945, Chief Rabbi of Paris Julien Weill suggested that the consistory absorb the ULI, arguing that the measure would have no difficulty with the merger as long as the language of worship remained French.

Lévy reached out to the WUPJ and Lily Montagu, to share the difficulties and his discouragement:

As far as I am concerned, I hold a service on Friday nights by myself, with no Chazzan and without music. Unfortunately, I do not have a Committee. As I wrote to you previously, President André Baur was killed in captivity, many of our members – and the most influential ones – have died. Our former treasurer is in the army. He gave all his papers to the deceased president, so I have not received a salary or pension since June 1940... I receive many visits, often young men returning from deportation, or who are passing through Paris, but are still mobilized. I visit congregants who I can reach. I also see quite a few people who need help.,

Lévy died at his home on December 15, 1946. He was buried in Montparnasse Cemetery.

André Zaoui succeeded him as the Rabbi for the Union Libérale Israélite de France.

== Bibliography ==
- Louis Germain Lévy, "Une religion rationnelle et laïque : la religion du XXe siècle", Paris, 75p., 1904
- Pauline Bebe, Le judaïsme libéral, éd. Jacques Grancher, 1993. ISBN 2-7339-0416-7
- Daniel Farhi et Pierre Haïat, Anthologie du Judaïsme Libéral – 70 textes fondamentaux, éd. Parole et Silence, 2007. ISBN 978-2-84573-586-6
- Dominique Jarassé, Guide du patrimoine juif parisien, Parigramme, 2003
- Jean-Claude Kuperminc et Jean-Philippe Chaumont (sous la dir.), Zadoc Kahn. Un grand-rabbin entre culture juive, affaire Dreyfus et laïcité, éditions de l'Éclat, 2007. ISBN 9782841621484
- Lucienne Portier, Christianisme, Églises et religions : le dossier Hyacinthe Loyson, 1827–1912. Contribution à l'histoire de l'Église de France et à l'histoire des religions, Louvain-la-Neuve, Centre d'histoire des religions, 1982
- Catherine Poujol Aimé Pallière (1868–1949). Un chrétien dans le judaïsme. Desclée de Brouwer, Paris, 2003. ISBN 2-220-05316-4
- (en) Daniel Langton, Claude Montefiore: His Life and Thought ISBN 0-85303-369-2 (London: Vallentine Mitchell Press, 2002)
- Maurice-Ruben Hayoun, Léo Baeck-Conscience du judaisme moderne , éd. Armand Colin, Paris.2011. ISBN 978-2-200-24861-1
- Ariane Bendavid; Stephen Berkowitz; Daniel Farhi; Laura Hobson-Faure; Colette Kessler; Rabbin David Meyer; Catherine Poujol; Perrine Simon-Nahum; Isabelle Williams (2007). L'Union Libérale Israélite de France 100 ans d'histoire (s). Paris: ULIF.
- Ariane Bendavid; Dominique Bourel; Béatrice Philippe; Perrine Simon-Nahum; Catherine Poujol; Stephen Berkowitz; Laura Hobson Faure; Pauline Bebe; Michael Williams (2007). Modernité d'une tradition 1907–2007 Cent ans d'histoire. Paris: Union libérale israélite de France. p. 152.
- Patrick Altar; Daniel Amson; Hélène Attali; Gérald Barbier; Michaël Bar Zvi; Ariane Bendavid; Frédéric Benichou; Armond Benhamou; Jean-François Bensahel (2007). Copernic Union Libérale Israélite de France. paris: Porte-Plume. p. 207. ISBN 978-2953134506.
