= Olivier Nora Éditions =

- Founded: 2026
- Founder: Olivier Nora
- Country of origin: France
- Headquarters location: Paris
- Distribution: Interforum
- Fiction genres: Literature

Olivier Nora Éditions is a French publishing house founded in 2026 by Olivier Nora.

== History ==
Following his ousting and subsequent dismissal from Éditions Grasset in April 2026, Olivier Nora announced—exclusively to Livres Hebdo—the founding of Olivier Nora Éditions on 17 August 2026.

The publishing house will officially launch in January 2027. However, two books Mémoires provisoires by Bernard-Henri Lévy and Sermons sous les décombres by Delphine Horvilleur will be released in October 2026, co-published with Jean-Luc Barré and the teams at Plon.
