= Reform Judaism =

Denomination of Judaism

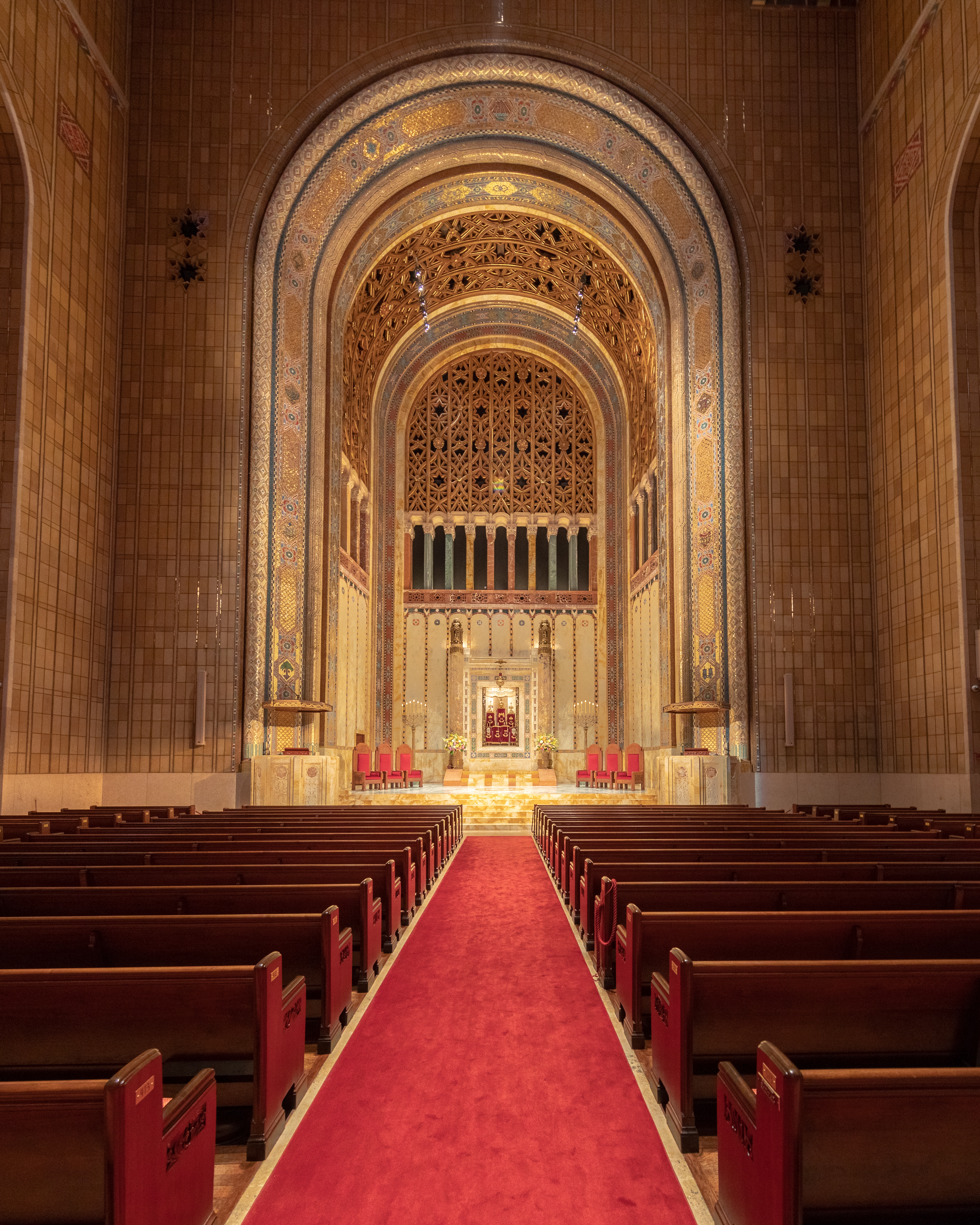
The interior of the Temple Emanu-El of New York, the largest Reform synagogue in the world.

Reform Judaism, also known as Liberal Judaism or Progressive Judaism, is a major Jewish denomination that emphasizes the evolving nature of Judaism, the superiority of its ethical aspects to its ceremonial ones, and belief in a continuous revelation that is closely intertwined with human reason and not limited to the theophany at Mount Sinai. A liberal strand of Judaism, it is characterized by little stress on ritual and personal observance, regarding Jewish law as non-binding and the individual Jew as autonomous, and by a great openness to external influences and progressive values.

The origins of Reform Judaism lie in mid-19th-century Germany, where Rabbi Abraham Geiger and his associates formulated its basic principles, attempting to harmonize Jewish tradition with modern sensibilities in the age of emancipation. Understanding Judaism in terms of the historical-critical method and modern philosophy, seeing it as constantly evolving, the early Reform movement sanctioned a conscious adaptation of religious life and the omission of observances and beliefs considered irrelevant or superstitious. In the public sphere it removed parts of the liturgy pertaining to concepts discarded by it, like bodily resurrection of the dead or the restoration of the sacrificial cult in Jerusalem, and translated much of the prayer from Hebrew to the vernacular German. In the private sphere it condoned and legitimized the widespread abandonment of personal observance of dietary, Sabbath, and other ritual laws.

European Reform was often conservative, having to co-exist with traditionalist elements within long-established communities. Brought to America by German-born rabbis, the denomination gained prominence in the United States, flourishing from the 1860s to the 1930s in an era known as "Classical Reform". In the American setting, Reform Judaism was free to exercise its ideas without restriction, adopting a universalist approach with little place for Jewish particularism and disposing of most traditional practice. Almost all of the liturgy was in English, converts and male babies were not required to undergo circumcision, and many congregations celebrated the Sabbath also on Sunday.

The arrival in America of numerous Eastern European Jewish immigrants, who were generally traditional, led to a renewed interest in observance and collective identity, officially enshrined by the 1937 Columbus platform. Since the 1970s, the movement has adopted a policy of inclusiveness and acceptance, inviting as many as possible to partake in its communities rather than adhering to strict theoretical clarity, becoming extremely diverse. It is strongly identified with progressive and liberal agendas in political and social terms, mainly under the traditional Jewish rubric tikkun olam ("repairing of the world"). Tikkun olam is a central motto of Reform Judaism, and acting in its name is one of the main channels for adherents to express their affiliation. The movement's most significant center is in North America.

Various regional branches exist, including the Union for Reform Judaism (URJ) in the United States and Canada, the Movement for Reform Judaism (MRJ) and Liberal Judaism in the United Kingdom, the Israel Movement for Reform and Progressive Judaism (IMPJ) in Israel, and the UJR-AmLat in Latin America; these are united within the international World Union for Progressive Judaism (WUPJ). Founded in 1926, the WUPJ estimates it represents at least 1.8 million people in 50 countries, about 1 million of whom are registered adult congregants, and the rest are unaffiliated but identify with the movement. This makes Reform the second-largest Jewish denomination worldwide, after Orthodox Judaism.

== Definitions ==
Its inherent pluralism and the importance it places on individual autonomy impedes any simplistic definition of Reform Judaism; its various strands regard Judaism throughout the ages as a religion that was derived from a process of constant evolution. They warrant and obligate further modifications and reject any fixed, permanent set of beliefs, laws or practices. A clear description of Reform Judaism became particularly challenging since the turn toward a policy that favored inclusiveness ("Big Tent" in the United States) over a coherent theology in the 1970s. This transition largely overlapped with what researchers termed the transition from "Classical" to "New" Reform Judaism in the United States, paralleled in the other, smaller branches of Reform across the world. The movement ceased stressing principles and core beliefs, focusing more on the personal spiritual experience and communal participation. This shift was not accompanied by a distinct new doctrine or by the abandonment of the former, but rather with ambiguity. The leadership allowed and encouraged a wide variety of positions, from selective adoption of halakhic observance to elements approaching religious humanism.

The declining importance of the theoretical foundation, in favour of pluralism and equivocalness, drew large crowds of newcomers. It also diversified Reform to a degree that made it hard to formulate a clear definition of it. Early and "Classical" Reform were characterized by a move away from traditional forms of Judaism combined with a coherent theology; "New Reform" sought, to a certain level, the reincorporation of many formerly discarded elements within the framework established during the "Classical" stage, though this very doctrinal basis became increasingly obfuscated.

Critics, like Rabbi Dana Evan Kaplan, warned that Reform became more of a Jewish activities club, a means to demonstrate some affinity to one's heritage in which even rabbinical students do not have to believe in any specific theology or engage in any particular practice, rather than a defined belief system.

== Theology ==
=== God ===
In regard to God, the Reform movement has always officially maintained a theistic stance, affirming the belief in a personal God. Despite this official position, some voices among the spiritual leadership have approached religious and even secular humanism. This tendency has grown since the mid-20th century among both clergy and constituents, leading to broader, dimmer definitions of the concept.

Early Reform thinkers in Germany clung to this precept; the 1885 Pittsburgh Platform described the "One God... The God-Idea as taught in our sacred Scripture" as consecrating the Jewish people to be its priests. It was grounded on a wholly theistic understanding, although the term "God-idea" was excoriated by outside critics. So was the 1937 Columbus Declaration of Principles, which spoke of "One, living God who rules the world". Even the 1976 San Francisco Centenary Perspective, drafted at a time of great discord among Reform theologians, upheld "the affirmation of God... Challenges of modern culture have made a steady belief difficult for some. Nevertheless, we ground our lives, personally and communally, on God's reality." The 1999 Pittsburgh Statement of Principles declared the "reality and oneness of God". British Liberal Judaism affirms the "Jewish conception of God: One and indivisible, transcendent and immanent, Creator and Sustainer".

=== Revelation ===
The basic tenet of Reform theology is a belief in a continuous, or progressive, revelation, occurring continuously and not limited to the theophany at Sinai, the defining event in traditional interpretation. According to this view, all holy scripture of Judaism, including the Torah, were authored by human beings who, although under divine inspiration, inserted their understanding and reflected the spirit of their consecutive ages. All the People of Israel are a further link in the chain of revelation, capable of reaching new insights: religion can be renewed without necessarily being dependent on past conventions. The chief promulgator of this concept was Abraham Geiger, generally considered the founder of the movement. After critical research led him to regard scripture as a human creation, bearing the marks of historical circumstances, he abandoned the belief in the unbroken perpetuity of tradition derived from Sinai and gradually replaced it with the idea of progressive revelation.

As in other liberal denominations, this notion offered a conceptual framework for reconciling the acceptance of critical research with the maintenance of a belief in some form of divine communication, thus preventing a rupture among those who could no longer accept a literal understanding of revelation. No less importantly, it provided the clergy with a rationale for adapting, changing and excising traditional mores and bypassing the accepted conventions of Jewish Law, rooted in the orthodox concept of the explicit transmission of both scripture and its oral interpretation. While also subject to change and new understanding, the basic premise of progressive revelation endures in Reform thought.

In its early days, this notion was greatly influenced by the philosophy of German idealism, from which its founders drew much inspiration: belief in humanity marching toward a full understanding of itself and the divine, manifested in moral progress towards perfection. This highly rationalistic view virtually identified human reason and intellect with divine action, leaving little room for direct influence by God. Geiger conceived revelation as occurring via the inherent "genius" of the People Israel, and his close ally Solomon Formstecher described it as the awakening of oneself into full consciousness of one's religious understanding. The American theologian Kaufmann Kohler also spoke of the "special insight" of Israel, almost fully independent from direct divine participation, and English thinker Claude Montefiore, founder of Liberal Judaism, reduced revelation to "inspiration", according intrinsic value only to the worth of its content, while "it is not the place where they are found that makes them inspired". Common to all these notions was the assertion that present generations have a higher and better understanding of divine will, and they can and should unwaveringly change and refashion religious precepts.

In the decades around World War II, this rationalistic and optimistic theology was challenged and questioned. It was gradually replaced, mainly by the Jewish existentialism of Martin Buber and Franz Rosenzweig, centered on a complex, personal relationship with the creator, and a more sober and disillusioned outlook. The identification of human reason with Godly inspiration was rejected in favour of views such as Rosenzweig's, who emphasized that the only content of revelation is it in itself, while all derivations of it are subjective, limited human understanding. However, while granting higher status to historical and traditional understanding, both insisted that "revelation is certainly not Law giving" and that it did not contain any "finished statements about God", but, rather, that human subjectivity shaped the unfathomable content of the Encounter and interpreted it under its own limitations. The senior representative of postwar Reform theology, Eugene Borowitz, regarded theophany in postmodern terms and closely linked it with quotidian human experience and interpersonal contact. He rejected the notion of "progressive revelation" in the meaning of comparing human betterment with divine inspiration, stressing that past experiences were "unique" and of everlasting importance. Yet he stated that his ideas by no means negated the concept of ongoing, individually experienced revelation by all.

=== Ritual, autonomy and law ===
Reform Judaism emphasizes the ethical facets of the faith as its central attribute, superseding the ceremonial ones. Reform thinkers often cited the Prophets' condemnations of ceremonial acts, lacking true intention and performed by the morally corrupt, as testimony that rites have no inherent quality. Geiger centered his philosophy on the Prophets' teachings (he had already named his ideology "Prophetic Judaism" in 1838), regarding morality and ethics as the stable core of a religion in which ritual observance transformed radically through the ages. However, practices were seen as a means to elation and a link to the heritage of the past, and Reform generally argued that rituals should be maintained, discarded or modified based on whether they served these higher purposes. This stance allowed a great variety of practice both in the past and the present. In "Classical" times, personal observance was reduced to little beyond nothing. The postwar "New Reform" lent renewed importance to practical, regular action as a means to engage congregants, abandoning the sanitized forms of the "Classical".

Another key aspect of Reform doctrine is the personal autonomy of each adherent, who may formulate their own understanding and expression of their religiosity. Reform is unique among all Jewish denominations in placing the individual as the authorized interpreter of Judaism. This position was originally influenced by Kantian philosophy and the great weight it lent to personal judgement and free will. This highly individualistic stance also proved one of the movement's great challenges, for it impeded the creation of clear guidelines and standards for positive participation in religious life and definition of what was expected from members.

The notion of autonomy coincided with the gradual abandonment of traditional practice (largely neglected by most members, and the Jewish public in general, before and during the rise of Reform) in the early stages of the movement. It was a major characteristic during the "Classical" period, when Reform closely resembled Protestant surroundings. Later, it was applied to encourage adherents to seek their own means of engaging Judaism. "New Reform" embraced the criticism levied by Rosenzweig and other thinkers at extreme individualism, laying a greater stress on community and tradition. Though by no means declaring that members were bound by a compelling authority of some sort – the notion of an intervening, commanding God remained foreign to denominational thought. The "New Reform" approach to the question is characterized by an attempt to strike a mean between autonomy and some degree of conformity, focusing on a dialectic relationship between both.

The movement never entirely abandoned halachic (traditional jurisprudence) argumentation, both due to the need for precedent to counter external accusations and the continuity of heritage. Instead, the movement had largely made ethical considerations or the spirit of the age the decisive factor in determining its course. The German founding fathers undermined the principles behind the legalistic process, which was based on a belief in an unbroken tradition through the ages merely elaborated and applied to novel circumstances, rather than subject to change. Rabbi Samuel Holdheim advocated a particularly radical stance, arguing that the halachic Law of the Land is Law principle must be universally applied and subject virtually everything to current norms and needs, far beyond its weight in conventional Jewish Law.

While Reform rabbis in 19th-century Germany had to accommodate conservative elements in their communities, at the height of "Classical Reform" in the United States, halakhic considerations could be virtually ignored and Holdheim's approach embraced. In the 1930s and onwards, Rabbi Solomon Freehof and his supporters reintroduced such elements, but they too regarded Jewish Law as too rigid a system. Instead, they recommended that selected features will be readopted and new observances established in a piecemeal fashion, as spontaneous minhag (custom) emerging by trial and error and becoming widespread if it appealed to the masses. The advocates of this approach also stress that their responsa are of non-binding nature, and their recipients may adapt them as they see fit. Freehof's successors, such as Rabbis Walter Jacob and Moshe Zemer, further elaborated the notion of "Progressive Halakha" along the same lines.

=== Messianic age and election ===
Reform sought to accentuate and greatly augment the universalist traits in Judaism, turning it into a faith befitting the Enlightenment ideals ubiquitous at the time it emerged. The tension between universalism and the imperative to maintain uniqueness characterized the movement throughout its entire history. Its earliest proponents rejected Deism and the belief that all religions would unite into one, and it later faced the challenges of the Ethical movement and Unitarianism. Parallel to that, it sought to diminish all components of Judaism that it regarded as overly particularist and self-centered: petitions expressing hostility towards gentiles were toned down or excised, and practices were often streamlined to resemble surrounding society. "New Reform" laid a renewed stress on Jewish particular identity, regarding it as better suiting popular sentiment and need for preservation.

One major expression of that, which is the first clear Reform doctrine to have been formulated, is the idea of universal Messianism. The belief in redemption was unhinged from the traditional elements of return to Zion and restoration of the Temple and the sacrificial cult therein, and turned into a general hope for salvation. This was later refined when the notion of a personal Messiah who would reign over Israel was officially abolished and replaced by the concept of a Messianic Age of universal harmony and perfection. The considerable loss of faith in human progress around World War II greatly shook this ideal, but it endures as a precept of Reform.

Another key example is the reinterpretation of the election of Israel. The movement maintained the idea of the Chosen People of God, but recast it in a more universal fashion: it isolated and accentuated the notion (already present in traditional sources) that the mission of Israel was to spread among all nations and teach them divinely-inspired ethical monotheism, bringing them all closer to the Creator. One extreme "Classical" promulgator of this approach, Rabbi David Einhorn, substituted the lamentation on the Ninth of Av for a celebration, regarding the destruction of Jerusalem as fulfilling God's scheme to bring his word, via his people, to all corners of the earth. Highly self-centered affirmations of Jewish exceptionalism were moderated, although the general notion of "a kingdom of priests and a holy nation" retained. On the other hand, while embracing a less strict interpretation compared to the traditional one, Reform also held to this tenet against those who sought to deny it. When secularist thinkers like Ahad Ha'am and Mordecai Kaplan forwarded the view of Judaism as a civilization, portraying it as a culture created by the Jewish people, rather than a God-given faith defining them, Reform theologians decidedly rejected their position – although it became popular and even dominant among rank-and-file members. Like the Orthodox, they insisted that the People Israel was created by divine election alone, and existed solely as such. The 1999 Pittsburgh Platform and other official statements affirmed that the "Jewish people is bound to God by an eternal b'rit, covenant".

=== Soul and afterlife ===
As part of its philosophy, Reform Judaism anchored reason in divine influence, accepted scientific criticism of hallowed texts and sought to adapt Judaism to modern notions of rationalism. Judaism was viewed by Enlightenment thinkers both as irrational and an import from ancient middle-eastern pagans. The only perceived form of retribution for the wicked, if any, was the anguish of their soul after death, and vice versa, bliss was the single accolade for the spirits of the righteous. Angels and heavenly hosts were also deemed a foreign superstitious influence, especially from early Zoroastrian sources, and denied. Notions of afterlife according to Enlightenment thinkers were given to be reduced merely to the immortality of the soul, while the founding thinkers of Reform Judaism, like Montefiore, all shared this belief, the existence of a soul became harder to cling to with the passing of time. In the 1980s, Borowitz could state that the movement had nothing coherent to declare in the matter. The various streams of Reform still largely, though not always or strictly, uphold the idea. The 1999 Pittsburgh Statement of Principles, for example, used the somewhat ambiguous formula "the spirit within us is eternal".

== Practice ==
=== Liturgy ===
The first and primary field in which Reform convictions were expressed was that of prayer forms. From its beginning, Reform Judaism attempted to harmonize the language of petitions with modern sensibilities and what the constituents actually believed in. Jakob Josef Petuchowski, in his extensive survey of Progressive liturgy, listed several key principles that defined it through the years and many transformations it underwent. The prayers were abridged, whether by omitting repetitions, excising passages or reintroducing the ancient triennial cycle for reading the Torah; vernacular segments were added alongside or instead of the Hebrew and Aramaic text, to ensure the congregants understood the petitions they expressed; and some new prayers were composed to reflect the spirit of changing times. But chiefly, liturgists sought to reformulate the prayerbooks and have them express the movement's theology. Blessings and passages referring to the coming of the Messiah, return to Zion, renewal of sacrificial practices, resurrection of the dead, reward and punishment and overt particularism of the People Israel were replaced, recast or excised altogether.

In its early stages, when Reform Judaism was more a tendency within unified communities in Central Europe than an independent movement, its advocates had to practice considerable moderation, lest they provoke conservative animosity. German prayerbooks often relegated the more contentious issues to the vernacular translation, treating the original text with great care and sometimes having problematic passages in small print and untranslated. When institutionalized and free of such constraints, it was able to pursue a more radical course. In American "Classical" or British Liberal prayerbooks, a far larger vernacular component was added and liturgy was drastically shortened, and petitions in discord with denominational theology eliminated.

"New Reform", both in the United States and in Britain and the rest of the world, is characterized by larger affinity to traditional forms and diminished emphasis on harmonizing them with prevalent beliefs. Concurrently, it is also more inclusive and accommodating, even towards beliefs that are officially rejected by Reform theologians, sometimes allowing alternative differing rites for each congregation to choose from. Thus, prayerbooks from the mid–20th century onwards incorporated more Hebrew, and restored such elements as blessing on phylacteries. More profound changes included restoration of the Gevorot benediction in the 2007 Mishkan T'filah, with the optional "give life to all/revive the dead" formula. The CCAR stated this passage did not reflect a belief in Resurrection, but Jewish heritage. On the other extreme, the 1975 Gates of Prayer substituted "the Eternal One" for "God" in the English translation (though not in the original), a measure that was condemned by several Reform rabbis as a step toward religious humanism.

=== Observance ===
During its formative era, Reform was oriented toward lesser ceremonial obligations. In 1846, the Breslau rabbinical conference abolished the second day of festivals; during the same years, the Berlin Reform congregation held prayers without blowing the Ram's Horn, phylacteries, mantles or head covering, and held its Sabbath services on Sunday. In the late 19th and early 20th century, American "Classical Reform" often emulated Berlin on a mass scale, with many communities conducting prayers along the same style and having additional services on Sunday. An official rescheduling of Sabbath to Sunday was advocated by Kaufmann Kohler for some time, though he retracted it eventually. Religious divorce was declared redundant and the civil one recognized as sufficient by American Reform in 1869, and in Germany by 1912; the laws concerning dietary and personal purity, the priestly prerogatives, marital ordinances and so forth were dispensed with, and openly revoked by the 1885 Pittsburgh Platform, which declared all ceremonial acts binding only if they served to enhance religious experience. From 1890, converts were no longer obligated to be circumcised. Similar policy was pursued by Claude Montefiore's Jewish Religious Union, established at Britain in 1902. The Vereinigung für das Liberale Judentum in Germany, which was more moderate, declared virtually all personal observance voluntary in its 1912 guidelines.

"New Reform" saw the establishment and membership lay greater emphasis on the ceremonial aspects, after the former sterile and minimalist approach was condemned as offering little to engage in religion and encouraging apathy. Numerous rituals became popular again, often after being recast or reinterpreted, though as a matter of personal choice for the individual and not an authoritative obligation. Circumcision or Letting of Blood for converts and newborn babies became virtually mandated in the 1980s; ablution for menstruating women gained great grassroots popularity at the turn of the century, and some synagogues built mikvehs (ritual baths). A renewed interest in dietary laws (though by no means in the strict sense) also surfaced at the same decades, as were phylacteries, prayer shawls and head coverings. Reform is still characterized by having the least service attendance on average: for example, of those polled by Pew in 2013, only 34% of registered synagogue members (and only 17% of all those who state affinity) attend services once a month and more.

The Proto-Reform movement did pioneer new rituals. In the 1810s and 1820s, the circles (Israel Jacobson, Eduard Kley and others) that gave rise to the movement introduced confirmation ceremonies for boys and girls, in emulation of parallel Christian initiation rite. These soon spread outside the movement, though many of a more traditional leaning rejected the name "confirmation". In the "New Reform", Bar Mitzvah largely replaced it as part of the re-traditionalization, but many young congregants in the United States still perform one, often at Shavuot. Confirmation for girls eventually developed into the Bat Mitzvah, now popular among all except strictly Orthodox Jews.

Some branches of Reform, while subscribing to its differentiation between ritual and ethics, chose to maintain a considerable degree of practical observance, especially in areas where a conservative Jewish majority had to be accommodated. Most Liberal communities in Germany maintained dietary standards and the like in the public sphere, both due to the moderation of their congregants and threats of Orthodox secession. A similar pattern characterizes the Movement for Reform Judaism in Britain, which attempted to appeal to newcomers from the United Synagogue, or to the Israel Movement for Reform and Progressive Judaism (IMPJ) in Israel.

=== Openness ===
Its philosophy of continuous revelation made Progressive Judaism, in all its variants, much more able to embrace change and new trends than any of the other major denominations.

Reform Judaism is considered to be the first major Jewish denomination to adopt gender equality in religious life. As early as 1846, the Breslau conference announced that women must enjoy identical obligations and prerogatives in worship and communal affairs, though this decision had virtually no effect in practice. Lily Montagu, who served as a driving force behind British Liberal Judaism and WUPJ, was the first woman in recorded history to deliver a sermon at a synagogue in 1918, and set another precedent when she conducted a prayer two years later. Regina Jonas, ordained in 1935 by later chairman of the Vereinigung der liberalen Rabbiner Max Dienemann, was the earliest known female rabbi to officially be granted the title. In 1972, Sally Priesand was ordained by Hebrew Union College, which made her the first female rabbi of the US ordained by a rabbinical seminary, and the second formally ordained female rabbi in Jewish history, after Regina Jonas. Reform also pioneered family seating, an arrangement that spread throughout American Jewry but was only applied in continental Europe after World War II. Egalitarianism in prayer became universally prevalent in the WUPJ by the end of the 20th century.

Religious inclusion for LGBT people and ordination of LGBT rabbis were also pioneered by the movement. Intercourse between consenting adults was declared as legitimate by the Central Conference of American Rabbis (CCAR) in 1977, Hebrew Union College - Jewish Institute of Religion accepted its first open LGBTQ students in 1990 (Leslie Bergson, Stephen Roberts and Burt Schuman) and the CCAR openly gay clergy were admitted in 1990. Same-sex marriage was sanctioned by the year 2000. In 2015, the URJ adopted a Resolution on the Rights of Transgender and Gender Non-Conforming People, urging clergy and synagogue attendants to actively promote tolerance and inclusion of such individuals.

American Reform, especially, turned action for social and progressive causes into an important part of religious commitment. From the second half of the 20th century, it employed the old rabbinic notion of Tikkun Olam, "repairing the world", as a slogan under which constituents were encouraged to partake in various initiatives for the betterment of society. The Religious Action Center of Reform Judaism became an important lobby in service of progressive causes such as the rights of minorities. Tikkun Olam has become the central venue for active participation for many affiliates, even leading critics to negatively describe Reform as little more than a means employed by Jewish liberals to claim that commitment to their political convictions was also a religious activity and demonstrates fealty to Judaism. Dana Evan Kaplan stated that "Tikkun Olam has incorporated only leftist, socialist-like elements. In truth, it is political, basically a mirror of the most radically leftist components of the Democratic Party platform, causing many to say that Reform Judaism is simply 'the Democratic Party with Jewish holidays'." In Israel, the Religious Action Center is very active in the judicial field, often using litigation both in cases concerning civil rights in general and the official status of Reform Judaism within the state, in particular.

=== Jewish identity ===
While opposed to interfaith marriage in principle, officials of the major Reform rabbinical organisation, the Central Conference of American Rabbis (CCAR), estimated in 2012 that about half of their rabbis partake in such ceremonies. The need to cope with this phenomenon – 80% of all Reform-raised Jews in the United States wed between 2000 and 2013 were intermarried – led to the recognition of patrilineal descent: all children born to a couple in which a single member was Jewish, whether mother or father, was accepted as a Jew on condition that they received corresponding education and committed themselves as such. Conversely, offspring of a Jewish mother only are not accepted if they do not demonstrate affinity to the faith. A Jewish status is conferred unconditionally only on the children of two Jewish parents.

This decision was taken by the British Liberal Judaism in the 1950s. The North American Union for Reform Judaism (URJ) accepted it in 1983, and the British Movement for Reform Judaism affirmed it in 2015. The various strands also adopted a policy of embracing the intermarried and their spouses. British Liberals offer "blessing ceremonies" if the child is to be raised Jewish, and the MRJ allows its clergy to participate in celebration of civil marriage, though none allow a full Jewish ceremony with chupah and the like. In American Reform, 17% of synagogue-member households have a converted spouse, and 26% an unconverted one. Its policy on conversion and Jewish status led the WUPJ into conflict with more traditional circles, and a growing number of its adherents are not accepted as Jewish by either the Conservative or the Orthodox. Outside North America and Britain, patrilineal descent was not accepted by most. As in other fields, small WUPJ affiliates are less independent and often have to deal with more conservative Jewish denominations in their countries, such as vis-à-vis the Orthodox rabbinate in Israel or continental Europe.

=== Conversion ===
Conversion within Reform Judaism has been seen as controversial by the Orthodox and Masorti sects. Due to the Reform movement's progressive views on what it means to be a Jew, the conversion process has been criticized and often unrecognized by more conservative sects, yet conversions through the Reform movement are legally recognized by the Israeli government and thus entitled to citizenship under the Law of Return.

Converts through Reform Judaism are accepted based on their sincerity, regardless of their background or previous beliefs. Studying with a rabbi is the norm and can take anywhere from several months to several years. The process focuses on participation in congregational activities and observation of holidays and Halakha. Conversions are finalized with a meeting of the Beit Din and usually a Brit Milah and a Tevilah, though the extent to which the practice of Brit Milah is observed varies from country to country. Furthermore, the acceptance of Reform converts by other sects is rare, with many Orthodox and Masorti temples rejecting Reform Converts.

== Organization and demographics ==
The term "Reform" was first applied institutionally – not generically, as in "for reform" – to the Berlin Reformgemeinde (Reform Congregation), established in 1845. Apart from it, most German communities that were oriented in that direction preferred the more ambiguous "Liberal", which was not exclusively associated with Reform Judaism. It was more prevalent as an appellation for the religiously apathetic majority among German Jews, and also to all rabbis who were not clearly Orthodox (including the rival Positive-Historical School). The title "Reform" became much more common in the United States, where an independent denomination under this name was fully identified with the religious tendency. However, Isaac Meyer Wise suggested in 1871 that "Progressive Judaism" was a better epithet. When the movement was institutionalized in Germany between 1898 and 1908, its leaders chose "Liberal" as self-designation, founding the Vereinigung für das Liberale Judentum. In 1902, Claude Montefiore termed the doctrine espoused by his new Jewish Religious Union as "Liberal Judaism", too, though it belonged to the more radical part of the spectrum in relation to the German one.

In 1926, British Liberals, American Reform and German Liberals consolidated their worldwide movement – united in affirming tenets such as progressive revelation, supremacy of ethics above ritual and so forth – at a meeting held in London. Originally carrying the provisional title "International Conference of Liberal Jews", after deliberations between "Liberal", "Reform" and "Modern", it was named World Union for Progressive Judaism on 12 July, at the conclusion of a vote. The WUPJ established further branches around the planet, alternatively under the names "Reform", "Liberal" and "Progressive". In 1945, the Associated British Synagogues (later Movement for Reform Judaism) joined as well. In 1990, Reconstructionist Judaism entered the WUPJ as an observer. Espousing another religious worldview, it became the only non-Reform member. The WUPJ claims to represent a total of at least 1.8 million people – these figures do not take into account the 2013 PEW survey, and rely on the older URJ estimate of a total of 1.5 million presumed to have affinity, since updated to 2.2 million – both registered synagogue members and non-affiliates who identify with it.

Worldwide, the movement is mainly centered in North America. The largest WUPJ constituent by far is the Union for Reform Judaism (until 2003: Union of American Hebrew Congregations) in the United States and Canada. As of 2013, a Pew Research Center survey calculated it represented about 35% of all 5.3 million Jewish adults in the U.S., making it the single most numerous Jewish religious group in the country. Steven M. Cohen deduced there were 756,000 adult Jewish synagogue members – about a quarter of households had an unconverted spouse (according to 2001 findings), adding some 90,000 non-Jews and making the total constituency roughly 850,000 – and further 1,154,000 "Reform-identified non-members" in the United States. There are also 30,000 in Canada. Based on these, the URJ claims to represent 2.2 million people. It has 814 congregations in the U.S. and 27 in Canada, the vast majority of the 1,170 affiliated with the WUPJ that are not Reconstructionist. Its rabbinical arm is the Central Conference of American Rabbis, with some 2,300 member rabbis, mainly trained in Hebrew Union College. As of 2015, the URJ was led by President Rabbi Richard Jacobs, and the CCAR headed by Rabbi Denise Eger.

The next in size, by a wide margin, are the two British WUPJ-affiliates. In 2010, the Movement for Reform Judaism and Liberal Judaism respectively had 16,125 and 7,197 member households in 45 and 39 communities, or 19.4% and 8.7% of British Jews registered at a synagogue. Other member organizations are based in forty countries around the world. They include the Union progressiver Juden in Deutschland, which had some 4,500 members in 2010 and incorporates 25 congregations, one in Austria; the Nederlands Verbond voor Progressief Jodendom, with 3,500 affiliates in 10 communities; the 13 Liberal synagogues in France; the Israel Movement for Reform and Progressive Judaism (5,000 members in 2000, 35 communities); the Movement for Progressive Judaism (Движение прогрессивного Иудаизма) in the CIS and Baltic States, with 61 affiliates in Russia, Ukraine and Belarus and several thousands of regular constituents; and many other, smaller ones.

== History ==
=== Beginnings ===
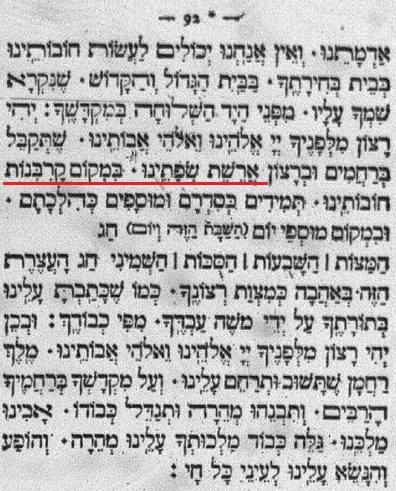
A segment of the 1818 Hamburg prayer book. Stating "accept the uttering of our lips instead of our obligatory sacrifices" and omitting the traditional "O gather our dispersions... Conduct us unto Zion" passage.

With the advent of Jewish emancipation and acculturation in Central Europe during the late 18th century, and the breakdown of traditional Jewish life, the proper response to the changed circumstances became a heated concern. Radical, second-generation Berlin maskilim (Enlightened), like Lazarus Bendavid and David Friedländer, proposed to reduce Judaism to little above Deism, or allow it to dissipate entirely. A more palatable course was the reform of worship in synagogues, making them more attractive to a generation whose aesthetic and moral taste became attuned to that of Christian surroundings. The first considered to have implemented such a course was the Amsterdam Ashkenazi congregation, "Adath Jessurun", In 1796. Emulating the local Sephardic custom, it omitted the "Father of Mercy" prayer, beseeching God to take revenge upon the gentiles. The short-lived community employed fully traditional ("orthodox") argumentation to legitimize its actions, but is often regarded a harbinger by historians.

A program of reforms was introduced by Israel Jacobson, a philanthropist and "community organizer" from the Kingdom of Westphalia. Many of the reforms he pioneered, like a regular vernacular sermon on moralistic themes, would be later adopted by the modernist Orthodox. On 17 July 1810, he held what is considered the first Reform Jewish service in a school chapel in Seesen that employed an organ and a choir during prayer and borrowed some Protestant chorales.While Jacobson was far from full-fledged Reform Judaism, this day was adopted by the movement worldwide as its foundation date. The Seesen temple – a designation quite common for prayerhouses at the time; "temple" would later become, somewhat misleadingly (and not exclusively), identified with Reform institutions via association with the elimination of prayers for the Jerusalem Temple – closed in 1813. Jacobson moved to Berlin and established a similar synagogue, which became a hub for like-minded intellectuals, interested in the betterment of religious experience. Though the prayerbook used in Berlin did introduce several deviations from the received text, it did so without an organizing principle. In 1818, Jacobson's acquaintance Edward Kley founded the Hamburg Temple. Here, changes in the rite were eclectic no more and had severe dogmatic implications: prayers for the restoration of sacrifices by the Messiah and Return to Zion were quite systematically omitted. The Hamburg edition is considered the first comprehensive Reform liturgy.

While Orthodox protests to Jacobson's initiatives had been scant, dozens of rabbis throughout Europe united to ban the Hamburg Temple. The Hamburg reformers, still attempting to play within the limits of rabbinic tradition, cited canonical sources in defence of their actions; they had the grudging support of one liberal-minded rabbi, Aaron Chorin of Arad, though even he never acceded to the removal of prayers for the sacrifices.

The massive Orthodox reaction halted the advance of early Reform, confining it to the port city for the next twenty years. As acculturation and resulting religious apathy spread, many synagogues introduced mild aesthetic changes, such as vernacular sermons or somber conduct, yet these were carefully crafted to assuage conservative elements (though the staunchly Orthodox opposed them anyhow; secular education for rabbis, for example, was much resisted). One of the first to adopt such modifications was Hamburg's own Orthodox community, under the newly appointed modern Rabbi Isaac Bernays. The less strict but still traditional Isaac Noah Mannheimer of the Vienna Stadttempel and Michael Sachs in Prague, set the pace for most of Central and Western Europe. They significantly altered custom, but wholly avoided dogmatic issues or overt injury to Jewish Law.

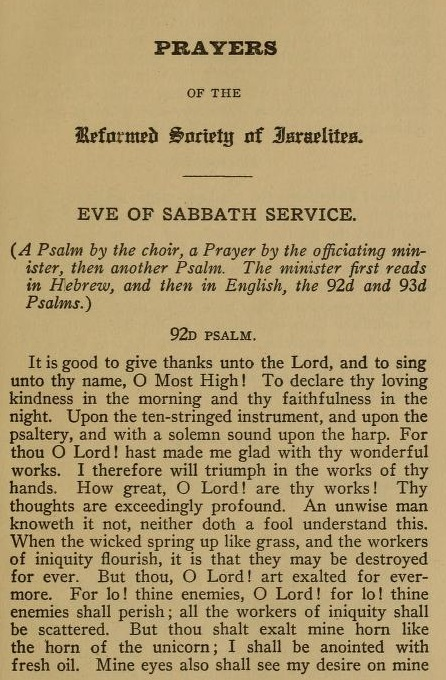
A passage from the Reformed Society's prayerbook, which was mostly in English and theologically more radical than Hamburg's.

An isolated, yet much more radical step in the same direction as Hamburg's, was taken across the ocean in 1824. The younger congregants in the Charleston synagogue "Beth Elohim" were disgruntled by present conditions and demanded change. Led by Isaac Harby and other associates, they formed their own prayer group, "The Reformed Society of Israelites". Apart from strictly aesthetic matters, like having sermons and synagogue affairs delivered in English, rather than Middle Spanish (as was customary among Western Sephardim), they had almost their entire liturgy solely in the vernacular, in a far greater proportion compared to the Hamburg rite. And chiefly, they felt little attachment to the traditional Messianic doctrine and possessed a clearly heterodox religious understanding. In their new prayerbook, authors Harby, Abram Moïse and David Nunes Carvalho unequivocally excised pleas for the restoration of the Jerusalem Temple; during his inaugural address on 21 November 1825, Harby stated their native country was their only Zion, not "some stony desert", and described the rabbis of old as "Fabulists and Sophists... Who tortured the plainest precepts of the Law into monstrous and unexpected inferences". The Society was short-lived, and they merged back into Beth Elohim in 1833. As in Germany, the reformers were laymen, operating in a country with little rabbinic presence.

=== Consolidation in German lands ===
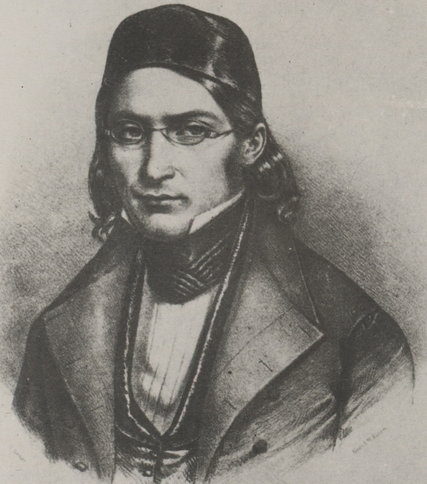
Rabbi Abraham Geiger, circa 1840.

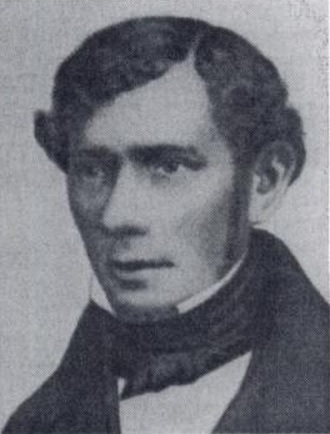
Rabbi Samuel Holdheim, circa 1850.

In the 1820s and 1830s, philosophers like Solomon Steinheim imported German idealism into the Jewish religious discourse, attempting to draw from the means it employed to reconcile Christian faith and modern sensibilities. But it was the new scholarly, critical Science of Judaism (Wissenschaft des Judentums) that became the focus of controversy. Its proponents vacillated whether and to what degree it should be applied against the contemporary plight. Opinions ranged from the strictly Orthodox Azriel Hildesheimer, who subjugated research to the predetermined sanctity of the texts and refused to allow it practical implication over received methods; via the Positive-Historical Zecharias Frankel, who did not deny Wissenschaft a role, but only in deference to tradition, and opposed analysis of the Pentateuch; and up to Abraham Geiger, who rejected any limitations on objective research or its application. He is considered the founding father of Reform Judaism.

Geiger wrote that at seventeen already, he discerned that the late Tannaim and the Amoraim imposed a subjective interpretation on the Oral Torah, attempting to diffuse its revolutionary potential by linking it to the biblical text. Believing that Judaism became stale and had to be radically transformed if it were to survive modernity, he found little use in the legal procedures of halakha, arguing that hardline rabbis often demonstrated they will not accept major innovations anyway. His venture into higher criticism led him to regard the Pentateuch as reflecting power struggles between the Pharisees on one hand, and the Saducees who had their own pre-Mishnaic halakha. Having concluded the belief in an unbroken tradition back to Sinai or a divinely dictated Torah could not be maintained, he began to articulate a theology of progressive revelation, presenting the Pharisees as reformers who revolutionized the Saducee-dominated religion. His other model were the Prophets, whose morals and ethics were to him the only true, permanent core of Judaism. He was not alone: Solomon Formstecher argued that Revelation was God's influence on human psyche, rather than encapsulated in law; Aaron Bernstein was apparently the first to deny inherent sanctity to any text when he wrote in 1844 that, "The Pentateuch is not a chronicle of God's revelation, it is a testimony to the inspiration His consciousness had on our forebears." Many others shared similar convictions.

In 1837, Geiger hosted a conference of like-minded young rabbis in Wiesbaden. He told the assembled that the "Talmud must go". In 1841, the Hamburg Temple issued a second edition of its prayerbook, the first Reform liturgy since its predecessor of 1818. Orthodox response was weak and quickly defeated. Most rabbinic posts in Germany were now manned by university graduates susceptible to rationalistic ideas, which also permeated liberal Protestantism led by such figures as Leberecht Uhlich. They formed the backbone of the nascent Reform rabbinate. Geiger intervened in the Second Hamburg Temple controversy not just to defend the prayerbook against the Orthodox, but also to denounce it, stating the time of mainly aesthetic and unsystematic reforms has passed. In 1842, the power of progressive forces was revealed again: when Geiger's superior Rabbi Solomon Tiktin attempted to dismiss him from the post of preacher in Breslau, 15 of 17 rabbis consulted by the board stated his unorthodox views were congruous with his post. He himself differentiated between his principled stance and quotidian conduct. Believing it could be implemented only carefully, he was moderate in practice and remained personally observant.

Second only to Geiger, Rabbi Samuel Holdheim distinguished himself as a radical proponent of change. While the former stressed continuity with the past and described Judaism as an entity that gradually adopted and discarded elements along time, Holdheim accorded present conditions the highest status, sharply dividing the universalist core from all other aspects that could be unremittingly disposed of. Declaring that old laws lost their hold on Jews as it were and the rabbi could only act as a guide for voluntary observance, his principle was that the concept of "the Law of the Land is the Law" was total. He declared mixed marriage permissible – almost the only Reform rabbi to do so in history; his contemporaries and later generations opposed this – for the Talmudic ban on conducting them on Sabbath, unlike offering sacrifice and other acts, was to him sufficient demonstration that they belonged not to the category of sanctified obligations (issurim) but to the civil ones (memonot), where the Law of the Land applied. Another measure he offered, rejected almost unanimously by his colleagues in 1846, was the institution of a "Second Sabbath" on Sunday, modeled on Second Passover, as most people desecrated the day of rest.

The pressures of the late Vormärz era were intensifying. In 1842, a group of radical laymen determined to achieve full acceptance into society was founded in Frankfurt, the "Friends of Reform". They abolished circumcision and declared that the Talmud was no longer binding. In response to pleas from Frankfurt, virtually all rabbis in Germany, even Holdheim, declared circumcision obligatory. Similar groups sprang in Breslau and Berlin. These developments, and the need to bring uniformity to practical reforms implemented piecemeal in the various communities, motivated Geiger and his like-minded supporters into action. Between 1844 and 1846, they convened three rabbinical assemblies, in Braunschweig, Frankfurt am Main and Breslau respectively. Those were intended to implement the proposals of Aaron Chorin and others for a new Sanhedrin, made already in 1826, that could assess and eliminate various ancient decrees and prohibitions. A total of forty-two people attended the three meetings, including moderates and conservatives, all quite young, usually in their thirties.

The conferences made few concrete far-reaching steps, albeit they generally stated that the old mechanisms of religious interpretation were obsolete. The first, held on 12–19 June 1844, abolished Kol Nidrei and the humiliating Jewish oath, still administered by rabbis, and established a committee to determine "to which degree the Messianic ideal should be mentioned in prayer". Repeating the response of the 1806 Paris Grand Sanhedrin to Napoleon, it declared intermarriage permissible as long as children could be raised Jewish; this measure effectively banned such unions without offending Christians, as no state in Germany allowed mixed-faith couples to have non-Christians education for offspring. It enraged critics anyhow. A small group of traditionalists also attended, losing all votes. On the opposite wing were sympathizers of Holdheim, who declared on 17 June that "science already demonstrated that the Talmud has no authority either from the dogmatic or practical perspective... The men of the Great Assembly had jurisdiction only for their time. We possess the same power, when we express the spirit of ours." The majority was led by Geiger and Ludwig Philippson and was keen on moderation and historical continuity.

The harsh response from the strictly Orthodox came as no surprise. Moshe Schick declared "they have blasphemed against the Divinity of the Law, they are no Israelites and equal to Gentiles". Yet they also managed to antagonize more moderate progressives. Both S. L. Rapoport and Zecharias Frankel strongly condemned Braunschweig. Another discontented party were Christian missionaries, who feared Reform on two accounts: it could stem the massive tide of conversions, and loosen Jewish piety in favor of liberal, semi-secularized religion that they opposed among Christians as well, reducing the possibility they would ever accept new dogma fully.

Frankel was convinced to attend the next conference, held in Frankfurt on 15–28 July 1845, after many pleas. But he walked out after it passed a resolution that there were subjective, but no objective, arguments for retaining Hebrew in the liturgy. While this was quite a trivial statement, well grounded in canonical sources, Frankel regarded it as a deliberate breach with tradition and irreverence toward the collective Jewish sentiment. The 1840s, commented Meyer, saw the crystallization of Reform, narrowing from reformers (in the generic sense) who wished to modernize Judaism to some degree or other (including both Frankel and the Neo-Orthodox Samson Raphael Hirsch) a broad stream that embraced all opponents of the premodern status quo... to a more clearly marked current which rejected not only the religious mentality of the ghetto, but also the modernist Orthodoxy which altered form but not substance. After his withdrawal, the conference adopted another key doctrine that Frankel opposed, and officially enshrined the idea of a future Messianic era rather than a personal redeemer. Rabbi David Einhorn elucidated a further notion, that of the Mission to bring ethical monotheism to all people, commenting that, "Exile was once perceived as a disaster, but it was progress. Israel approached its true destiny, with sanctity replacing blood sacrifice. It was to spread the Word of the Lord to the four corners of the earth."

The last meeting, convened in Breslau (13–24 July 1846), was the most innocuous. The Sabbath, widely desecrated by the majority of German Jews, was discussed. Participants argued whether leniencies for civil servants should be enacted but could not agree and released a general statement about its sanctity. Holdheim shocked the assembled when he proposed his "Second Sabbath" scheme, astonishing even the radical wing, and his motion was rejected offhand. They did vote to eliminate the Second Day of Festivals, noting it was both an irrelevant rabbinic ordinance and scarcely observed anyway.

While eliciting protest from the Orthodox, Frankfurt and Breslau also incensed the radical laity, which regarded them as too acquiescent. In March 1845, a small group formed a semi-independent congregation in Berlin, the Reformgemeinde. They invited Holdheim to serve as their rabbi, though he was often at odds with the board led by Sigismund Stern. They instituted a drastically abridged prayerbook in German and allowed the abolition of most ritual aspects.

Practice and liturgy were modified in numerous German congregations. Until the conferences, the only Reform prayerbooks ever printed in Europe were the two Hamburg editions. In the 1850s and 1860s, dozens of new prayerbooks which omitted or rephrased the cardinal theological segments of temple sacrifice, ingathering of exiles, Messiah, resurrection and angels – rather than merely abbreviating the service; excising non-essential parts, especially piyyutim, was common among moderate Orthodox and conservatives too – were authored in Germany for mass usage, demonstrating the prevalence of the new religious ideology. And yet, Geiger and most of the conferences' participants were far more moderate than Holdheim. While he administered in a homogeneous group, they had to serve in unified communities, in which traditionalists held separate services but still had to be respected. Changes were decidedly restrained. Liturgists were often careful when introducing their changes into the Hebrew text of prayers, less than with the German translation, and some level of traditional observance was maintained in public. Except Berlin, where the term "Reform" was first used as an adjective, the rest referred to themselves as "Liberal".

Two further rabbinical conferences much later, in 1869 and 1871 at Leipzig and Augsburg respectively, were marked with a cautious tone. Their only outcome was the bypassing of the Loosening of the Shoe ceremony via a prenuptial agreement and the establishment of the Hochschule für die Wissenschaft des Judentums, though officially non-denominational, as a rabbinical seminary. While common, noted Michael Meyer, the designation "Liberal Jew" was more associated with political persuasion than religious conviction. The general Jewish public in Germany demonstrated little interest, especially after the 1876 law under which communal affiliation and paying parish taxes were no longer mandatory.

Outside Germany, Reform had little to no influence in the rest of the continent. Radical lay societies sprang in Hungary during the 1848 Revolution but soon dispersed. Only in Germany, commented Steven M. Lowenstein, did the extinction of old Jewish community life led to the creation of a new, positive religious ideology that advocated principled change. In Western and Central Europe, personal observance disappeared, but the public was not interested in bridging the gap between themselves and the official faith. Secular education for clergy became mandated by mid-century, and yeshivas all closed due to lack of applicants, replaced by modern seminaries; the new academically trained rabbinate, whether affirming basically traditional doctrines or liberal and influenced by Wissenschaft, was scarcely prone to anything beyond aesthetic modifications and de facto tolerance of the laity's apathy. Further to the east, among the unemancipated and unacculturated Jewish masses in Poland, Romania and Russia, the stimulants that gave rise either to Reform or modernist Orthodoxy were scarce. The few rich and westernized Jews in cities like Odessa or Warsaw constructed modern synagogues where mild aesthetic reforms, like vernacular sermons or holding the wedding canopy indoors, rather than under the sky, were introduced. Regarded as boldly innovative in their environs, these were long since considered trivial even by the most Orthodox in Germany, Bohemia or Moravia. In the east, the belated breakdown of old mores led not to the remodification of religion, but to the formulation of secular conceptions of Jewishness, especially nationalistic ones.

In 1840, several British Jews formed the West London Synagogue of British Jews, headed by Reverend David Woolf Marks. While the title "Reform" was occasionally applied to them, their approach was described as "neo-Karaite" and was utterly opposite to continental developments. Only a century later did they and other synagogues embrace mainland ideas and established the British Movement for Reform Judaism.

=== The US and Classical Reform ===
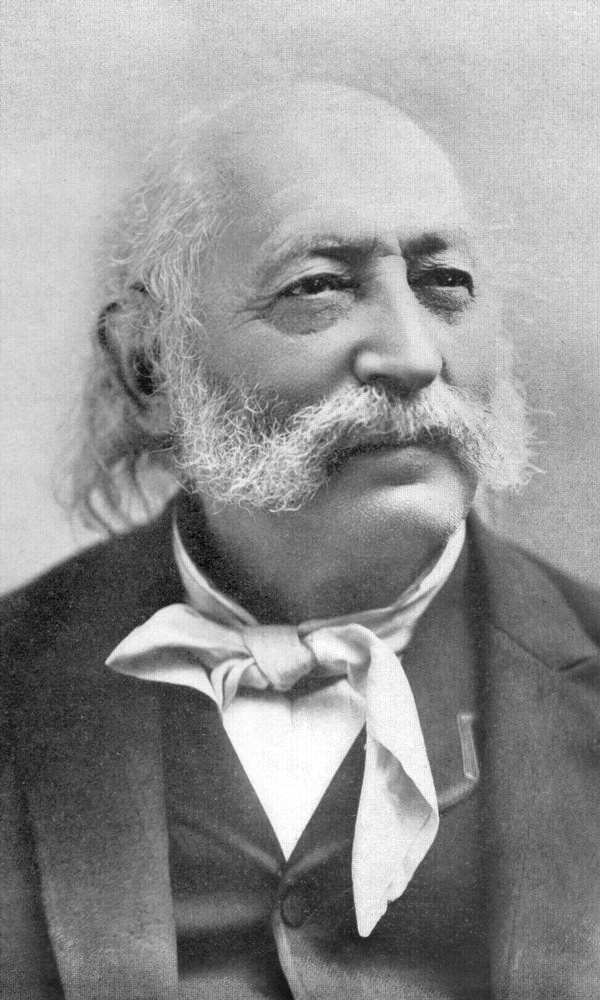
Isaac Meyer Wise.

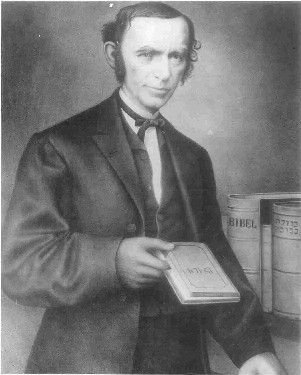
Rabbi David Einhorn.

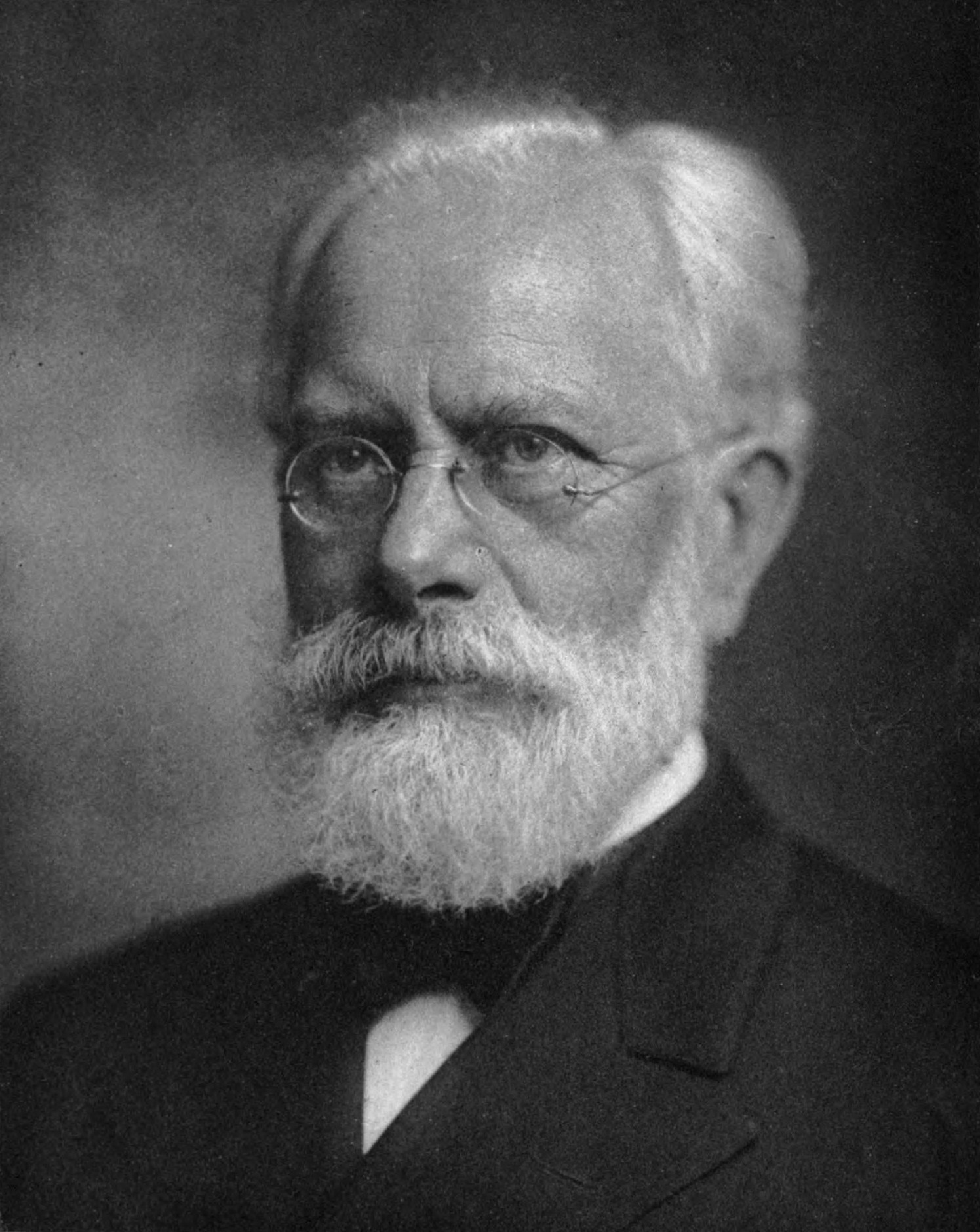
Rabbi Kaufmann Kohler.

At Charleston, the former members of the Reformed Society gained influence over the affairs of Beth Elohim. In 1836, Gustavus Poznanski was appointed minister. At first traditional, but around 1841, he excised the Resurrection of the Dead and abolished the Second day of festivals, five years before the same was done at the Breslau conference.

Apart from that, the American Reform movement was chiefly a direct German import. In 1842, Har Sinai Congregation was founded by German-Jewish immigrants in Baltimore. Adopting the Hamburg rite, it was the first synagogue established as Reformed on the continent. In the new land, there were neither old state-mandated communal structures, nor strong conservative elements among the newcomers. While the first generation was still somewhat traditional, their Americanized children were keen on a new religious expression. Reform quickly spread even before the Civil War. While fueled by the condition of immigrant communities, in matters of doctrine, wrote Michael Meyer, "However much a response to its particular social context, the basic principles are those put forth by Geiger and the other German Reformers – progressive revelation, historical-critical approach, the centrality of the Prophetic literature."

The rabbinate was almost exclusively transplanted – Rabbis Samuel Hirsch, Samuel Adler, Gustav Gottheil, Kaufmann Kohler, and others all played a role both in Germany and across the ocean – and led by two individuals: the radical Rabbi David Einhorn, who participated in the 1844–1846 conferences and was very much influenced by Holdheim (though utterly rejecting mixed marriage), and the moderate pragmatist Isaac Meyer Wise, who while sharing deeply heterodox views was more an organizer than a thinker. Wise was distinct from the others, arriving early in 1846 and lacking much formal education. He was of little ideological consistency, often willing to compromise.

Quite haphazardly, Wise instituted a major innovation when introducing family pews in 1851, after his Albany congregation purchased a local church building and retained sitting arrangements. While it was gradually adopted even by many Orthodox Jews in the US, and remained so well into the 20th century, the same was not applied in Germany until after World War II. Wise attempted to reach consensus with the traditionalist leader Rabbi Isaac Leeser in order to forge a single, unified, American Judaism. In the 1855 Cleveland Synod, he was at first acquiescent to Leeser, but reverted immediately after the other departed. The enraged Leeser disavowed any connection with him. Yet Wise's harshest critic was Einhorn, who arrived from Europe in the same year. Demanding clear positions, he headed the radical camp as Reform turned into a distinct current.

On 3–6 November 1869, the two and their followers met in Philadelphia. Described by Meyer as American Reform's "declaration of independence", they stated their commitment to the principles already formulated in Germany: priestly privileges, the belief in Resurrection, and a personal Messiah were denied. A practical, far-reaching measure, not instituted in the home country until 1910, was acceptance of civil marriage and divorce. A get was no longer required. In 1873, Wise founded the Union of American Hebrew Congregations (since 2003, Union for Reform Judaism), the denominational body. In 1875, he established the movement's rabbinical seminary, Hebrew Union College, at Cincinnati, Ohio. He and Einhorn also quarreled in the matter of liturgy, each issuing his own prayerbook, Minhag America (American Rite) and Olat Tamid (Regular Burnt Offering) respectively, which they hoped to make standard issue. Eventually, the Union Prayer Book was adopted in 1895. The movement spread rapidly: in 1860, when it began its ascent, there were few Reform synagogues and 200 Orthodox in the United States. By 1880, a mere handful of the existing 275 were not affiliated with it.

The proponents of Reform or progressive forms of Judaism had consistently claimed since the early nineteenth-century that they sought to reconcile Jewish religion with the best of contemporary scientific thought. The science of evolution was arguably the scientific idea that drew the most sustained interest. A good example is the series of twelve sermons published as The Cosmic God (1876) by Isaac Meyer Wise, who offered an alternative theistic account of transmutation to that of Darwinism, which he dismissed as 'homo-brutalism'. Other Reform rabbis who were more sympathetic to Darwinian conceptions of evolution were Kaufmann Kohler, Emil G. Hirsch, and Joseph Krauskopf. These engaged with high-profile sceptics and atheists such as Robert Ingersoll and Felix Adler as well as with proponents of biological evolutionary theory, with the result that a distinctly panentheistic character of US Reform Jewish theology was observable.

In 1885, Reform Judaism in America was confronted by challenges from both flanks. To the left, Felix Adler and his Ethical Movement rejected the need for the Jews to exist as a differentiated group. On the right, the recently arrived Rabbi Alexander Kohut, an adherent of Zecharias Frankel, lambasted it for having abandoned traditional Judaism. Einhorn's son-in-law and chief ideologue, Rabbi Kaufmann Kohler, invited leading rabbis to formulate a response. The eight clauses of the Pittsburgh Platform were proclaimed on 19 November. It added virtually nothing new to the tenets of Reform, but rather elucidated them, declaring unambiguously that: "Today, we accept as binding only the moral laws, and maintain only such ceremonies as elevate and sanctify our lives." The platform was never officially ratified by either the UAHC or HUC, and many of their members even attempted to disassociate from it, fearing that its radical tone would deter potential allies. It indeed motivated a handful of conservatives to cease any cooperation with the movement and withdraw their constituencies from the UAHC. Those joined Kohut and Sabato Morais in establishing the Jewish Theological Seminary of America. It united all non-Reform currents in the country and would gradually develop into the locus of Conservative Judaism.

The Pittsburgh Platform is considered a defining document of the sanitized and rationalistic "Classical Reform", dominant from the 1860s to the 1930s. At its height, some forty congregations adopted the Sunday Sabbath and UAHC communities had services without most traditional elements, in a manner seen in Europe only at the Berlin Reformgemeinde. In 1889, Wise founded the Central Conference of American Rabbis (CCAR), the denominational rabbinic council.

However, change loomed on the horizon. From 1881 to 1924, over 2,400,000 immigrants from Eastern Europe drastically altered American Jewry, increasing it tenfold. The 40,000 members of Reform congregations became a small minority overnight. The newcomers arrived from backward regions, where modern education was scarce and civil equality nonexistent, retaining a strong sense of Jewish ethnicity. Even the ideological secularists among them, all the more so the common masses which merely turned lax or nonobservant, had a very traditional understanding of worship and religious conduct. The leading intellectuals of Eastern European Jewish nationalism castigated western Jews in general, and Reform Judaism in particular, not on theological grounds which they as laicists wholly rejected, but for what they claimed to be assimilationist tendencies and the undermining of peoplehood. This sentiment also fueled the often cool manner in which the denomination is perceived in Israeli society, originally established on the basis of these ideologies.

While at first alienated from all native modernized Jews, a fortiori the Reform ones, the Eastern Europeans did slowly integrate. Growing numbers did begin to enter UAHC prayerhouses. The CCAR soon readopted elements long discarded in order to appeal to them: In the 1910s, inexperienced rabbis in the East Coast were given ram horns fitted with a trumpet mouthpiece, seventy years after the Reformgemeinde first held High Holiday prayers without blowing the instrument. The five-day workweek soon made the Sunday Sabbath redundant. Temples in the South and the Midwest, where the new crowd was scant, remained largely Classical.

=== The World Union ===
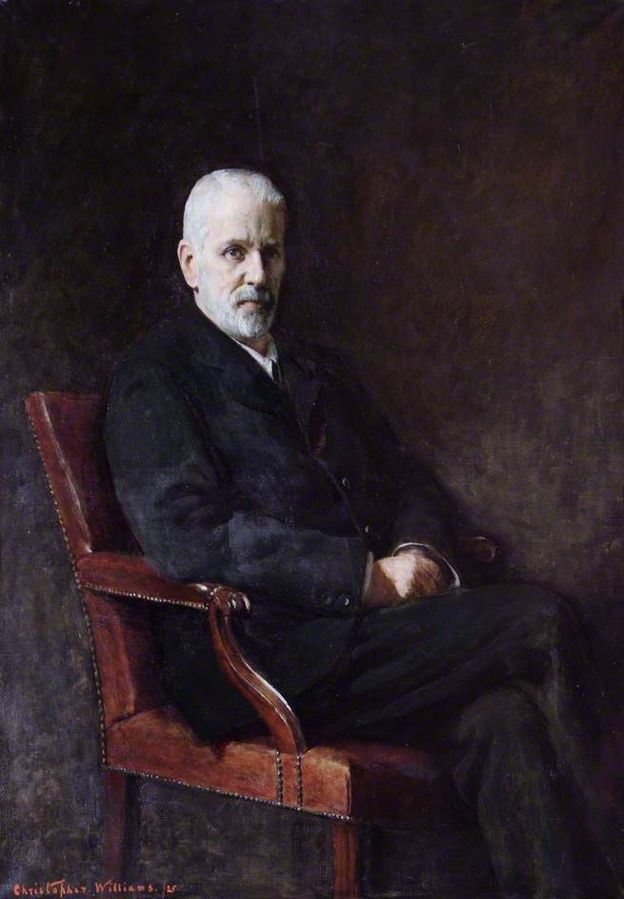
Claude Montefiore.

In Germany, Liberal communities stagnated since mid-century. Full and complete Jewish emancipation granted to all in the German Empire in 1871 largely diffused interest in harmonizing religion with Zeitgeist. Immigration from Eastern Europe also strengthened traditional elements. In 1898, seeking to counter these trends, Rabbi Heinemann Vogelstein established the Union of Liberal Rabbis (Vereinigung der liberalen Rabbiner). It numbered 37 members at first and grew to include 72 by 1914, about half of Germany's Jewish clergy, a proportion maintained until 1933. In 1908, Vogelstein and Rabbi Cäsar Seligmann also founded a congregational arm, the Union for Liberal Judaism in Germany (Vereinigung für das Liberale Judentum in Deutschland), finally institutionalizing the current that until then was active as a loose tendency. The Union had some 10,000 registered members in the 1920s. In 1912, Seligmann drafted a declaration of principles, "Guiding Lines towards a Program for Liberal Judaism" (Richtlinien zu einem Programm für das liberale Judentum). It stressed the importance of individual consciousness and the supremacy of ethical values to ritual practice, declared a belief in a messianic age and was adopted as "a recommendation", rather than a binding decision.

In 1902, Claude Montefiore and several friends, including Lily Montagu and Israel Abrahams, founded the Jewish Religious Union (JRU) in London. It served as the cornerstone of Liberal Judaism in Britain. Montefiore was greatly influenced by the ideas of early German Reformers. He and his associates were mainly driven by the example and challenge of Unitarianism, which offered upper-class Jews a universal, enlightened belief. Meyer noted that while he had original strains, Montefiore was largely dependent on Geiger and his concepts of progressive revelation, instrumentality of ritual et cetera. His Liberal Judaism was radical and puristic, matching and sometimes exceeding the Berlin and American variants. They sharply abridged liturgy and largely discarded practice. Langton has argued for the distinctly Anglo-Jewish character of the movement, which was dominated by Montefiore's idiosyncratic ideas. In 1907, the former Consistorial rabbi Louis Germain Lévy who shared a similar worldview, formed the Union Libérale Israélite de France, a small congregation that numbered barely a hundred families. It eventually evolved into the Liberal Jewish Movement of France.

Seligmann first suggested the creation of an international organization. On 10 July 1926, representatives from around the world gathered in London. Rabbi Jacob K. Shankman wrote they were all "animated by the convictions of Reform Judaism: emphasized the Prophets' teachings as the cardinal element, progressive revelation, willingness to adapt ancient forms to contemporary needs". The conference was attended by representatives of the German Liberal Union, the British JRU, the American UAHC and CCAR, and Lévy from France. After weighing their options, they chose "Progressive", rather than either "Liberal" or "Reform", as their name, founding the World Union for Progressive Judaism. It began to sponsor new chapters globally. The first was founded in the Netherlands, where two synagogues formed the Verbond voor Liberaal-Religieuze Joden in Nederland on 18 October 1931.

Already in 1930, the West London Synagogue affiliated with WUPJ. In the coming decade, waves of refugees from Nazi Germany arrived in Britain, bringing with them both the moderation of German Liberal Judaism (few mingled with the radical JRU) and a cadre of trained rabbis. Only then did British Reform emerge as a movement. 1942 saw the founding of the Associated British Synagogues, which joined the WUPJ in 1945. Preserving the relative traditionalism of Germany, they later adopted the name "Reform Synagogues of Great Britain" (since 2005, Movement for Reform Judaism), distinct from the smaller "Union of Liberal and Progressive Synagogues", which succeeded the JRU. Tens of thousands of refugees from Germany brought their Liberal Judaism to other lands as well. In 1930, the first Liberal congregation, Temple Beth Israel Melbourne, was founded in Australia. In June 1931, the South African Jewish Religious Union for Liberal Judaism was organised, soon employing HUC-ordained Moses Cyrus Weiler. The Congregação Israelita Paulista of São Paulo, first branch in South America, was established in 1936. German refugees also founded a Liberal community named Emet ve-Emuna in Jerusalem, but it joined the Conservatives by 1949.

=== The New Reform Judaism ===
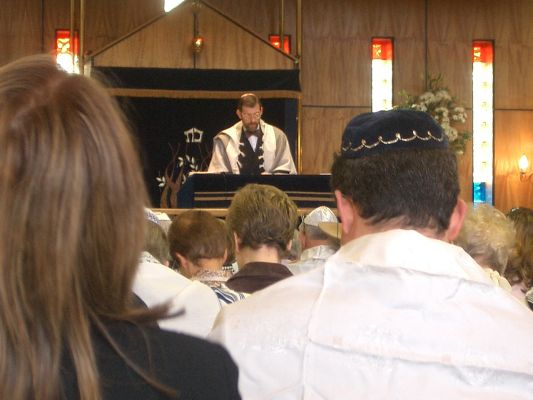
Contemporary Reform service held in Sinai Synagogue, with some congregants wearing head coverings and prayer shawls.

Kohler retired in 1923. Rabbi Samuel S. Cohon was appointed HUC Chair of Theology in his stead, serving until 1956. Cohon, born near Minsk, was emblematic of the new generation of East European-descended clergy within American Reform. Deeply influenced by Ahad Ha'am and Mordecai Kaplan, he viewed Judaism as a Civilization, rather than a religion, though he and other Reform sympathizers of Kaplan fully maintained the notions of Election and revelation, which the latter denied. Cohon valued Jewish particularism over universalist leanings, encouraging the reincorporation of traditional elements long discarded, not as part of a comprehensive legalistic framework but as means to rekindle ethnic cohesion. His approach echoed popular sentiment in the East Coast. So did Solomon Freehof, son to immigrants from Chernihiv, who advocated a selective rapprochement with halakha, which was to offer "guidance, not governance"; Freehof advocated replacing the sterile mood of community life, allowing isolated practices to emerge spontaneously and reincorporating old ones. He redrafted the Union Prayer Book in 1940 to include more old formulae and authored many responsa, though he always stressed compliance was voluntary.

Cohon and Freehof rose against the background of the Great Depression, when many congregations teetered on the threshold of collapse. Growing Antisemitism in Europe led German Liberals on similar paths. Rabbis Leo Baeck, Max Dienemann and Seligmann himself turned to stressing Jewish peoplehood and tradition. The Nazis' takeover in 1933 effected a religious revival in communities long plagued by apathy and assimilation. The great changes convinced the CCAR to adopt a new set of principles. On 29 May 1937, in Columbus, Ohio, a "Declaration of Principles" (eschewing the more formal, binding "platform"), promoted a greater degree of ritual observance, supported Zionism – considered by the Classicists in the past as, at best, a remedy for the unemancipated Jewish masses in Russia and Romania, while they did not regard the Jews as a nation in the modern sense – and opened not with theology, but by the statement, "Judaism is the historical religious experience of the Jewish people". The Columbus Principles signified the transformation from "Classical" to the "New Reform Judaism", characterized by a lesser focus on abstract concepts and a more positive attitude to practice and traditional elements.

The Holocaust and the establishment of the State of Israel reinforced the tendency. The Americanization and move to the suburbs in the 1950s facilitated a double effect: the secular Jewish ideologies of the immigrants' generation, like Bundism or Labour Zionism, became anachronistic. Military service exposed recruits to the family-oriented, moderate religiosity of the middle-class United States. Many sought an affiliation in the early years of the Cold War, when lack of such raised suspicion of leftist or communist sympathies. The "Return to Tradition", as it was termed, smoothed the path for many such into UAHC. It grew from 290 communities with 50,000 affiliated households in 1937 to 560 with 255,000 in 1956. A similar shift to nostalgic traditionalism was expressed overseas. Even the purist Liberals in Britain introduced minor customs that bore sentimental value; Bar Mitzvah replaced confirmation.

World War II shattered many of the assumptions about human progress and benevolence held by liberal denominations, Reform included. A new generation of theologians attempted to formulate a response. Thinkers such as Eugene Borowitz and J.J. Petuchowski turned mainly to existentialism, portraying humans in a fragile, complex relationship with the divine. While religious humanism was ever-present, it remained confined to a small group, and official positions retained a theistic approach. But the main focus in American Reform lay elsewhere: in 1946, Rabbi Maurice Eisendrath was appointed President of the UAHC. He turned the notion of Tikkun Olam, "repairing of the world", into the practical expression of affiliation, leading involvement in the civil rights movement, Vietnam War opposition and other progressive causes. In 1954, the first permanent Reform congregation was established in the State of Israel, again at Jerusalem. The Israel Movement for Reform and Progressive Judaism was registered in 1971, and the worldwide movement moved the WUPJ's headquarters to Jerusalem in 1974, signalling its growing attachment to Zionism.

The 1960s and 70s saw the rise of multiculturalism and the weakening of organized religion in favour of personal spirituality. A growing "return to ethnicity" among the young made items such as prayer shawls fashionable again. In 1963, HUC-graduate Sherwin Wine seceded to form the openly atheistic Birmingham Temple, declaring that for him Judaism was a cultural tradition, not a faith. Knowing that many in their audience held quite overlapping ideas, the pressure on the CCAR to move toward nontheism grew.

In 1975, the lack of consensus surfaced during the compilation of a new standard prayer book, "Gates of Prayer". To accommodate all, ten liturgies for morning service and six for the evening were offered for each congregation to choose of, from very traditional to one that retained the Hebrew text for God but translated it as "Eternal Power", condemned by many as de facto humanistic. "Gates of Prayer" symbolized the movement's adoption of what would be termed "Big Tent Judaism", welcoming all, over theological clarity. In the following year, an attempt to draft a new platform for the CCAR in San Francisco ended with poor results. Led by Borowitz, any notion of issuing guidelines was abandoned in favour of a "Centenary Perspective" with few coherent statements. The "Big Tent", while taking its toll on the theoreticians, did substantially bolster constituency. The UAHC slowly caught up with Conservative Judaism on the path toward becoming the largest American denomination. Yet it did not erase boundaries completely and rejected outright those who held syncretic beliefs like Jewbu and Messianic Judaism, and also Sherwin Wine-style Secular Humanistic Judaism. Congregation Beth Adam, which excised all references to God from its liturgy, was denied UAHC membership by a landslide vote of 113:15 in 1994.

In 1972, the first Reform female rabbi, Sally Priesand, was ordained at HUC. In 1977, the CCAR declared that the biblical ban on male same-sex intercourse referred only to the pagan customs prevalent at the time it was composed, and gradually accepted openly LGBT constituents and clergy. The first LGBT rabbi, Stacy Offner, was instated in 1988, and full equality was declared in 1990. Same-sex marriage guidelines were published in 1997. In 1978, UAHC President Alexander Schindler admitted that measures aimed at curbing intermarriage rates by various sanctions, whether on the concerned parties or on rabbis assisting or acknowledging them (ordinances penalizing such involvement were passed in 1909, 1947 and 1962), were no longer effective. He called for a policy of outreach and tolerance, rejecting "intermarriage, but not the intermarried", hoping to convince gentile spouses to convert. In 1983, the CCAR accepted patrilineal descent, a step taken by British Liberals already in the 1950s. UAHC membership grew by 23% in 1975–1985, to 1.3 million. An estimated 10,000 intermarried couples were joining annually.

On 26 May 1999, after a prolonged debate and six widely different drafts rejected, a "Statement of Principles for Reform Judaism" was adopted in Pittsburgh by the Central Conference of American Rabbis. It affirmed the "reality and oneness of God", the Torah as "God's ongoing revelation to our people" and committed to the "ongoing study of the whole array of Commandments and to the fulfillment of those that address us as individuals and as a community. Some of these sacred obligations have long been observed by Reform Jews; others, both ancient and modern, demand renewed attention." While the wording was carefully crafted in order not to displease the estimated 20%–25% of membership that retained Classicist persuasions, it did raise condemnation from many of them. In 2008, the Society for Classical Reform Judaism was founded to mobilize and coordinate those who preferred the old universalist, ethics-based and de-ritualized religious style, with its unique aesthetic components.

== See also ==
- Cantor in Reform Judaism
- Reform Judaism (magazine)
- Brit shalom
