= Célia Surget =

French rabbi

Célia Surget is France's second female rabbi. She grew up in Geneva and was ordained at Leo Baeck College in 2007. She then joined Paris's Reform synagogue and the Mouvement Juif Liberal de France (Liberal Jewish Movement of France), and was a driving force in the creation and development of the Reform youth movement Netzer France. She joined the Radlett and Bushey Reform Synagogue in the United Kingdom in 2012.
