= Floriane Chinsky =

French rabbi

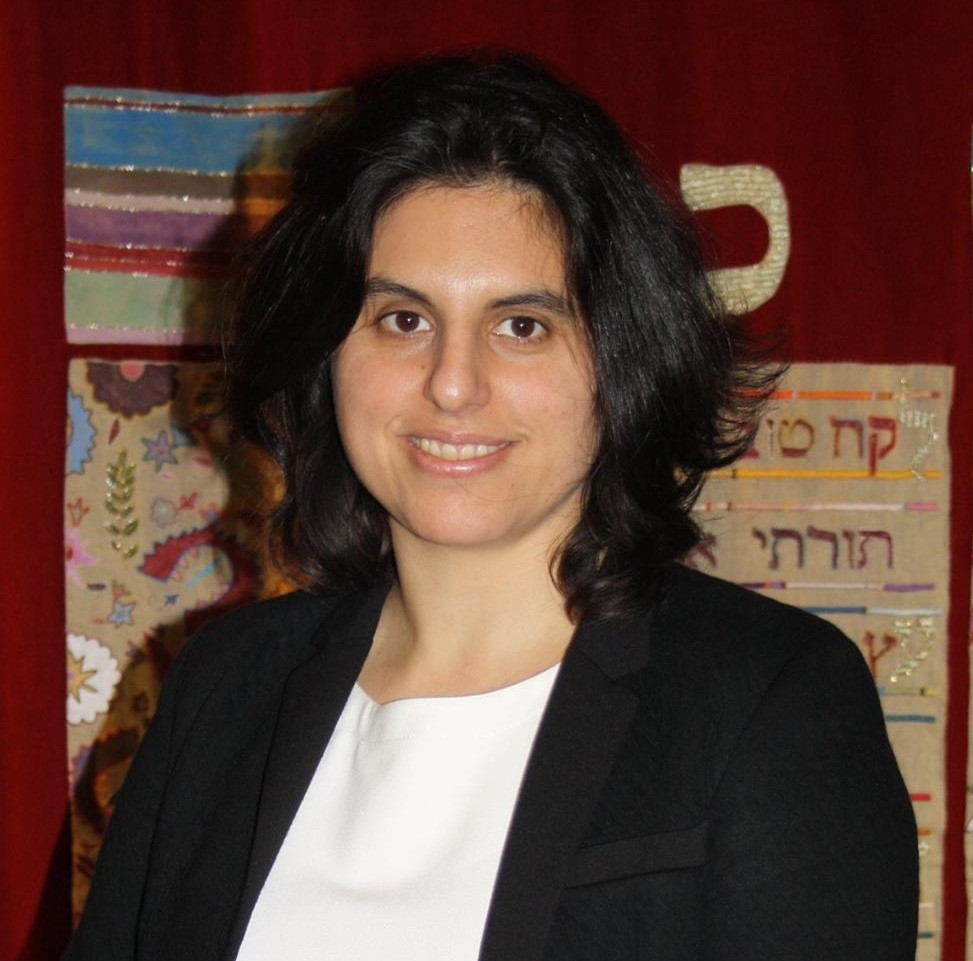

Personal life
- Born: 1974 (age 51–52) Paris

Religious life
- Religion: Judaism

Jewish leader
- Synagogue: MJLF in eastern Paris
- Yeshiva: Schechter Institute of Jewish Studies
- Organisation: Liberal Jewish Movement of France

Floriane Chinsky (born 1974 in Paris, France) is the first female rabbi in Belgium.

In 2005, she was ordained as a rabbi at the Schechter Institute of Jewish Studies in Jerusalem; the same year she received a Ph.D. in sociology of law, with a thesis studying the social representations of Jewish law in France. She became Belgium's first female rabbi in 2005, at Beth Hillel, Brussels’ Reform congregation.

In 2010, she became the rabbi at the Masorti congregation, Neve Shalom, in Saint-Germain-en-Laye, and in 2013, became a rabbi at the Liberal Jewish Movement of France in Paris. She is the third woman to become a rabbi in France.

In 2021, she published the book Des femme sarah et des dieux (Women and Gods) with Kahina Bahloul (Imame) and Emmanuelle Seyboltd (Pastor) and in 2025 "En finir avec les idées fausses sur le judaïsme, les juives et les juives" (refute false ideas about judaïsm and Jews).

She founded the association "Cocreer" to teach nonviolent activism.

== See also ==
- Timeline of women rabbis
