= Salomon Formstecher =

German rabbi (1808–1889)

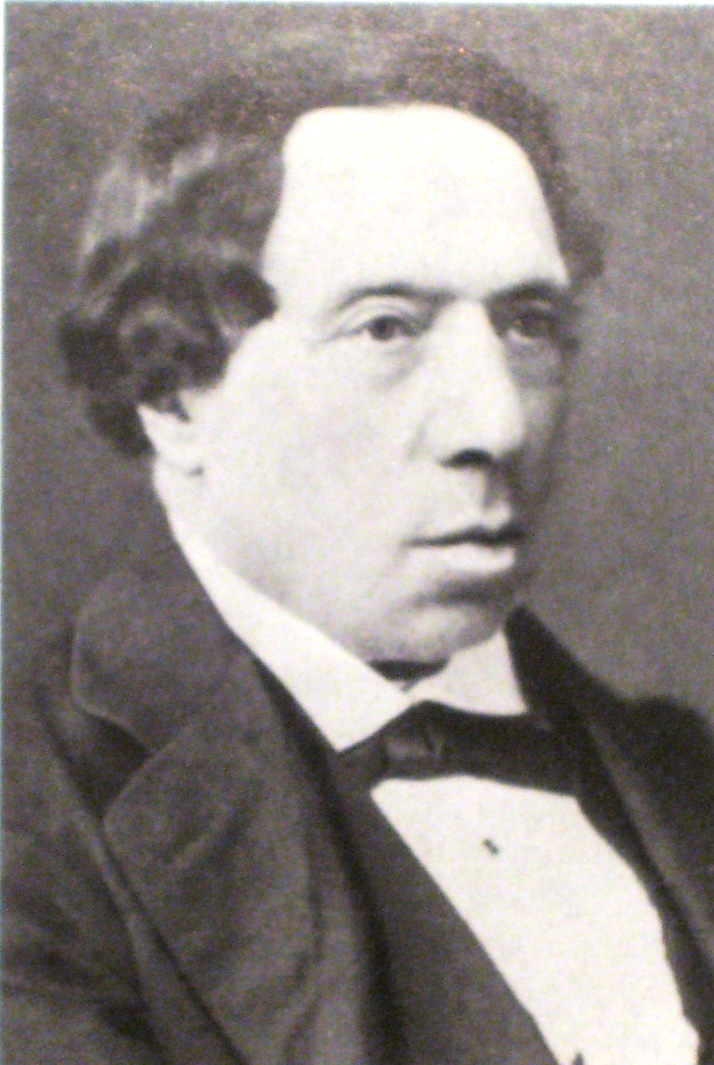
Salomon Formstecher

Salomon Formstecher, in English also Solomon, (1808–1889) was a German reform rabbi and student of Jewish theology.

Formstecher was born in Offenbach am Main on 28 July 1808. After graduating (Ph.D. 1831) from Giessen University, he settled in his native city as a preacher, succeeding Rabbi Metz in 1842; he filled this office until his death on 24 April 1889.

During his long ministry he strove to harmonize the religious and social life of the Jews with the requirements of modern civilization. His aims were expressed at the Rabbinical Conference of Brunswick, Frankfurt, Breslau, and Kassel in the conferences of the German rabbis. The most important of his works is Religion des Geistes ("Religion of the Spirit," Frankfurt-am-Main, 1841). It contains a systematic analysis of the principles of Judaism. The author endeavors to demonstrate that Judaism was a necessary manifestation, and that its evolution tends in the direction of a universal religion for civilized mankind. Judaism, in contrast with paganism, considers the Divinity to be a Being separate from nature, and allows no doubt of God's existence. Consequently, any theogony, any emanation, any dualism must be rejected. Formstecher concludes his work with a history of Judaism which is a valuable contribution to Jewish religious philosophy.

Formstecher's other works are:

- Zwölf Predigten, Würzburg, 1833
- Israelitisches Andachtsbüchlein zur Erweiterung und Ausbildung der Ersten Religiösen Gefühle und Begriffe, Offenbach, 1836
- Mosaische Religionslehre, Giessen, 1860
- Buchenstein und Cohnberg, a novel, Frankfort-on-the-Main, 1863
- Israel's Klage und Israel's Trost, Offenbach, 1835
- Ueber das Wesen und über den Fortgang der Israelitischen Gottesverehrung

Formstecher contributed to many periodicals, and edited in 1859, in collaboration with L. Stein, the periodical Der Freitagabend, and in 1861, with K. Klein, the Israelitische Wochenschrift.

== Jewish Encyclopedia bibliography ==
- Meyer Kayserling, Bibliothek Jüdischer Kanzelredner, ii. 137
