= Daniel Farhi =

French rabbi (1941–2021)

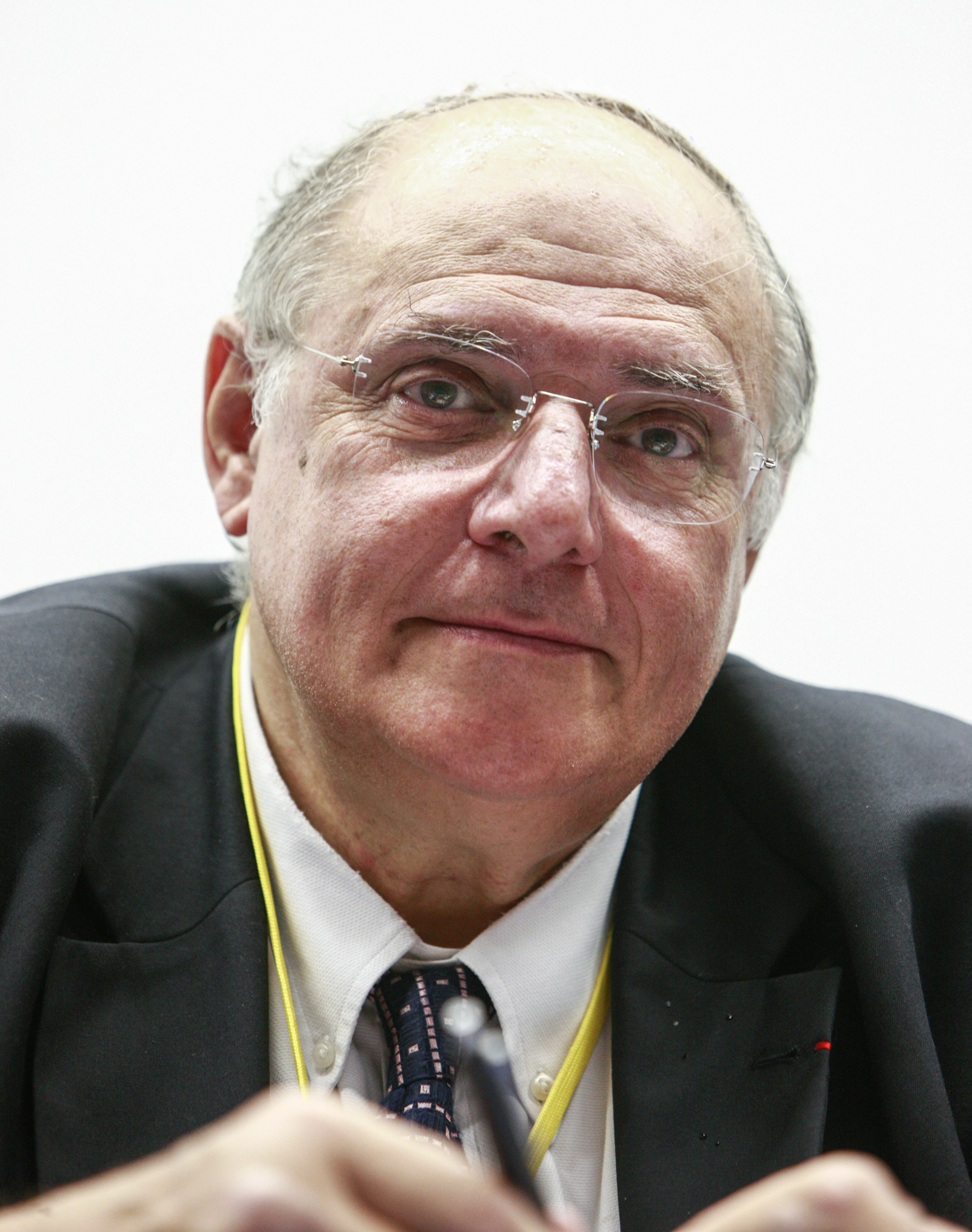
- Farhi in 2008
- Born: 18 November 1941; Paris, France
- Died: 23 August 2021 (aged 79); Nice, France
- Occupation: Rabbi

Daniel Farhi (18 November 1941 – 23 August 2021) was a French liberal rabbi.

== Biography ==
=== Early life ===
Farhi was born in Paris on 18 November 1941 to Samuel and Estréa Farhi, who were originally from İzmir, Turkey. During World War II, he was hidden with his sister, Françoise, by a Protestant family in Besançon, who were later honored as Righteous Among the Nations.

=== Rabbinical career ===
He received semikhah in February 1966 and became rabbi of the Union Libérale Israélite de France from 1967 to 1977, succeeding André Zaoui.

On 2 June 1977, Farhi founded the Liberal Jewish Movement of France with Roger Benarosh and Colette Kessler. In 1981, he created the Jewish liberal newspaper Tenou'a. He strongly defended the idea that Halakha (Jewish law), must continue to be amended to keep up with societal changes so that the return of the Sanhedrin can be appropriately applied to modern times.

Farhi was active in dialogues with Christian and Muslim groups. He also worked to preserve the memory of the Holocaust and was a friend of Serge and Beate Klarsfeld. In 1975, he became an activist within the Sons and Daughters of Jewish Deportees from France and subsequently helped to organize eight pilgrimages to Auschwitz. In 1990, Farhi became involved with La Paix maintenant and, in January 2010, founded the Centre Culturel Judéo-Espagnol/Al Syete, an association which brought together different Judeo-Spanish organizations.

=== Personal life and death ===
Farhi died in Nice on 23 August 2021 at the age of 79. He was the father of three children, including Rabbi Gabriel Farhi.

== Distinctions ==
- Knight of the Ordre national du Mérite (1988)
- Officer of the Legion of Honour (2012)

== Publications ==
=== Prayer books ===
- Siddour Taher Libénou
- Mahzor Anénou

=== Essays ===
- Parler aux enfants d’Israël
- Un judaïsme dans le siècle (1997)
- Au dernier survivant
- Paroles sur la Shoah (2007)
- Anthologie du judaisme libéral (2007)
- Au dernier survivant (2008)

=== Interview books ===
- Profession Rabbin (2006)
