= Copernic Street Synagogue =

Reform synagogue in Paris, France

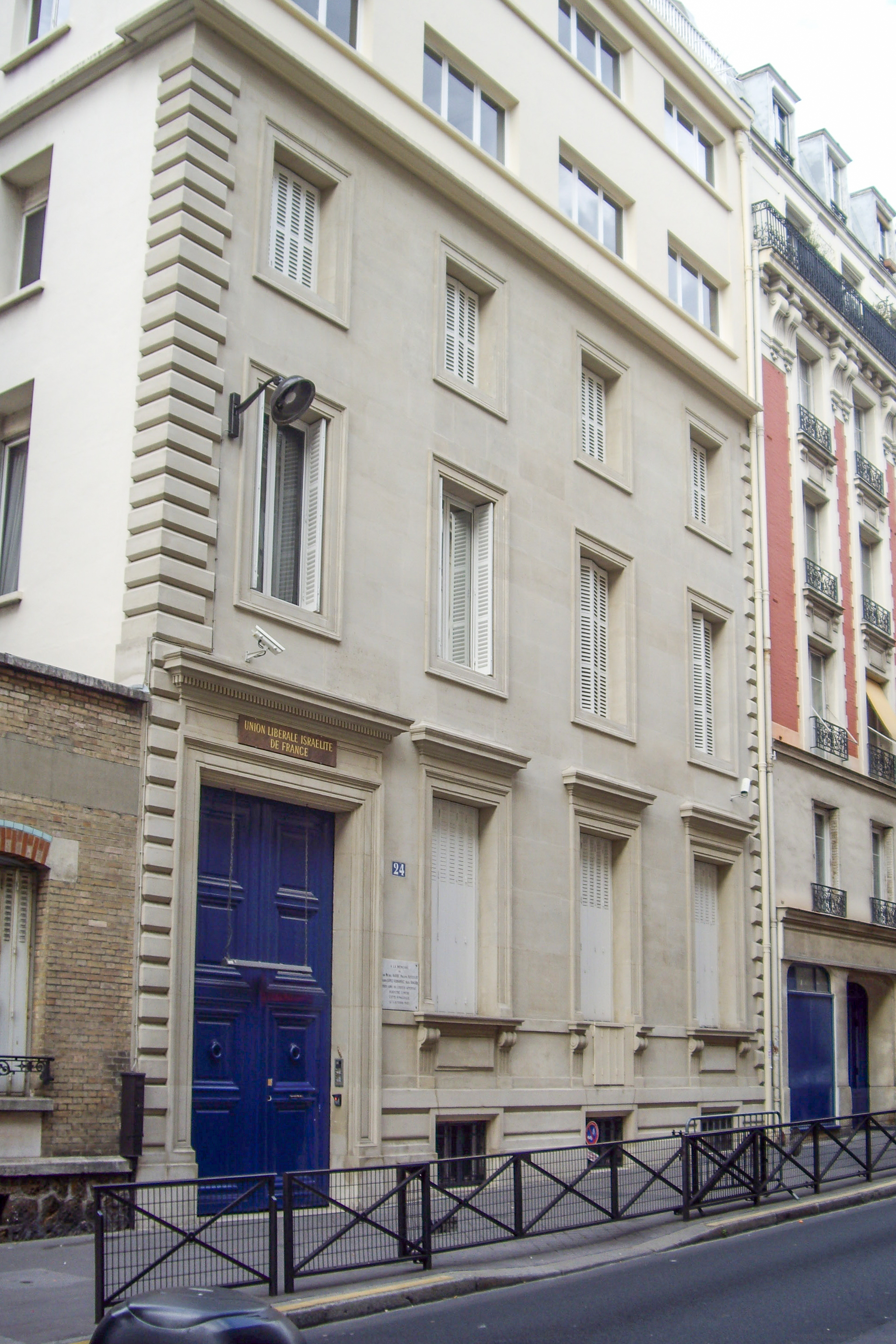
- The synagogue in 2010

- Location of the synagogue in Paris

Religion
- Affiliation: Reform Judaism
- Ecclesiastical or organisational status: Synagogue
- Ownership: Liberal Jewish Movement of France
- Year consecrated: 1907
- Status: Active

Location
- Location: 24 rue Copernic, XVIe arrondissement, Paris
- Country: France
- Coordinates: 48°52′10″N 2°17′20″E

Architecture
- Architect: Marcel Lemarié
- Type: Synagogue architecture
- Style: Art Deco
- Founder: Louis Germain Lévy

Website
- copernic.paris

The Copernic Street Synagogue (Synagogue de la rue Copernic) is a Reform Jewish congregation and synagogue, located in the XVIe arrondissement of Paris, France. Inaugurated on 1 December 1907, it is the oldest Reform synagogue in France. Rabbi Pauline Bebe, the first (and, until 2007, the only) woman rabbi in France. The community is affiliated with Judaism in Motion.

== History ==
The synagogue was founded in 1907 by Rabbi Louis Germain Lévy.

=== 1941 attack ===
The night of October 2–3, 1941 the synagogue was attacked by the Mouvement Social Revolutionnaire. A bomb caused the partial destruction of the edifice of the building. The synagogue was damaged in a Fascist riot in 1941, and was repaired after the war.

=== 1980 attack ===
On October 3, 1980, on the eve of Simchat Torah, a bombing was directed against the synagogue of the ULIF. A bomb hidden in a motorcycle went off outside the synagogue, killing four pedestrians.

The bombing was the start of a string of other attacks by terrorists against Jews in Europe. In August 1981, a synagogue in Vienna, Austria, was attacked by Palestinian gunmen, killing two people, and in October 1981, three people were killed when a bomb went off in the center of Antwerp, Belgium.

On September 23, 2019 it was announced that the Union Libérale Israélite de France and the Mouvement juif libéral de France would merge, creating an association called "Judaïsme en mouvement" (Judaism in Movement).

== Synagogue building ==
The original building, a painters studio located at 24 rue Copernic, was rented in 1907 and later bought in 1921. In 1923-1924, having acquired the building, the community began construction on an actual synagogue, preserving the original oratory as a social hall for Kiddush. The new building was built in Art Deco style, a rare choice for the time.

The building was designed by Marcel Lemarié (1864-1941), architect and author of L’Architecture moderne et l’hygiène. Lemarié also designed the Palais de la Danse for the 1900 Paris Exhibition, the building that became the Belleville Pathé cinema, the Post Office at 93 boulevard du Montparnasse, the Luxor Cinema and the Château de Toussus-le-Noble, which is listed as a Monument historique.

In 1968, the room was enlarged, following the acquisition of the neighboring building at 22 rue Copernic and the building was increased by two floors.

== Leadership ==
Rabbi Louis Germain Levy (1870-1946) trained at the Seminaire Israelite de France served as its first rabbi. Levy was succeeded by Rabbi Andre Chalom Zaoui (1916-2009) in 1946. In 1970, Rabbi Daniel Farhi (1941-2021) was appointed the new senior rabbi and left ULIF in 1977 to create the second Reform synagogue of Paris, Mouvement Juif Liberal de France. Rabbi Michael Williams assumed the spiritual leadership of the community in 1977.

Since 2014, the rabbinic leaders have been Philippe Haddad, who was ordained by the Seminaire Israelite de France, and Jonas Jacquelin, who was ordained by Abraham Geiger Kolleg.

== See also ==
- History of the Jews in France
- List of synagogues in France
- Liberal Jewish Movement of France
