= Liberal Jewish Movement of France =

Jewish religious reformist organization in France

- Abbreviation: MJLF
- Established: June 1977; 49 years ago
- Founder: Rabbi Daniel Farhi
- Founded at: Paris
- Location: Paris, France
- Coordinates: 48°50′57″N 2°17′02″E
- Affiliations: World Union for Progressive Judaism

The Liberal Jewish Movement of France or MJLF was a Jewish liberal cultural and religious association affiliated with the World Union for Progressive Judaism.

On September 23, 2019, the Liberal Jewish Movement of France and the Liberal Jewish Union of France merged to form Judaism in Motion.

== Overview ==
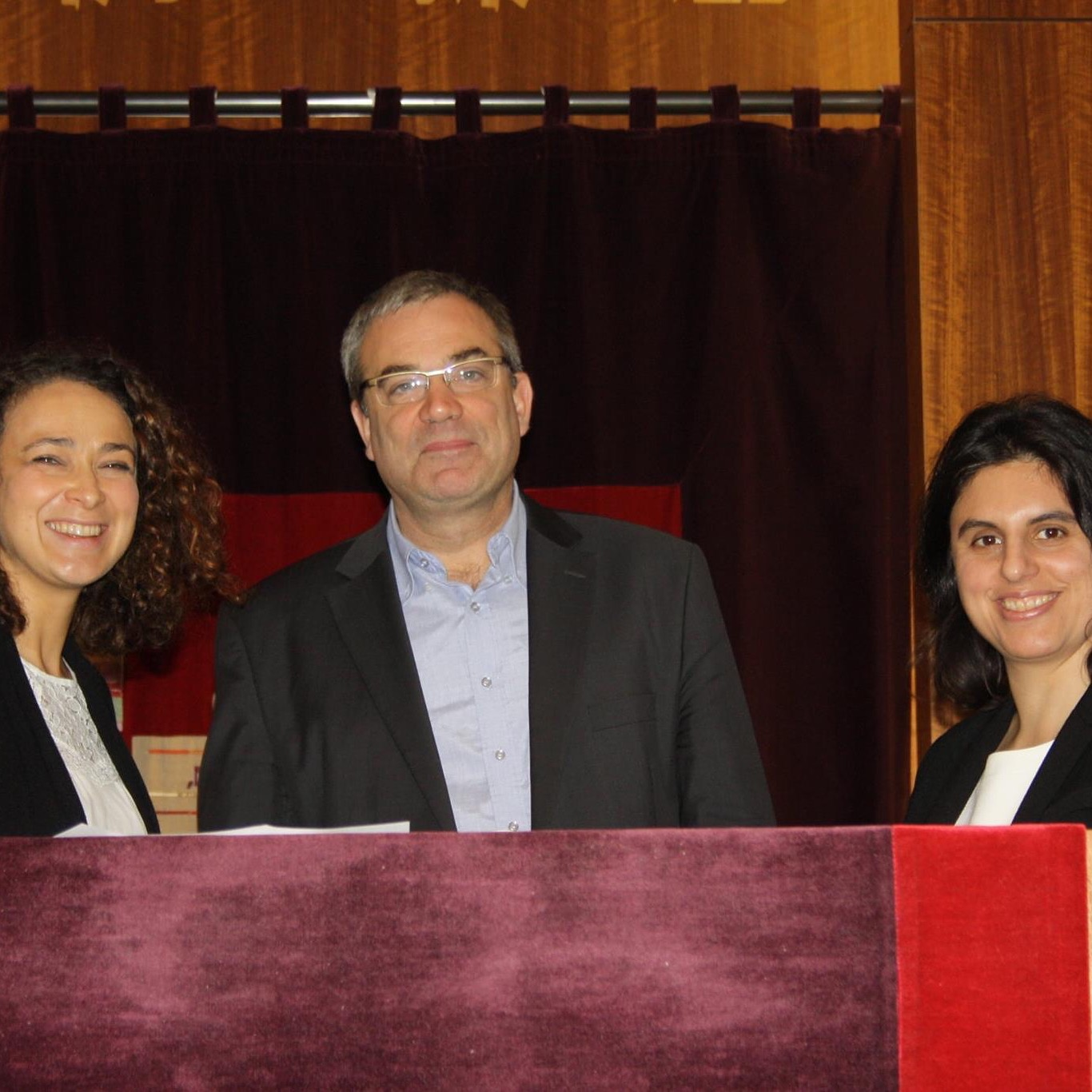
Rabbis Delphine Horvilleur, Yann Boissière, and Floriane Chinsky.

The MJLF was created in June 1977 by fifty families under the leadership of Rabbi Daniel Farhi, first President Roger Benarrosh, and Colette Kessler, head of education. Many rabbis have contributed to the development of MJLF, including Daniel Farhi (1977-2009) Stephen Berkowitz (1989–92;1995-1997; 2004-2013), Oren Postel, Pauline Bebe (1990-1995), Gabriel Farhi (1995-2007), and Célia Surget. Three rabbis currently provide the leadership for the movement: Floriane Chinsky, Yann Boissière, and Delphine Horvilleur.

The MJLF operates a joint synagogue and community center on 11 rue Gaston de Cavaillet in the 15th arrondissement, on the Front de Seine, a few hundred meters from the old "Vel d'Hiv". A second synagogue, established in 1983 to expand in eastern Paris, located at 24 rue du Surmelin in the 20th arrondissement.

== See also ==
- Communauté Juive Libérale
- History of the Jews in France
- List of synagogues in France
- Union Libérale Israélite de France
