= Delphine Horvilleur =

French rabbi

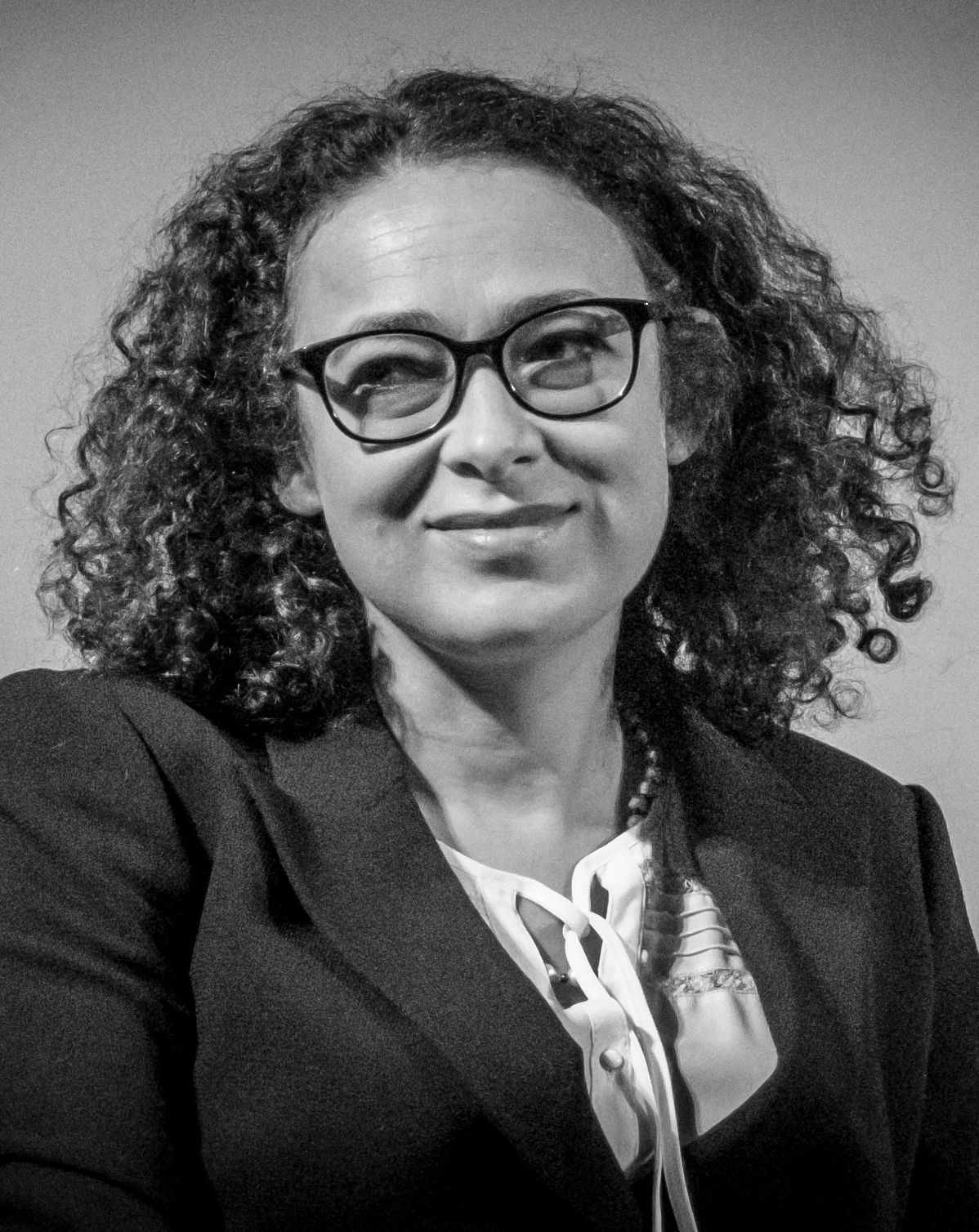
- Delphine Horvilleur in 2019

Personal life
- Born: 8 November 1974 (age 51) Nancy, France
- Spouse: Ariel Weil
- Education: Hebrew University of Jerusalem; Hebrew Union College-Jewish Institute of Religion
- Occupation: Rabbi, writer
- Website: delphinehorvilleur.com

Religious life
- Religion: Judaism

Delphine Horvilleur (French pronunciation: [dɛlfin ɔʁvilœʁ]; born 8 November 1974) is a French rabbi and writer, the third woman to become a rabbi in France. From 2008 to 2026 she served as a rabbi of the Liberal Jewish Movement of France, which merged in 2019 into Judaïsme en mouvement, a Jewish liberal association affiliated with the World Union for Progressive Judaism. She is the editorial director of Tenou'a, an online journal of Jewish thought. Her books include Vivre avec nos morts (2021), published in English as Living with Our Dead (2024).

== Life ==
Horvilleur was born and raised in Nancy, then moved to Jerusalem at the age of 17 and studied life sciences at the Hebrew University. On 4 November 1995 she attended the Tel Aviv peace rally at the end of which Yitzhak Rabin was assassinated. Five years later, she came back to Paris and worked as a journalist for France 2 (2000-2003), notably at the channel's Jerusalem bureau with Charles Enderlin and as a reporter for its evening news, then as New York correspondent of the Jewish radio station RCJ (2003-2008). She studied with well-known Jewish scholars, such as French philosopher Marc-Alain Ouaknin and ex-Chief Rabbi Gilles Bernheim, and eventually moved to New York and studied at Drisha Yeshiva. She was ordained at the Hebrew Union College-Jewish Institute of Religion in New York in 2008, and later returned to France. In 2016, Najat Vallaud-Belkacem awarded her a special commendation.

In 2012, by presidential decree, she became the first woman rabbi appointed to France's National AIDS Council.

In 2009, Horvilleur became editor-in-chief of Tenou'a, a quarterly journal published by the Tenou'a association from the Liberal Jewish Movement of France. It is a reference magazine of liberal Jewish thought in France, where various religious sensibilities are found around societal issues (feminism, environment, sexuality, migration policy, etc.). As of 2024 Horvilleur was Editorial Director. In 2018 she founded the Ateliers Tenou'a, monthly study circles on texts of the Jewish tradition, also held in other cities including Brussels.

In 2020, during the COVID-19 pandemic, Horvilleur became known for her weekly online Zoom talks on Jewish texts. Her popular lectures were attended by a variety of people outside of the Jewish community.

In August 2022, she delivered the inaugural lecture opening the academic year at Sciences Po in Paris.

Her book Il n'y a pas de Ajar was adapted for the stage in 2023, directed by Johanna Nizard and Arnaud Aldigé at the Théâtre de l'Atelier. In 2025, Le Sens des choses, a French television series adapted from her book Vivre avec nos morts, was released on Max.

In May 2025, after the Israeli government announced a plan of "conquest" of Gaza, she published a statement denouncing what she called Israel's "political rout and moral bankruptcy", saying she spoke "out of love for Israel"; the statement drew wide support as well as death threats from supporters of the Israeli government.

In February 2026, she delivered remarks at Central Synagogue in New York. In June 2026, she announced her departure from Judaïsme en mouvement, effective that autumn, in order to develop her teaching of Jewish thought.

She is a member of the reading committee of the Comédie-Française, as one of four outside personalities appointed by the French Minister of Culture.

Horvilleur is married to Ariel Weil, mayor of the Paris Centre arrondissement. They have three children.

== Honours and awards ==
- Knight of the Ordre national du Mérite (2015)
- Named a "Hero Against Extremism and Intolerance" by the Global Hope Coalition, award presented by Ronald Lauder in New York (2018)
- Officer of the Ordre des Arts et des Lettres (2019)
- Knight of the Legion of Honour (2020)
- Prix Babelio, non-fiction (2021), Prix des Savoirs (2021) and Prix Renaudot du livre de poche (2022), for Vivre avec nos morts
- Prize for Understanding and Tolerance of the Jewish Museum Berlin, awarded jointly with Margot Friedländer (2024)

== Publications ==
- Notarikon: The Rabbinic Art of Word-breaking. Brookdale Center: Hebrew Union College-Jewish Institute of Religion. 2008. OCLC 192021507.
- Horvilleur, Delphine (2011). "Lifting the Curtain - The theatrical Kol Nidre". In Hoffman, Rabbi Lawrence A. (ed.). All these Vows. Jewish Lights Publishing. pp. 150–154.
- En tenue d'Ève : féminin, pudeur et judaïsme (in French). Grasset. 2013. ISBN 978-2757869666. OCLC 1024070980.
- Comment les rabbins font les enfants ? : sexe, transmission, identité dans le judaïsme (in French). Grasset. 2015. ISBN 978-2253186090. OCLC 993080865.
- Des mille et une façons d'être juif ou musulman (in French). Seuil. 2017. ISBN 978-2021349313. OCLC 1033520372. with Rachid Benzine
- Réflexions sur la question antisémite (in French). Grasset. 2019. ISBN 978-2253820345. OCLC 1140368044. Published in English as Anti-Semitism Revisited: How the Rabbis Made Sense of Hatred. Translated by David Bellos. MacLehose Press. 2021. ISBN 978-1529404753.
- Comprendre le monde (in French). Bayard Culture. 2020. ISBN 978-2227497993. OCLC 1163855144.
- Le Rabbin et le Psychanalyste : l'exigence d'interprétation (in French). Éditions Hermann. 2020. ISBN 979-1-0370-0317-1.
- Vivre avec nos morts (in French). Grasset. 2021. ISBN 9782246826941. Published in English as Living with Our Dead: On Loss and Consolation. Translated by Lisa Appignanesi. Europa Editions. 2024. ISBN 978-1609457952.
- Il n'y a pas de Ajar (in French). Grasset. 2022. ISBN 9782246831563.
- Comment ça va pas ? Conversations après le 7 octobre (in French). Grasset. 2024. ISBN 978-2246838463.
- Euh… Comment parler de la mort aux enfants (in French). Bayard/Grasset. 2025. ISBN 978-2-227-50301-4.
