= List of synagogues in France =

This is an incomplete list of synagogues, current or former Jewish houses of prayer, in France.

Name	Location	Built	Architectural style(s)	Status	Denomination	Image	Notes
Amiens	Amiens, Somme	2017	Modernist	Active	Orthodox		
Arcachon	Arcachon	1879		Active	Sephardi		
Beth Meir	Bastia, Corsica	1934	Vernacular	Active	Orthodox		
Belfort	Belfort	1857	Byzantine Revival	Active			
Besançon	Besançon	1870	Moorish Revival	Active			
Great (Bordeaux)	Bordeaux	1882	Romanesque Revival; Byzantine Revival	Active	Sephardi		
Caen	Caen, Normandy	1966		Active			
Guebwiller	Guebwiller, Haut-Rhin	1872	Romanesque Revival; Byzantine Revival	Active			
Hochfelden	Hochfelden, Alsace	1841		Active			
Ingwiller	Ingwiller, Alsace	1970		Active			
Lille	Lille, Hauts-de-France	1891	Romanesque Revival; Byzantine Revival	Active			
Great (Lyon)	Lyon, Auvergne-Rhône-Alpes	1864	Byzantine Revival	Active	Orthodox		
Keren Or	Lyon, Auvergne-Rhône-Alpes	2015		Active	Reform		
Great (Marseille)	Marseille	1864	Romanesque Revival; Byzantine Revival	Active	Sephardi		
Or Thora (maybe Or Torah)	Marseille	1962		Former; (now mosque)			
Neuilly	Neuilly-sur-Seine, Hauts-de-Seine	1878	Byzantine Revival	Active	Orthodox		
Nice	Nice, Provence-Alpes-Côte d'Azur	1886	Byzantine Revival	Active	Orthodox		
Rouen	Rouen, Normandy	1950		Active	Orthodox		
Saint-Avold	Saint-Avold, Grand Est	1956	Modernist	Active			
Sedan	Sedan, Ardennes	1878	Romanesque Revival; Byzantine Revival	Former; gallery			
Great Synagogue of Peace (Strasbourg)	Strasbourg	1958	Modernist	Active			
du Quai Kléber	Strasbourg	1898	Romanesque Revival	Destroyed			
Traenheim	Traenheim			Active			
Liberal Jewish Movement of France				Active	Reform		
Versailles	Versailles, Île-de-France	1886	Romanesque Revival	Active			
Vesoul	Vesoul, Bourgogne-Franche-Comté	1875		Former			

== In Paris ==
Name	Arrondissement	Built	Architectural style(s)	Status	Denomination	Image	Notes
Adath Shalom	XV^{e}	1989		Active	Conservative; Masorti movement		
Agoudas Hakehilos	IV^{e}	1914	Art Nouveau	Active	Orthodox		
Communauté Juive Libérale	XI^{e}	2006		Active	Reform		
Don Isaac Abravanel	XI^{e}	1962	Modernist	Active	Orthodox		
Edmond J. Safra Synagogue	XVII^{e}	2019		Active			
Grand (Paris)	IX^{e}	1874	Romanesque Revival; Byzantine Revival	Active	Orthodox		
Kehilat Gesher	XVII^{e}	1993		Active	Reform		
Montmartre	XVIII^{e}	1939	International	Active	Orthodox		
de Nazareth	III^{e}	1852	Moorish Revival	Active	Orthodox		
des Tournelles	IV^{e}	1876	Romanesque Revival; Byzantine Revival	Active	Orthodox		
Union Libérale Israélite de France	XVI^{e}	1907	Art Deco	Active	Reform		
