= Kehilat Gesher =

Liberal synagogue located in Paris, France

Kehillat Gesher
- Location of the synagogue in Paris

Religion
- Affiliation: Reform Judaism
- Ecclesiastical or organizational status: Synagogue
- Leadership: Rabbi Tom Cohen
- Status: Active

Location
- Location: 11 avenue delaPortedeChamperret, XVIIe arrondissement, Paris
- Country: France
- Interactive map of Kehillat Gesher
- Coordinates: 48°52′51″N 2°18′08″E

Architecture
- Type: Synagogue architecture
- Established: 1993 (as a congregation)
- Completed: 1993

Website
- kehilatgesher.org (in French); kehilatgesher.org/en/ (in English)

Kehilat Gesher (transliterated from Hebrew as "Community of bridges") is a Liberal Jewish congregation and synagogue, located on Rue Léon Cogniet, in the XVIIe arrondissement of Paris, France.

The synagogue was founded in 1993 by Jewish and Franco-American family, led by Tom Cohen, a rabbi from Portland, Oregon, in the United States. Cohen is married to Pauline Bebe, the first female rabbi in France and the founder of the Communauté juive libérale d'Île-de-France (CJL).

The congregation is a founder of the Francophone Federation of Liberal Judaism and the Assembly of Liberal Judaism of France. It is the only multi-lingual progressive congregation in Paris, with services delivered in Hebrew, English, and French. Its name reflects the congregation's approach to building bridges between French and English speaking nationalities, between Sephardic and Ashkenazi heritages, and between spiritual tradition and modern life.

== See also ==
- History of the Jews in France
- List of synagogues in France
