= European Jewish Center =

Cultural center and synagogue in Paris, France

Edmond J. Safra Synagogue
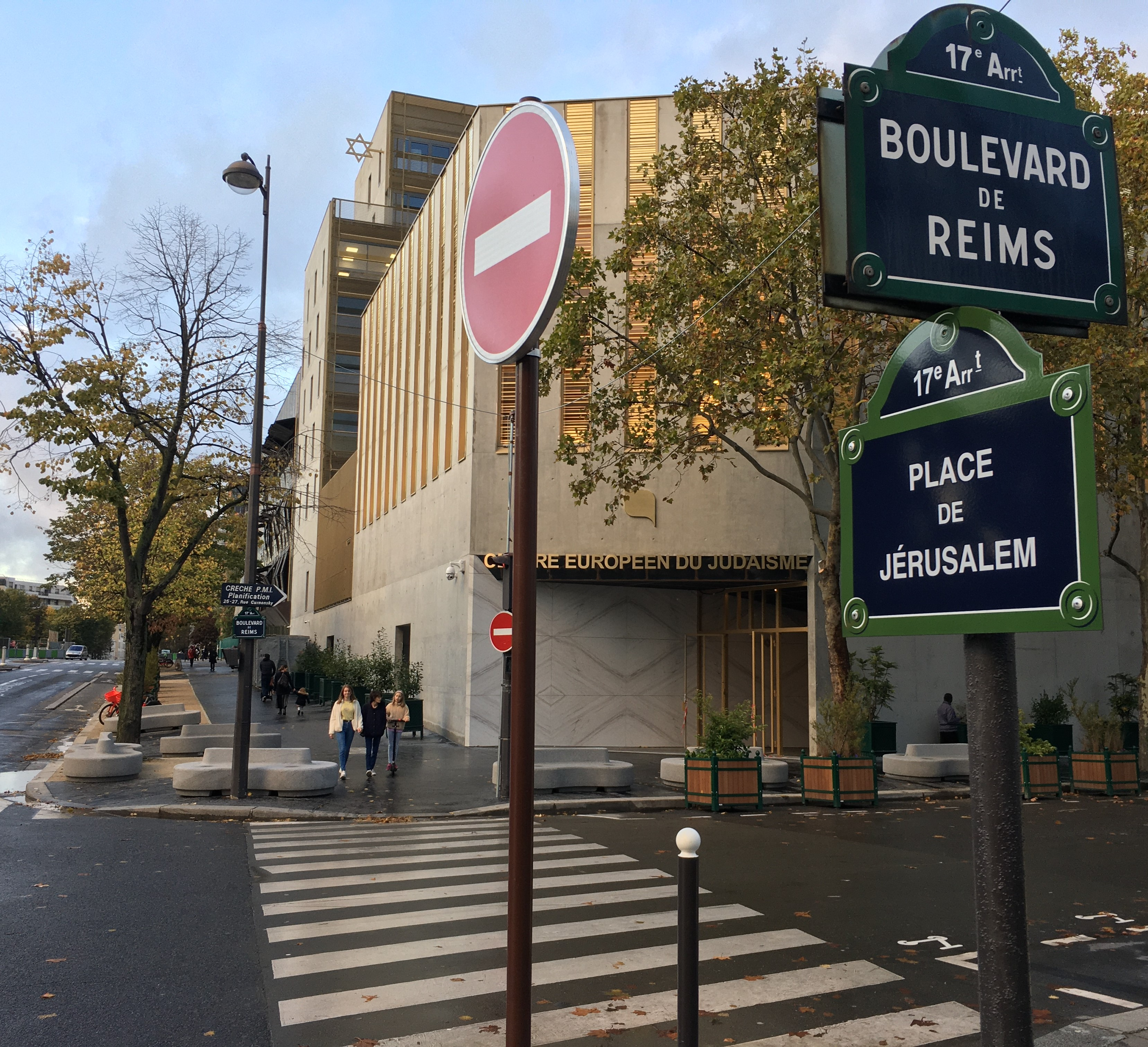
- Entrance to the center and synagogue

- Location of the centre and synagogue in Paris

Religion
- Affiliation: Judaism
- Ecclesiastical or organizational status: Synagogue
- Ownership: Israelite Central Consistory of France
- Status: Active

Location
- Location: Place de Jérusalem, XVIIe arrondissement, Paris
- Country: France
- Interactive map of Edmond J. Safra Synagogue
- Coordinates: 48°53′16″N 2°17′41″E

Architecture
- Completed: 2019
- Capacity: 430 seats

Website
- cejparis.com

The European Jewish Center is a Jewish cultural center and synagogue located at place de Jérusalem, in the XVIIe arrondissement of Paris, France. The project was conceived by Joël Mergui, president of the Israelite Central Consistory of France. Construction began in 2015 and the building was inaugurated on 29 October 2019 in the presence of Emmanuel Macron, the President of France.

The synagogue is called the Edmond J. Safra Synagogue, named in honour of Edmond Safra, a philanthropist, partially funded with the support of the Edmond J. Safra Philanthropic Foundation.

== The center ==
The center is located on Place de Jérusalem, at the corner of rue de Courcelles and boulevard de Reims in the XVIIe arrondissement; and is approximately 5,000 square metres (54,000 sq ft) in area. The building consists of

- The Edmond J. Safra Synagogue, a synagogue with 430 seats; and
- Two buildings of five and seven floors respectively, comprising offices and a 2,500-square-metre (27,000 sq ft) cultural center with performance and exhibition halls.

The project cost €15 million, of which €3 million was supported by State and region public funds, €5 million from foundations, €3 million patrons and private donors, with the remainder financed by loans. The City of Paris provided a 1,650-square-metre (17,800 sq ft) parcel of land to the Consistory for the project.

The closest Métro station to the building is at Porte de Champerret.

== See also ==
- History of the Jews in France
- List of synagogues in France
