= Caen Synagogue =

Synagogue in Caen, France

- French: Synagogue de Caen
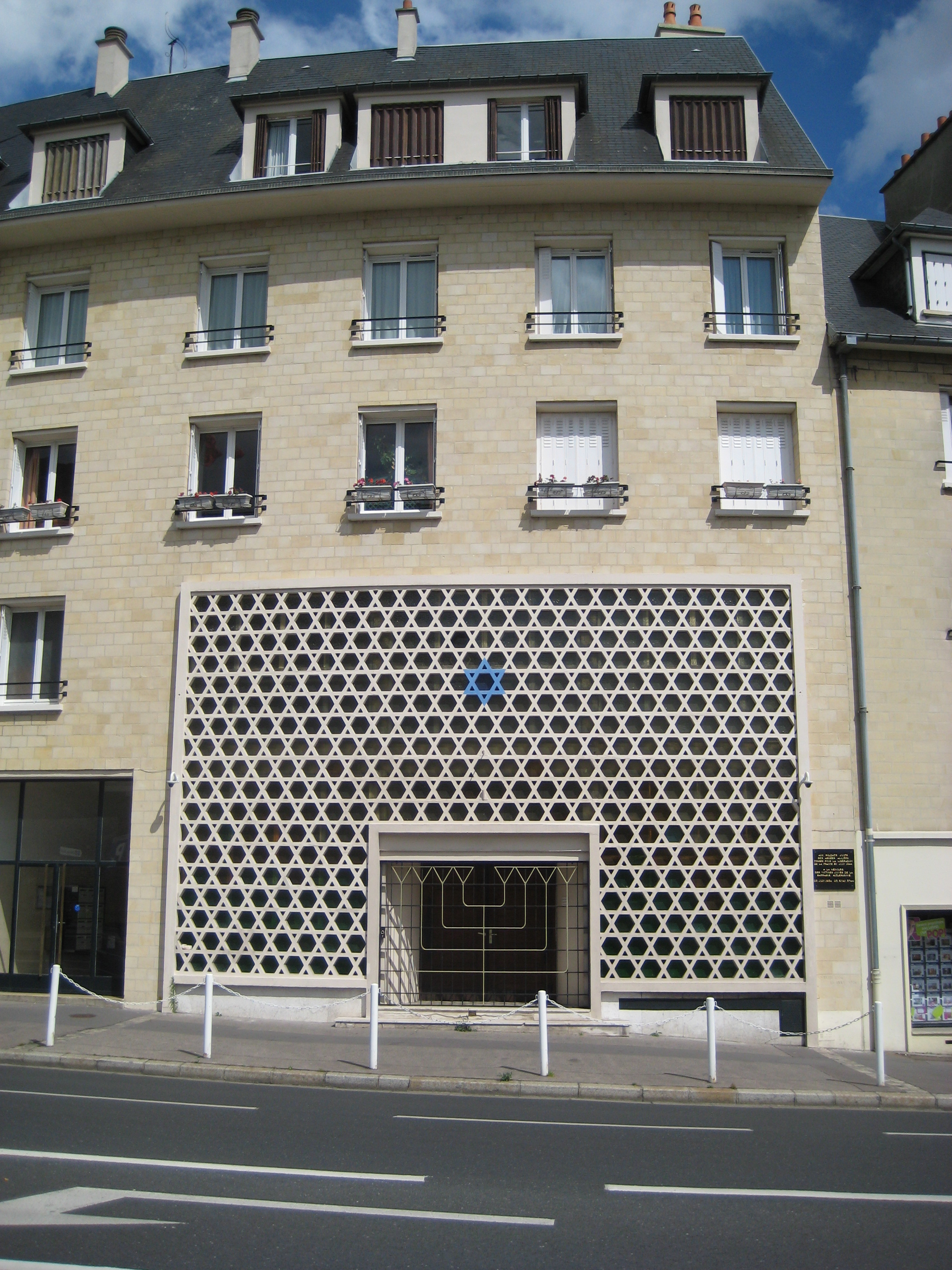
- The synagogue in 2008

- Location of the synagogue in France

Religion
- Affiliation: Judaism
- Rite: Nusach Ashkenaz
- Ecclesiastical or organizational status: Synagogue
- Status: Active

Location
- Location: 46 Avenue de la Libération, Caen, Calvados, Normandy
- Country: France
- Interactive map of Caen Synagogue
- Coordinates: 49°11′07″N 0°21′38″W

Architecture
- Architect: Guy Morizet
- Type: Synagogue architecture
- Established: c. 1960s (as a congregation)
- Completed: 1966
- Construction cost: FR20 million

The Caen Synagogue (French: Synagogue de Caen), officially Synagogue of the Hebrew Cultural Association, is a Jewish congregation and synagogue, located at 46 Avenue de la Libération, in Caen, Calvados, in the Normandy region of France. The president of the Israelite Cultural Association of Caen (ACI), who own the building, is Nassim Levy.

== History ==
Before the construction of the synagogue, Jews in Caen held services in different locations around the city, notably in community buildings or the musée Langlois. With the arrival of North African Jews in France following the Indépendance of Algeria, the local Jewish community, largely composed of Ashkenazi Jews, recognized the need for the construction of a dedicated place of worship.

The site chosen for the new synagogue was formerly a garage owned by a Jewish man deported during the Second World War. Seventy-five percent of the construction costs were covered by the American Jewish Joint Distribution Committee, at the time approximately FR20 million. The architect was Guy Morizet. The first stone was laid on April 30, 1964 and construction lasted a month. The synagogue was consecrated on May 23, 1966 in the presence of Jacob Kaplan, Chief Rabbi of France.

=== Since the year 2000 ===
In January 2006, anti-semitic leaflets were found near the entrance of the synagogue, making references to The Holocaust.

As of 2020, the community had about 150 families. Major renovations of the synagogue began in September 2020.

== See also ==
- History of the Jews in France
- List of synagogues in France
