= Château d'Ingwiller =

Historical former chateau, now synagogs, in Ingwiller, Alsace, France

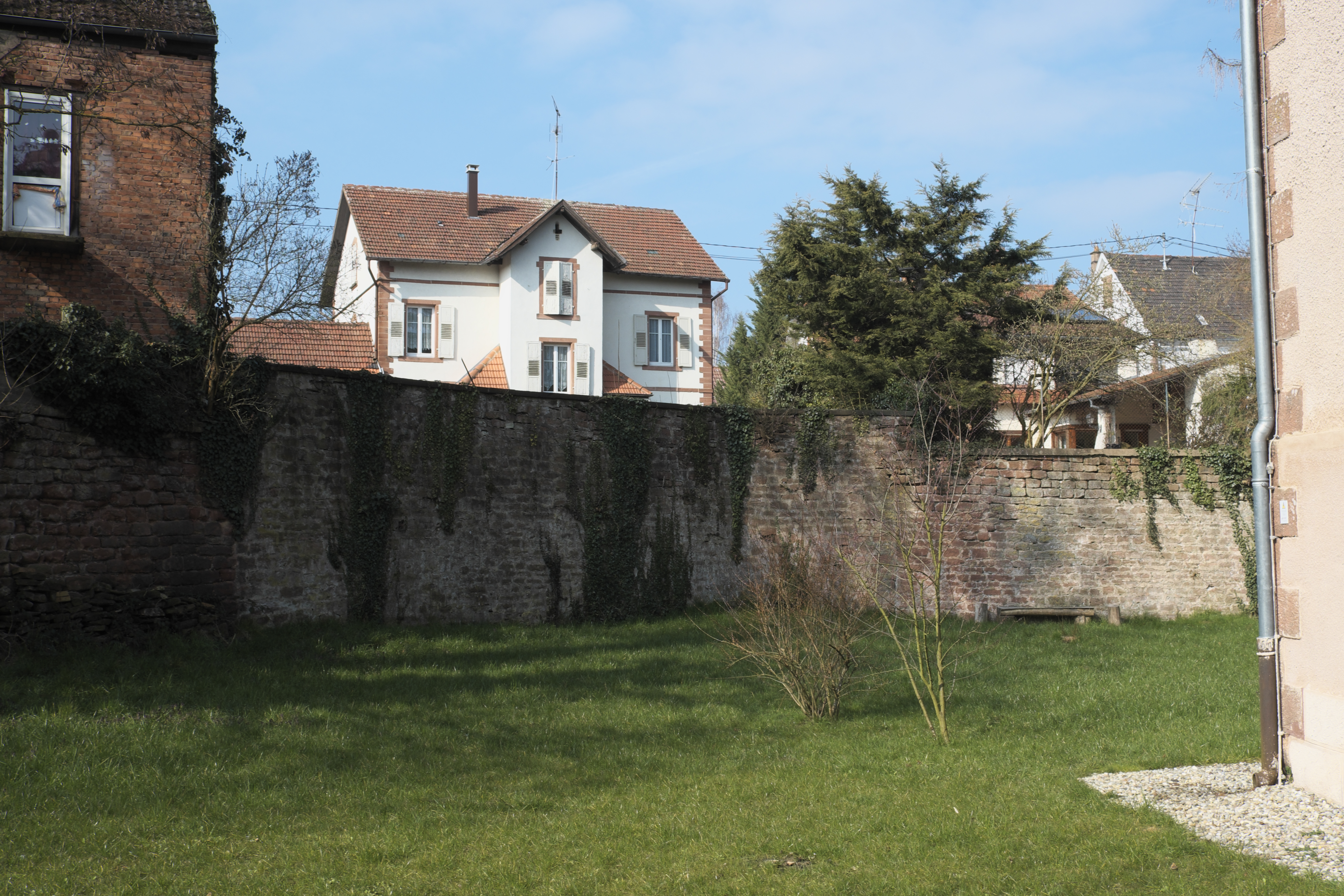
- Ramparts of the former château in 2016
- Interactive map of Château d'Ingwiller
- 48°52′22″N 7°28′44″E
- Type: Château (castle)
- Location: Ingwiller, Bas-Rhin, Alsace, France

History
- Formed: 14th century?
- Founder: House of Lichtenberg
- Original use: Residential
- Demolished: 1648
- Rebuilt: 1870 (as a synagogue)

Monument historique
- Official name: Château puis synagogue (in French)
- Type: Base Mérimée
- Designated: unknown
- Reference no.: IA67009766

Synagogue of Ingwiller
- French: Synagogue d'Ingwiller
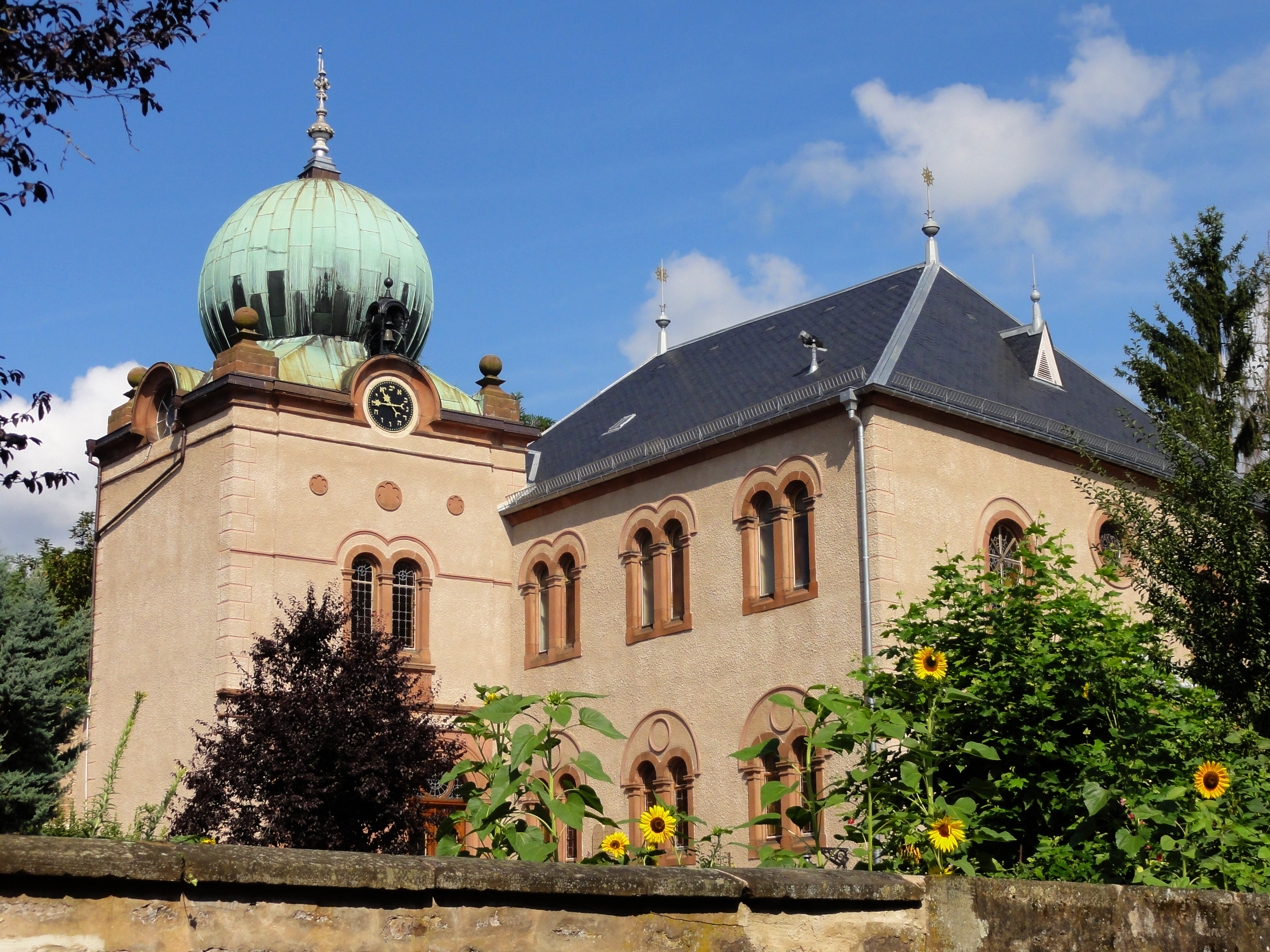
- The synagogue in 2016, sited on the foundations of the former château

Religion
- Affiliation: Judaism
- Ecclesiastical or organizational status: Synagogue and; Jewish museum
- Ownership: Jewish Consistoire of Bas-Rhin
- Status: Active

Location
- Location: 5 cour du Château, Ingwiller, Bas-Rhin, Alsace
- Country: France
- Interactive map of Synagogue of Ingwiller
- Coordinates: 48°52′22″N 7°28′44″E

Architecture
- Established: c. 1800s (as a congregation)
- Completed: 1870 (as a synagogue)

Specifications
- Dome: One
- Materials: Stone; copper

The Château d'Ingwiller was a castle located at Ingwiller, approximately 30 km (19 mi) west of Haguenau in Bas-Rhin, in the Alsace region of France. The castle, with a tower, which was built towards the end of the fourteenth century, no longer exists.

Extensively renovated several times, its purpose was more residential than military and in the end it did not survive the turbulent history of Alsace. By the end of the Thirty Years' War in 1648 much of the château was in ruins. During the nineteenth century the Ingwiller Jewish community built a synagogue on a part of what had been the château's foundations.

== History ==
The town received permission, directly or indirectly from the emperor, to erect town walls in 1346. It is likely that by this time a castle already existed at Ingwiller. However, the first unambiguous surviving record of the castle dates only from 1405. It was then renovated in 1472 by Jakobus ("James"), Count of Lichtenburg, according to a commemorative inscription now kept at the town hall. The count died at the castle on 5 January 1480, predeceasing his own son, Philippe, by just five days, triggering a period of funerals and some uncertainty. Title evidently passed to Philippe's seventeen year old son (also called Philippe). During the next century, in 1521 the third Count Philippe had a "golden chamber" installed at Ingwiller. During the Thirty Years' War (1618-1648) the château was extensively damaged, but not entirely destroyed. A source from 1680 mentions the particularly poor state in which the war had left the "golden chamber".

Of this ruined castle, today only a vaulted cellar and the remnants of a late medieval round tower remain. From these vestigial remnants it seems that in the seventeenth century the Château d'Ingwiller included several floors of living space. An inventory from 1624 refers to a considerable floor space, incorporating no fewer than 36 rooms. This is almost certainly a reference to the same originally fourteenth century edifice. During the seventeenth century the castle enclosure contained, along with the usual basics, an arsenal, an abattoir, a laundry, a bakery, stables, a barn and a shed.

In 1807 the castle and its outbuildings were gifted, by way of compensation, to the hospital of nearly Bouxwiller. In 1821 part of the ground formerly occupied by the castle was sold to the local Jewish community, and in 1822 a new meeting centre was built above the former castle cellar. This was formally converted into a synagogue in 1870, and then extensively refashioned in the early 1890s.

== Synagogue ==
The Synagogue of Ingwiller (French: Synagogue d'Ingwiller) is a square building set on a rectangular plan to the southwest of the former château site. The building is topped by a bulbous onion dome made of copper. The bays of the synagogue are semi-circular and twin-shaped and the front of the Torah is made of paired sandstone.\The tables of the Law are in relief on the south façade. In the northeast corner of the site, there is a house for the rabbi and several outbuildings surround the former moat.

The synagogue was ransacked by the Nazis during World War II. It was partially restored after the war for use by the small Jewish community. However, the community dwindled sharply over the next decades and the building fell into disuse and suffered damage from water infiltration and neglect. Following restoration in 2013 and 2014, the synagogue reopened, although, with a very small congregation, the building is used for cultural events and houses a small permanent exhibition about local Jewish history and heritage.

== See also ==
- History of the Jews in Alsace
- History of the Jews in France
- List of synagogues in France
