= Pauline Bebe =

French rabbi

Pauline Bebe is the rabbi of Communauté Juive Libérale, a Progressive Jewish congregation in Paris. She was the first female rabbi in France, and the first female rabbi to lead a synagogue there. As of 2018 France has only four women rabbis, Bebe, Célia Surget, Delphine Horvilleur and Floriane Chinsky.

== Early life ==
Bebe was born in 1965 in Neuilly-sur-Seine, France. Her family lived through the German occupation and hid in the south of France throughout World War II. Her father was a pediatrician and her mother a lawyer. They were both Jews who, though nonpracticing, exposed their child to the lessons of the rue Copernic synagogue: "They gave me the education which they could not get because of the war". Her desire to become a rabbi dates to her adolescence: "I wanted to be a rabbi to accompany people for the important periods of their life. The liberal Jewish movement lauded the equality between the man and the woman. I saw no obstacle to my desire..."

She attended the lycée Lamartine high school in the 9th arrondissement of Paris, taking classical studies. After graduation, she attended Institut national des langues et civilisations orientales at Paris, where she learned English and Hebrew. She has a BA in English and American literature and civilization, and an MA and DEA in Hebrew literature. Her Master's thesis was titled L'attitude du judaïsme face au prosélytisme et à la conversion ("The attitude of Judaism in the face of proselytism and conversion").

== Rabbinical education ==
In 1985, Bebe began her rabbinical studies in England with five years of studies at the Leo Baeck College. She stated "A liberal Rabbinical College in France does not exist, and I am attached to a Judaism based on the Enlightenment, to a religion which evolves according to periods and social circles."

She completed her Hebrew cursus in Jerusalem at the Hebrew Union College. She was ordained in 1990, one of about 30 women rabbis ordained by the Leo Baeck College between 1975 and 2006. Though less numerous than in the United States, female rabbis exist in Europe, mostly in England, Germany and Netherlands.

== Career ==
Bebe first rabbinic position was at Mouvement Juif Liberal de France in Paris between 1990 and 1995. She helped those with drug addiction, HIV-positive people and eccentrics who were rejected by the traditional religious institutions. Reactions to her as a female rabbi were mixed: "Some believers were very enthusiastic and trusted me, while others were violently opposed to the idea of having a woman rabbi."

In 1995 with Remy Schwartz, Bebe created her own congregation, Communaute Juive Liberale d'Île-de-France (CJL) in Paris. The congregation adopted the name MAAYAN (Hebrew for "wellspring"), and opened a new synagogue building in May 2006. By 2013, membership exceeded 400 households. The CJL is affiliated with the World Union for Progressive Judaism.

== Personal life ==
Bebe is married to Rabbi Tom Cohen, an American expatriate who leads Kehilat Gesher, the American Jewish Congregation in Paris. Bebe is also the mother of four children; she says, "It's not always easy to be everywhere at the same time, but for the moment at least, my children aren't complaining".

== Writings ==
Bebe is the author of seven books and has written numerous articles:

- Le Judaïsme libéral, Éditions Grancher, 1993, ISBN 2-7339-0416-7.
- ISHA, Dictionnaire des femmes et du judaïsme, Calmann-Lévy, 2001, ISBN 2-7021-3153-0
- Peut-on faire le bonheur de ses enfants ?, avec Caroline Eliacheff et Pierre Lassus, Éditions de l'Atelier, 2003, ISBN 2-7082-3696-2
- Qu'est-ce que le judaïsme libéral ?, Calmann-Lévy, 2006, ISBN 2-7021-3724-5
- A l'ombre du tamaris, Presses de la Renaissance, 2010, ISBN 978-2-7509-0610-8
- L'autre, cet infini, avec Catherine Bensaid, Éditions Robert Laffont, 2013, ISBN 978-2-221-10997-7

== Other ==
The 2022 art exhibit “Holy Sparks”, shown among other places at the Dr. Bernard Heller Museum, featured art about twenty-four female rabbis who were firsts in some way; Tamar Hirschl created the artwork about Bebe that was in that exhibit.

== See also ==
- Timeline of women rabbis

== Bibliography ==
- Pauline Bebe, Jewish Virtual Library
