= Schaffhouse-sur-Zorn =

- Part of Hochfelden
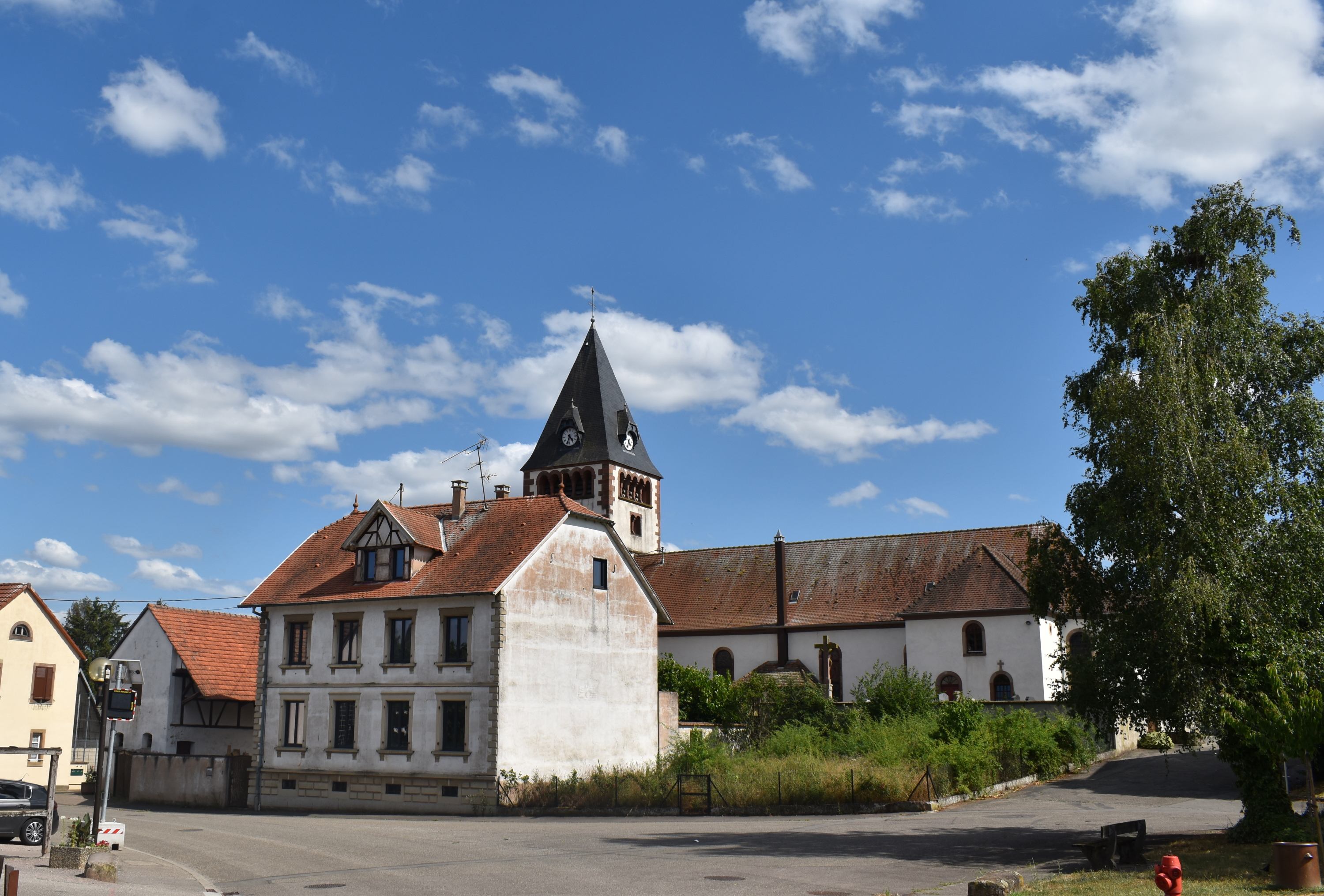
- Schaffhouse-sur-Zorn's Rue de l'Ecole, with the Saint-Sébastien church in the background

- Coat of arms
- Location of Schaffhouse-sur-Zorn
- Location within France Location within Grand Est
- Coordinates: 48°44′00″N 7°33′50″E
- Country: France
- Region: Grand Est
- Department: Bas-Rhin
- Arrondissement: Saverne
- Canton: Bouxwiller
- Commune: Hochfelden
- Area^{1}: 3.67 km^{2} (1.42 sq mi)
- Highest elevation: 214 m (702 ft)
- Lowest elevation: 158 m (518 ft)
- Population (2023): 385
  - Density: 105/km^{2} (272/sq mi)
- Time zone: UTC+01:00 (CET)
  - Summer (DST): UTC+02:00 (CEST)
- Postal code: 67270
- ^{1} French Land Register data, which excludes lakes, ponds, glaciers > 1 km^{2} (0.386 sq mi or 247 acres) and river estuaries.

Schaffhouse-sur-Zorn (German: Schaffhausen an der Zorn, Alsatian: Schàffhüse) is a former commune in the Bas-Rhin department in Grand Est in north-eastern France. On 1 January 2017, it was merged into the commune Hochfelden.

== See also ==
- Communes of the Bas-Rhin department
