= Synagogue of Vesoul =

Former synagogue in Vesoul, France

Vesoul Synagogue
- French: Synagogue de Vesoul
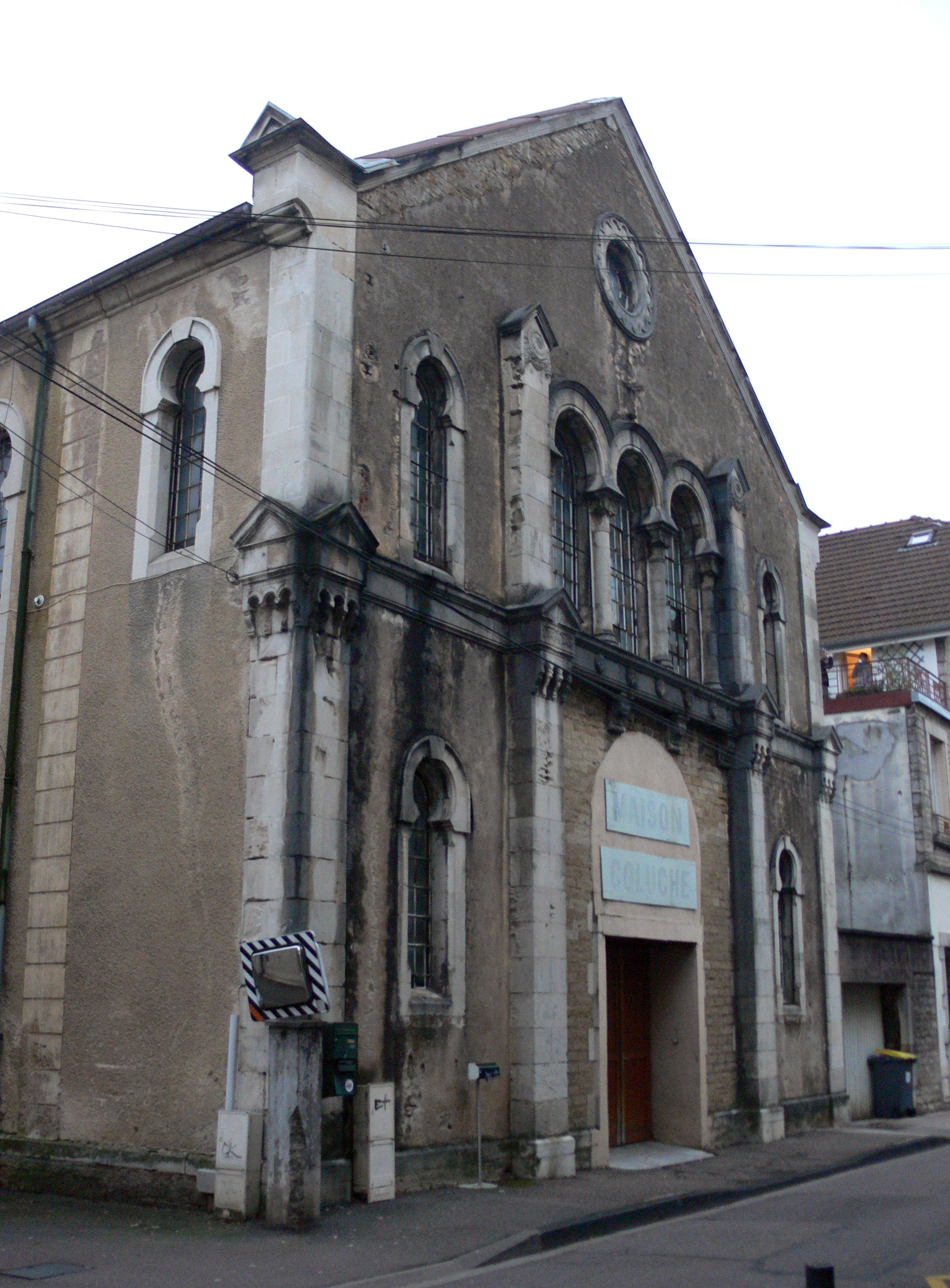
- The former synagogue in [YYYY]

- Location of the former synagogue in France

Religion
- Affiliation: Judaism (former)
- Rite: Nusach Ashkenaz
- Ecclesiastical or organizational status: Synagogue (1875–2011)
- Status: Abandoned; sold

Location
- Location: 11 rue du Moulin-des-Prés, Vesoul, Haute-Saône, Bourgogne-Franche-Comté
- Country: France
- Interactive map of Vesoul Synagogue
- Coordinates: 47°37′16″N 6°09′26″E

Architecture
- Architect: Charles Dodelier
- Type: Synagogue architecture
- Established: [YYYY] (as a congregation)
- Completed: 1875
- Materials: Stone

Monument historique
- Official name: Synagogue (ancienne) (in French)
- Type: Base Mérimée
- Criteria: Patrimoine architectural (Mérimée) (in French)
- Designated: December 5, 1984
- Reference no.: PA00102293

The Synagogue of Vesoul (French: Synagogue de Vesoul) is a former Jewish congregation and synagogue, located at 11 rue du Moulin-des-Prés, in the city of Vesoul, in Haute-Saône department of the Bourgogne-Franche-Comté region of France. Whilst active, the congregation worshipped in the Ashkenazi rite.

The building was erected in 1875 and classified as a monument historique on December 5, 1984. In 2011 the organization that owned the building, Les Restos du Coeur, decided to sell it.

== See also ==
- History of the Jews in France
- List of synagogues in France
