= Saint-Avold Synagogue =

Synagogue in Saint-Avold, France

- French: Synagogue de Saint-Avold
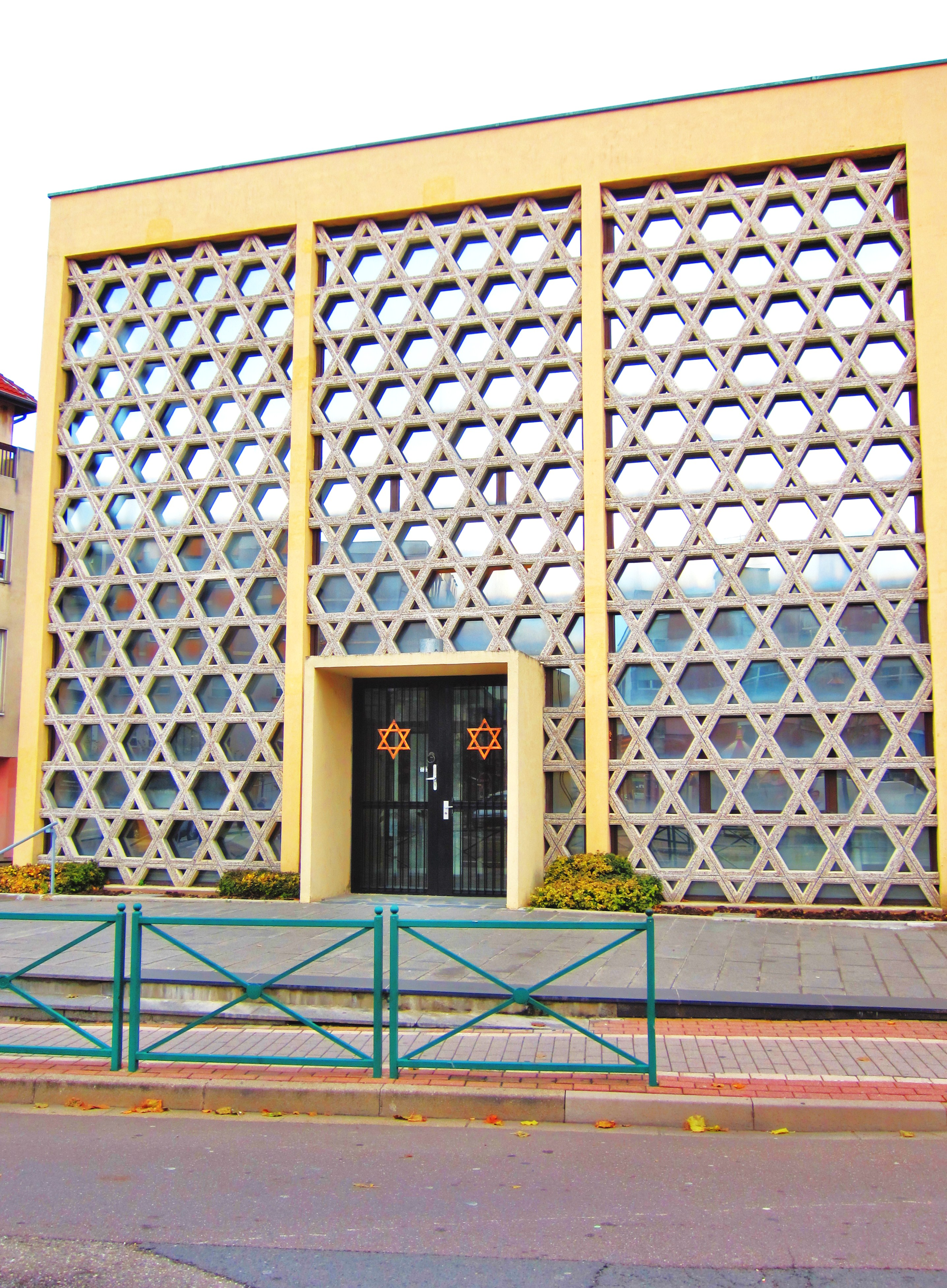
- The synagogue entrance in 2012

- Location of the synagogue in France

Religion
- Affiliation: Judaism
- Rite: Nusach Ashkenaz
- Ecclesiastical or organizational status: Synagogue
- Status: Active

Location
- Location: Cnr. Rue des Americains and Rue de la Mertzelle, Saint-Avold Moselle, Grand Est
- Country: France
- Interactive map of Saint-Avold Synagogue
- Coordinates: 49°06′17″N 6°42′33″E

Architecture
- Architect: Roger Zonca
- Type: Synagogue architecture
- Style: Modernist
- Established: 1660s (as a congregation)
- Completed: 1956
- Materials: Brick

The Saint-Avold Synagogue (French: Synagogue de Saint-Avold) is a Jewish congregation and synagogue, located at the corner of Rue des Americains and Rue de la Mertzelle near Place Paul-Collin in Saint-Avold, in the Moselle department in Grand Est in north-eastern France. The current synagogue building, completed in 1956, replaces a nearby synagogue destroyed during the German occupation of France in World War II.

The congregation worships in the Ashkenazi rite.

== History ==
The presence of a synagogue in this part of Moselle dates from the 1660s, when an ordinance by the local episcopate mentioned the existence of a synagogue in the area.

One old synagogue was conducting services as early as 1817, when the local businessman who they rented a building from sold the house.

A burned building situated on Rue des Anges was then acquired by David Elli, Salomon Nathan and Salomon Friburg, members of the Jewish community of Saint-Avold, and restored by them. One of the floors in the building was then used by the community to serve as a synagogue in June 1824.

A new synagogue was constructed in the place of this building in 1825 on orders by the Prefecture. Despite the risk of financial ruin, the synagogue was reconstructed between 1858 and 1860 with the help of a grant by Mayor Charles Joseph Spinga. The architect of the building's façade was Jeannin. In 1871, the Rabbinic authority of Saint-Avold was reorganized by Imperial German authorities and divided into two separate Rabbinates: one in Boulay and one in Saint-Avold. After World War I and the return of Alsace-Moselle to France, the community lost several German members. The synagogue was renovated between 1922 and 1923. The newly renovated synagogue hosted the inauguration of Nathan Netter, the Chief Rabbi of Metz, on April 19, 1923. Ransacked and desecrated by the Nazis in 1940, it was turned into a firehouse, and later destroyed.

In 1956 the current synagogue was built a few meters from the previous location. Designed by architect Roger Zonca and Studio Constructa, it is located at the corner of Rue des Americains and Rue de la Mertzelle near Place Paul-Collin. During the European Days of Jewish Culture, the synagogue served as a concert space. The new synagogue was vandalized and set on fire on August 31, 1992, but was carefully restored.

== See also ==
- History of the Jews in France
- List of synagogues in France

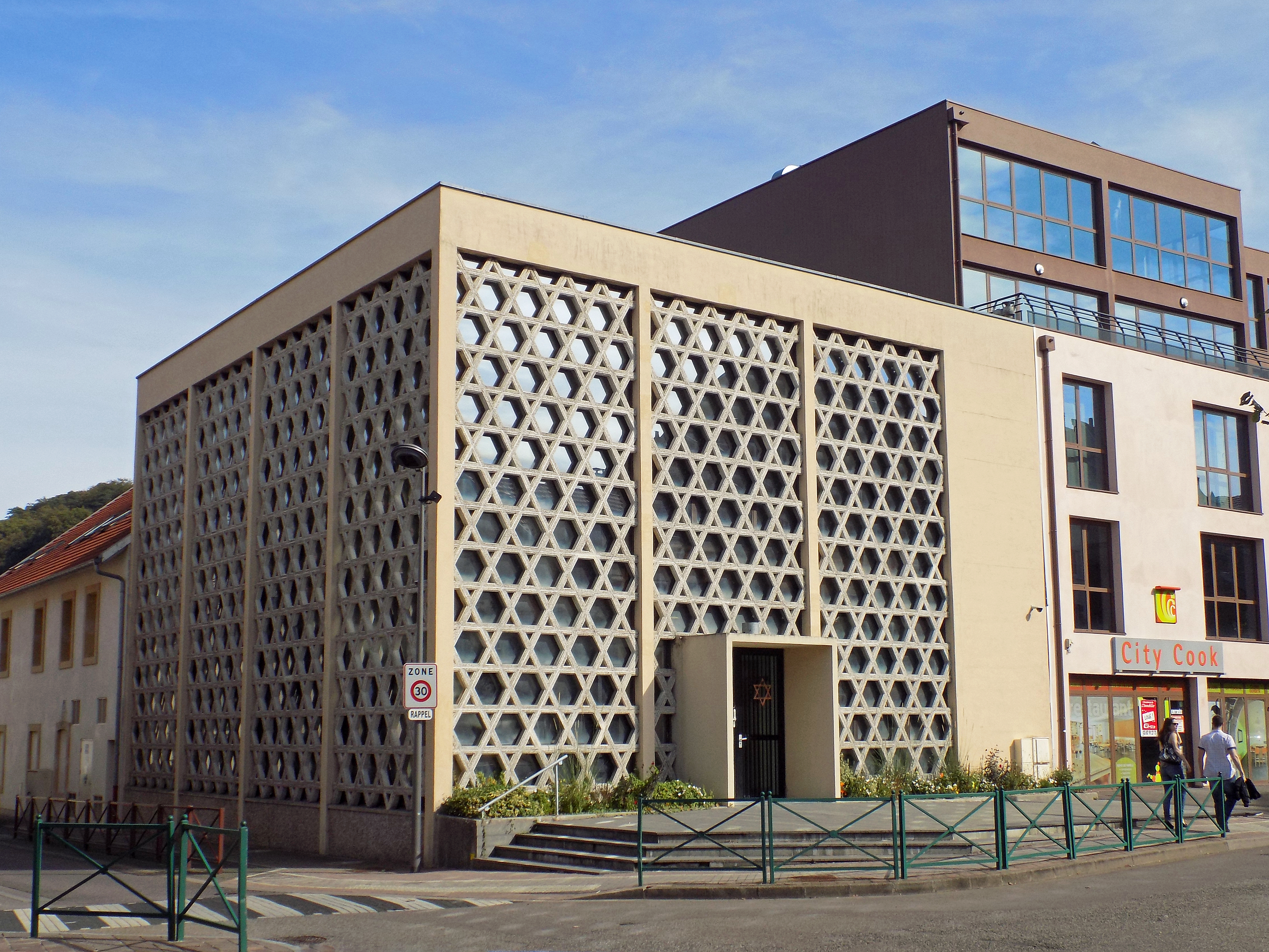
The 1956 synagogue
