= Rouen Synagogue =

Orthodox synagogue in Rouen, France

- French: Synagogue de Rouen
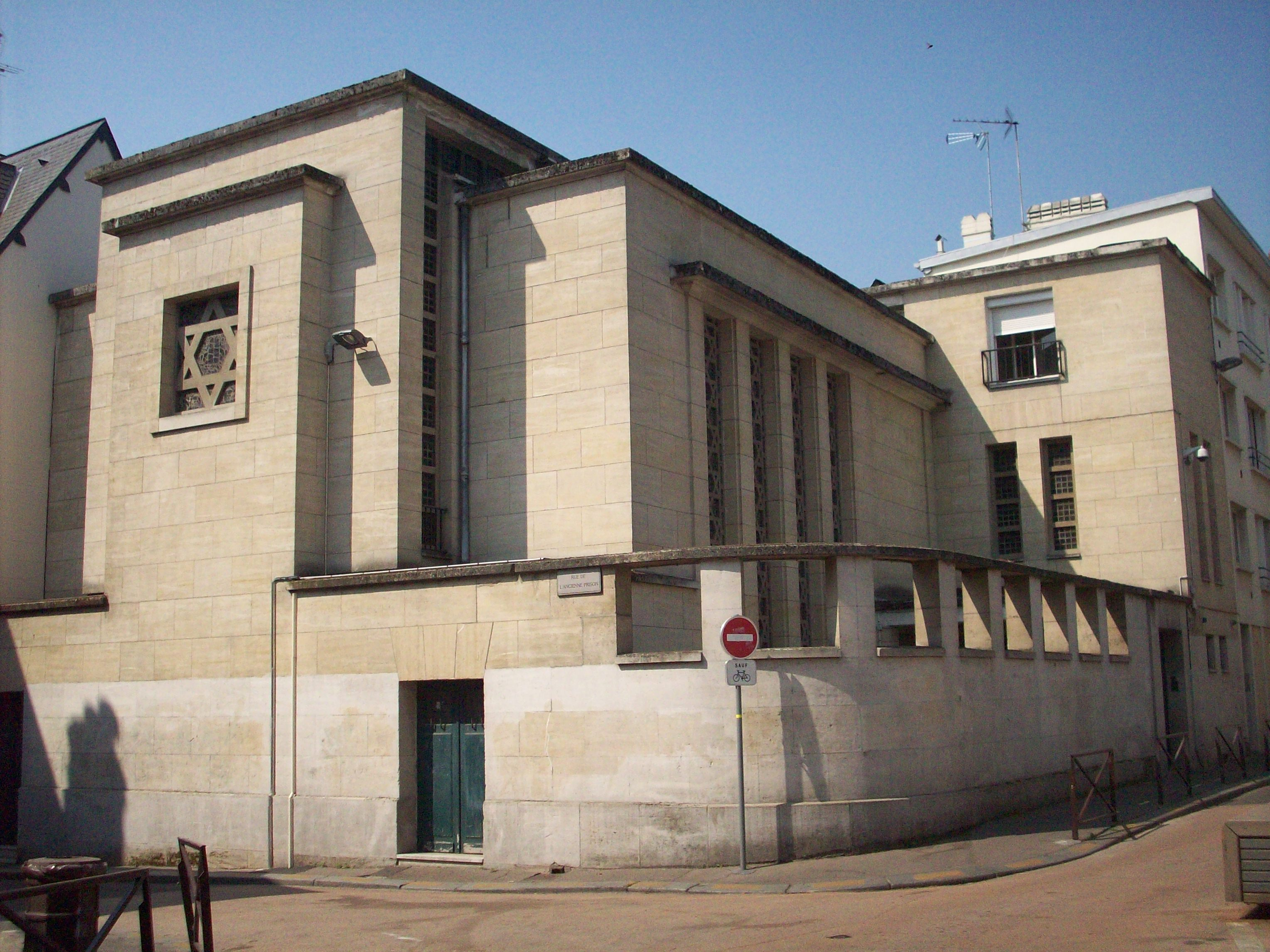
- The synagogue in 2011

- Location of the synagogue in France

Religion
- Affiliation: Orthodox Judaism
- Rite: Nusach Sefard
- Ecclesiastical or organisational status: Synagogue
- Status: Active

Location
- Location: 55 rue des Bons-Enfants, Rouen, Normandy
- Country: France
- Coordinates: 49°26′40″N 1°05′21″E

Architecture
- Type: Synagogue architecture
- Established: 14th-century (as a congregation)
- Completed: 1950

The Rouen Synagogue (French: Synagogue de Rouen) is an Orthodox Jewish congregation and synagogue, located at 55 rue des Bons-Enfants in Rouen, in the region of Normandy, France. The congregation is affiliated with the Israelite Central Consitory of France, and worships in the Sephardic rite.

== History ==
In the Middle Ages, two main streets divided the city of Rothomagus (modern day Rouen): the north–south cardo (today rue des Carmes) and the east–west decumanus (today rue du Gros-Horloge). The Jewish road or Vicus judaeorum, about 300 metres (980 ft) long, was found in the northwest portion of the city, parallel to the decumanus neighborhood. This street, mentioned in the 1116 Les Annales de Rouen, was the center of the neighborhood known as the terra judaeorum (Jewish land). It was not until after the expulsion of the Jews in 1306 that the "Jewish Square", which was in the center of the neighborhood, would be called the "Jewish Enclosure". During this time, the neighborhood measured about 28,500 m^{2} (307,000 sq ft), about one-twelfth of the city's area.

Situated in the heart of the city, the neighborhood was inhabited by a Jewish population that numbered about 5,000 to 6,000 people, or about 15–20% of the total population by the end of the 13th century, just before the expulsion by Philip IV.

The cemetery was situated outside the city walls, beyond what is now boulevard de la Marne and heading toward Mont-Saint-Aignan. Called the "cimetière as Juieulz" or the Mons Judaeorum, the term was used often by Jewish cemeteries in Europe during the Middle Ages. Its area (about 2 ha (4.9 acres)) highlighted the important of the city's Jewish community (compared to the 2.5 hectares (6.2 acres) for the Jewish cemetery of Cologne).

=== Medieval synagogues ===
A primitive synagogue on the edge of what is now Rue du Gros-Horloge, was destroyed in a pogrom that ravaged through the Jewish quarter at the start of the First Crusade in 1096 and was replaced by the Notre-Dame-de-la-Ronde Church, whose existence has been attested since at least 1255.

Shortly afterward, a new building was constructed about 100 metres (330 ft) from there, almost at the corner of Rue aux Juifs (at Rue No. 55) and Rue des Boucheries Massacre (today Rue Massacre). The circular tower that flanked the building was represented in the 1525 book the Livre des fontaines de Rouen by Jacques Le Lieur. The synagogue was mentioned in the 1782 second plan for the city of Rouen, drawn up in the 12th and 14th centuries by Rondeaux de Sétry, president of the Academy of Sciences, Belles-Lettres and Arts of Rouen, then described in 1821 by historian Eustache de la Quérière as a Romanesque style grand pavilion, almost square, half-buried, with two vaulted floors. These architectural aspects were seen in an architectural drawing from the 18th century conserved by the Archives départementales de la Seine-Maritime entitled Pignon de la synagogue.

The 1738 plans by Vernisse show a horizontal representation of the building. In the wall was a curved apse which held the Torah scrolls, as was the trend in all Romanesque synagogues. The entrance of the building was on the western side, in accordance with Rabbinic law while congregants faced the opposite wall for prayer.

The walls were 2 m (6 ft 7 in) thick, which suggests that the building was tall. Two large windows adorned the western and southern walls of the building to let in light, according to Talmudic tradition. Historian Eustache de la Quérière describes that fragments of a painting could be seen on the top of one of the vaulted ceilings, suggesting the existence of a Fresco.

Shortly after the destruction of the building in 1886, archivist Charles de Beaurepaire indicated in an article for the Bulletin de la Commission des antiquités de la Seine-Inférieure (1891–1893) that "the structure of the walls and even more the height of this vault presented something extraordinary, and it is a matter of regret for me that we have not recorded its exact dimensions, that we have not point taken a drawing for the Commission des Antiquités of the département". Thankfully, this drawing exists, as Gaston Barbier de la Serre drew a picture of the building at the time of its destruction.

=== Synagogue in the former Saint-Marie-la-Petite church (1869–1944) ===
At the end of 1869, the Jewish community of Rouen met in the former Sainte-Marie-la-Petite church, renamed to distinguish it from Notre-Dame Cathedral in Rouen and the Notre-Dame-de-la-Ronde church, which was also dedicated to the Virgin Mary. Deconsecrated as a church and sold during the French Revolution, the church was being used as a warehouse and later a school before being assigned to the Jewish community in 1865 as a place of worship. Having become a synagogue, it was closed by the Nazi Germany during the first days of the German occupation of France and served as an aid station

On May 31, 1944, an English high-powered bomb almost entirely destroyed the building and most of medical staff and the wounded who had taken refuge inside the building died. Only the porch remained but it too was razed in December 1946 during post-war reconstruction of the city.

=== New synagogue (1950) ===
Designed by François Herr, the new synagogue was built in the place of the old one, at the corner of Rues des Bons-Enfants and Rue Ancienne-Prison. The building was completed on December 17, 1950. The building was quadrangular in design and closed off to the north by a low wall.

The main façade consists of a primary building with a large entrance level porch is attached. This façade includes a door to the west and four high rectangular bays. The rear façade near Rue de l'Ancienne-Prison is composed of an overhang with a square bay with a Star of David. The windows form patterns with the Star of David and the Ten Commandments, and are signed by noted stained glass artist Gabriel Loire.

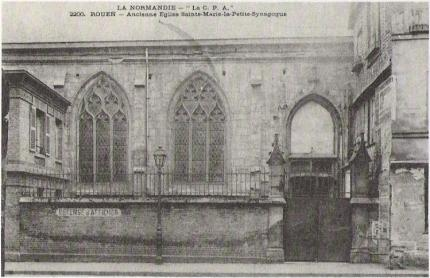
Synagogue de Rouen (ancienne église Sainte-Marie-la-Petite), 55 rue des Bons-Enfants.

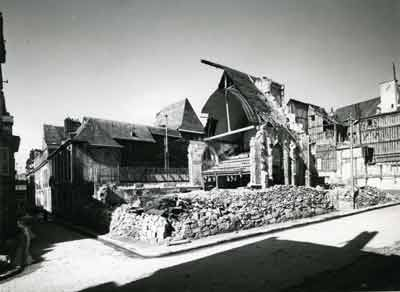
Synagogue (ex-église Sainte-Marie-la-Petite) après bombardement de 1944.

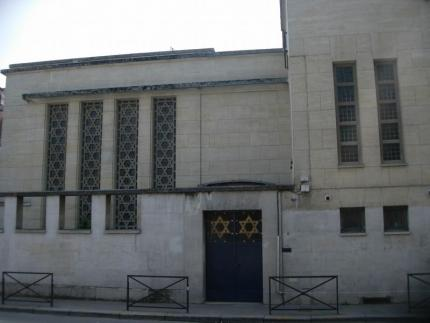
Synagogue actuelle de Rouen, façade rue des Bons-Enfants

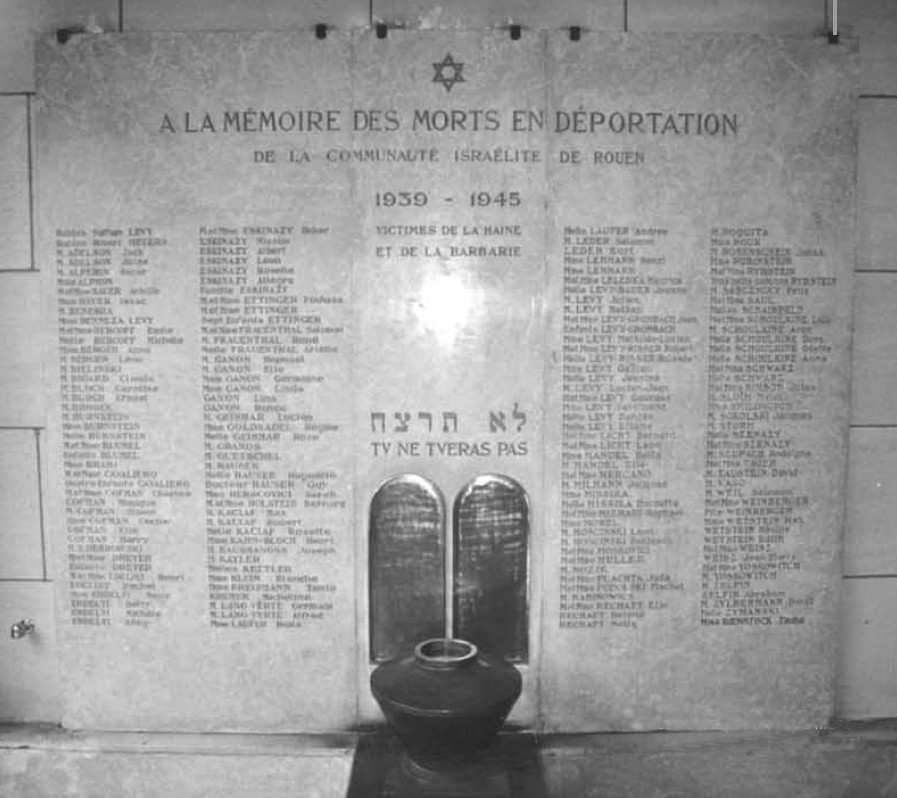
Commemorative plaque at the Rouen Synagogue for the victims of the deportation

=== Modern day ===
Toward the middle of the 19th century, the Jewish community in Rouen had about 300 members.

In the beginning days of the Occupation, the situation for Jews in Rouen and surrounding regions became progressively worse. Arrests and deportations began in 1940. Two factors explained the cruelty and efficiency of the persecution: the Germans considered the region, near the coasts and the English Channel, a strategic area; and a section of the police who were designated by the Vichy regime to deal with the Jewish question in Rouen. Thus, the Jewish community in Rouen had a heavier loss of life (about 500 victims, nearly 90% of the Jews present in 1939) than the Jewish population in France in general (where the percentage of victims killed is estimated at 25%).

The modern community is composed primarily of Sephardic Jews from North Africa. The community stood at about 250 families (approximately 700 people) in 2016.

A commemorative plaque is located at the entrance of the building paying tribute to members of the city's Jewish community who were killed and deported during The Holocaust.

==== Exhibit ====
Following the reopening of a Jewish monument in Rouen called the "Maison sublime" in 2018, the Antiquities Museum of Rouen organized an exhibit entitled "Savants and Believers: The Jews of Northern Europe in the Middle Ages" chronicling the intellectual life and material culture of Jews in the Middle Ages.

==== 2024 attempted arson ====
On May 17, 2024, an individual armed with a knife and an iron bar attempted to set the synagogue on fire before attacking a police officer who had been called to the scene. It was later announced that the man was killed by the police.

== See also ==
- History of the Jews in France
- List of synagogues in France
- List of attacks on Jewish institutions
