= Synagogue Keren Or =

Reform synagogue in Lyon, France

- Hebrew: קרן אור
- Location of the synagogue in the Auvergne-Rhône-Alpes region

Religion
- Affiliation: Reform Judaism
- Ecclesiastical or organisational status: Synagogue
- Leadership: Rabbi René Pfertzel; Rabbi Haïm Casas; Rabbi Daniela Touati
- Status: Active

Location
- Location: 15 Rue Jules Vallès, Villeurbanne, Lyon, Auvergne-Rhône-Alpes
- Country: France
- Coordinates: 45°46′11″N 4°51′53″E

Architecture
- Type: Synagogue architecture
- Established: 1990 (as a congregation)
- Completed: 2015 (current location)

Website
- kerenor.fr (in French)

Keren Or Synagogue (Hebrew: קרן אור, lit. 'Ray of Light') is a Reform Jewish congregation and synagogue, located at 15 Rue Jules Vallès in Villeurbanne, in Lyon, in the Auvergne-Rhône-Alpes region of France.

== History ==
In 1981 the Liberal Israelite Community of Lyon (Communauté libérale israélite de Lyon (CLIL)) was founded. It closed four years later in 1985. In 1990, the community was relaunched as a Reform community, taking the name the Liberal Jewish Community (Communauté juive libérale (CJL)). It was supported by Rabbi François GaraÏ of the Liberal Jewish Community of Geneva and Rabbi Daniel Farhi of the Mouvement juif libéral de France. In September 2001, the synagogue hired its first rabbi and by 2002 had nearly 180 families and was holding services at 7 quai Jean-Moulin.

In 2012, the community merged with the Liberal Jewish Union of Lyon (l'Union juive libérale de Lyon (UJLL)) and the synagogue was renamed Keren Or. In September 2015, the synagogue moved to its current location on rue Jules Vallès in Villeurbanne.

The community celebrated its thirtieth anniversary in 2020 and views itself as a modern, inclusive congregation. It supports gender equality, and is open to interfaith dialogue. The synagogue focuses on study of the Talmud Torah, along with contemporary research on historical criticism of the Bible.

== Beliefs ==
=== Marriage ===
The synagogue has an inclusive vision and celebrates both opposite-sex marriages and same-sex marriages.

== Clergy ==
The congregation is led by Rabbi René Pfertzel, installed in December 2017, and Rabbi Haïm Casas, a Sephardic Jew from Cordoba, Spain. Following her studies at Leo Baeck College in London, in July 2019 Rabbi Daniela Touati, an Ashkenazi Jew from Romania joined the congregation.

== See also ==
- History of the Jews in France
- List of synagogues in France
