= Hochfelden synagogue =

Historic synagogue in Bas-Rhin, France

- French: Synagogue de Hochfelden
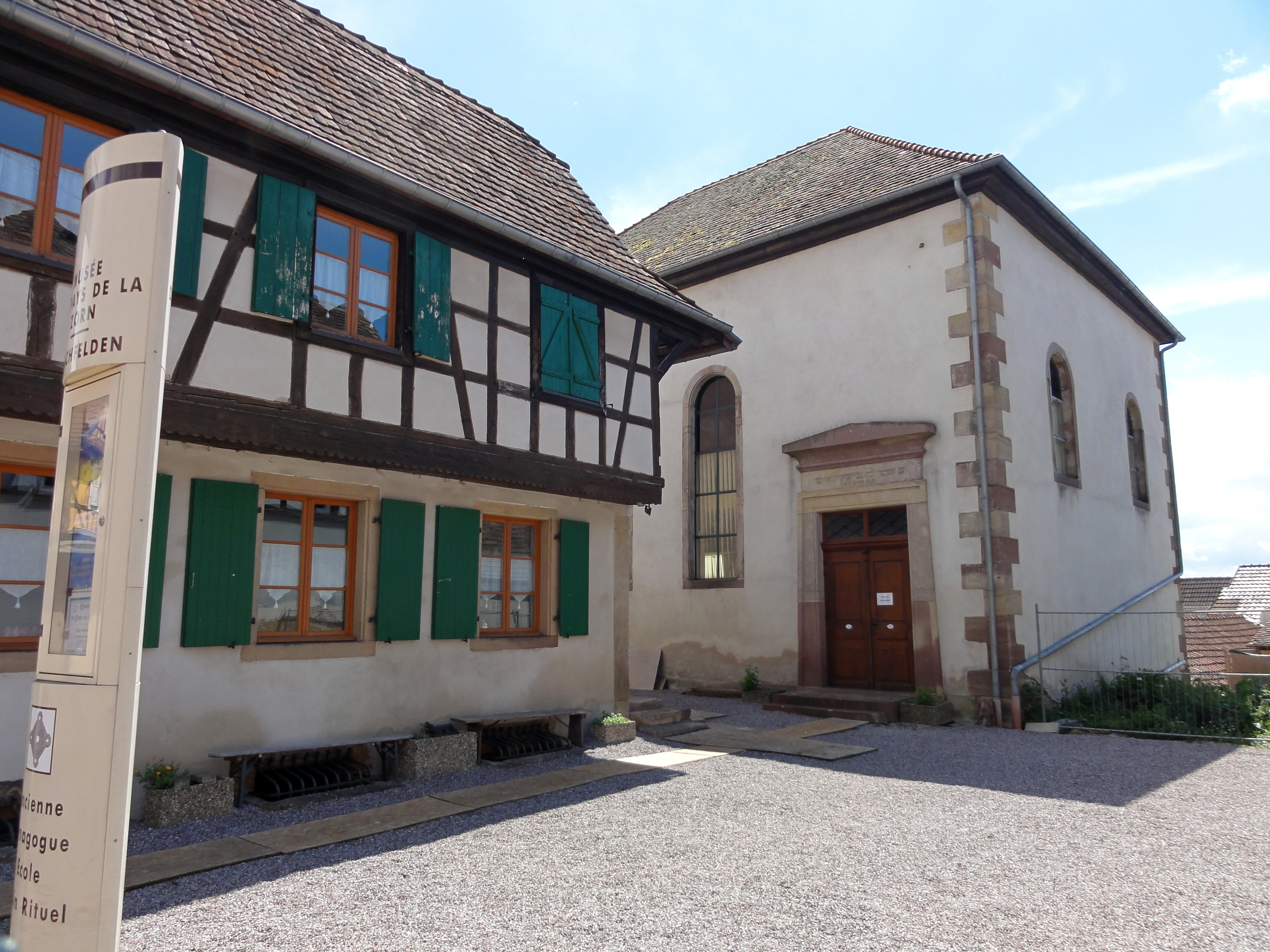
- The synagogue in 2014

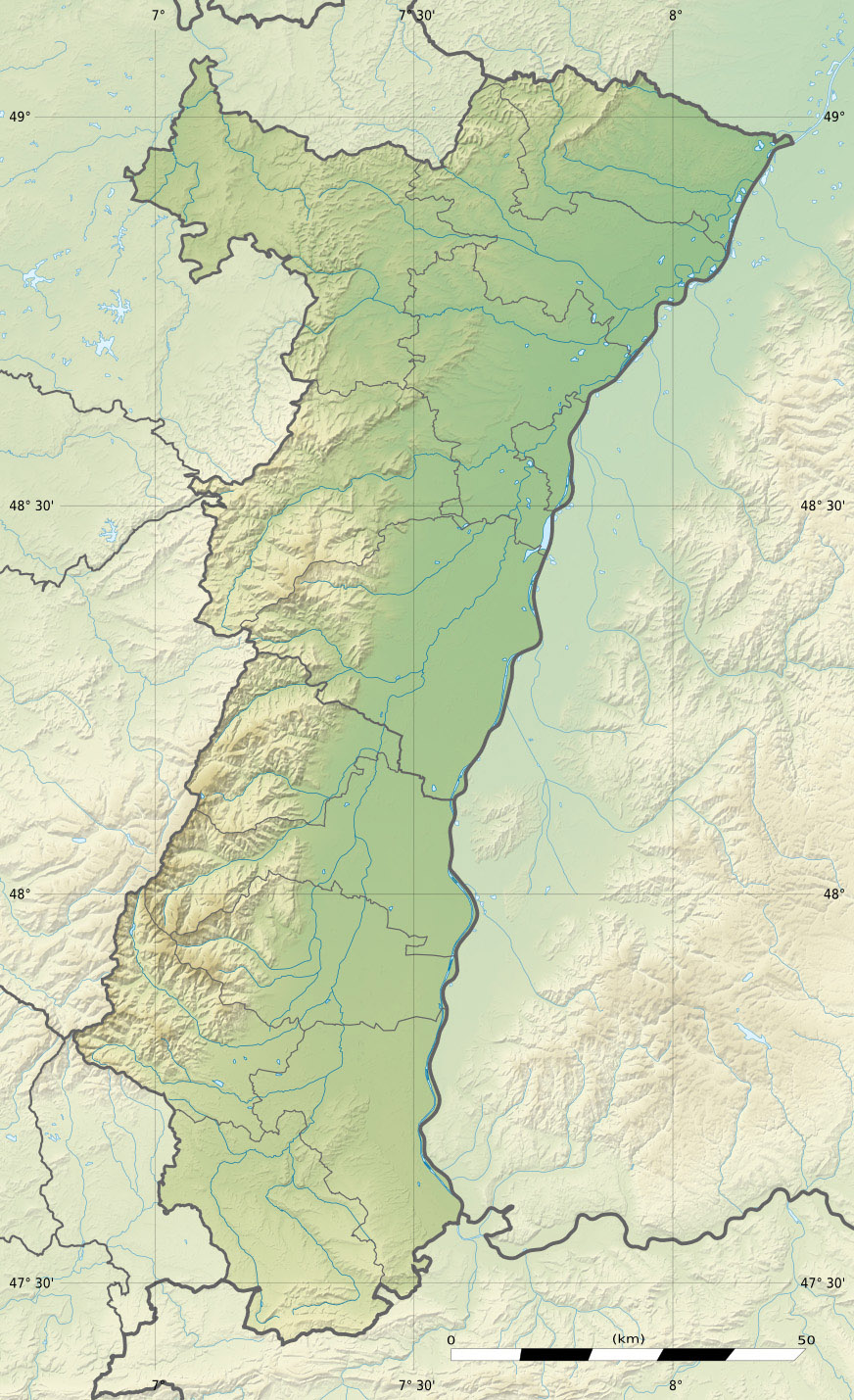
- Location of the synagogue in Alsace, France

Religion
- Affiliation: Judaism
- Rite: Nusach Ashkenaz
- Ecclesiastical or organizational status: Synagogue and; Jewish museum
- Status: Active

Location
- Location: 10-12 Général Koenig Square, Hochfelden, Bas-Rhin, Alsace
- Country: France
- Interactive map of Hochfelden synagogue
- Coordinates: 48°45′28″N 7°34′8″E

Architecture
- Type: Synagogue architecture
- Style: Baroque Revival
- Completed: 1841

Monument historique
- Official name: Synagogue de Hochfelden
- Type: Base Mérimée
- Designated: 10 April 1996
- Reference no.: PA67000004

The Hochfelden synagogue (French: Synagogue de Hochfelden), is a Jewish synagogue and museum, located at 10–12 Général Koenig Square, in Hochfelden, in the departement of Bas-Rhin, in the Alsace region of France.

== History ==
During the 17th century there was a synagogue nearby the current location. However it fell out of use and a new building in the Baroque Revival style was completed in 1841; and renovated in 1893. The synagogue was listed as a monument historique on 10 April 1996.

On 10 January 1799 the municipal government publicly condemned the practice of attending synagogue.

The synagogue also holds a now-defunct Jewish school.

== See also ==
- History of the Jews in Alsace
- History of the Jews in France
- List of synagogues in France
