= Adath Shalom Synagogue =

Conservative Massorti synagogue in Paris, France

- Location in Paris, France

Religion
- Affiliation: Conservative Judaism
- Rite: Masorti movement
- Ecclesiastical or organizational status: Synagogue
- Status: Active

Location
- Location: 8 Rue Georges-Bernard-Shaw, 15th arrondissement, Paris
- Country: France
- Interactive map of Adath Shalom Synagogue
- Coordinates: 48°51′08″N 2°17′35″E

Architecture
- Established: 1989 (as a congregation)

Website
- adathshalom.org

Adath Shalom Synagogue (transliterated from Hebrew as "Assembly of Peace") is a Masorti Jewish synagogue located on 8 Rue Georges-Bernard-Shaw in the XVe arrondissement of Paris, France.

== History ==
The congregation was established in 1989. In 1991, Rivon Krygier became the rabbi of the congregation.

The community identifies with the Masorti movement, or Conservative Judaism, which attempts to bridge modernity (like Reform Judaism) and a respect for tradition (like Orthodox Judaism). There is and equal role for men and women, and the community is invested in Interfaith dialogue with the group Vivre Ensemble in Paris' 15th arrondissement.

In 2004, the synagogue founded a satellite location, originally named Adath Shalom East. This location was renamed Dor V'Dor (Generation to Generation in Hebrew) in 2013. This location is at 10 rue du Cambodge in the 20th arrondissement. Their Rabbi is Yeshaya Dalsace.

In 2008, Adath Shalom had 300 families as members. It is the largest Masorti community in France.

== See also ==
- History of the Jews in France
- List of synagogues in France
