= Sedan Synagogue =

Synagogue in Sedan, France

- French: Synagogue de Sedan
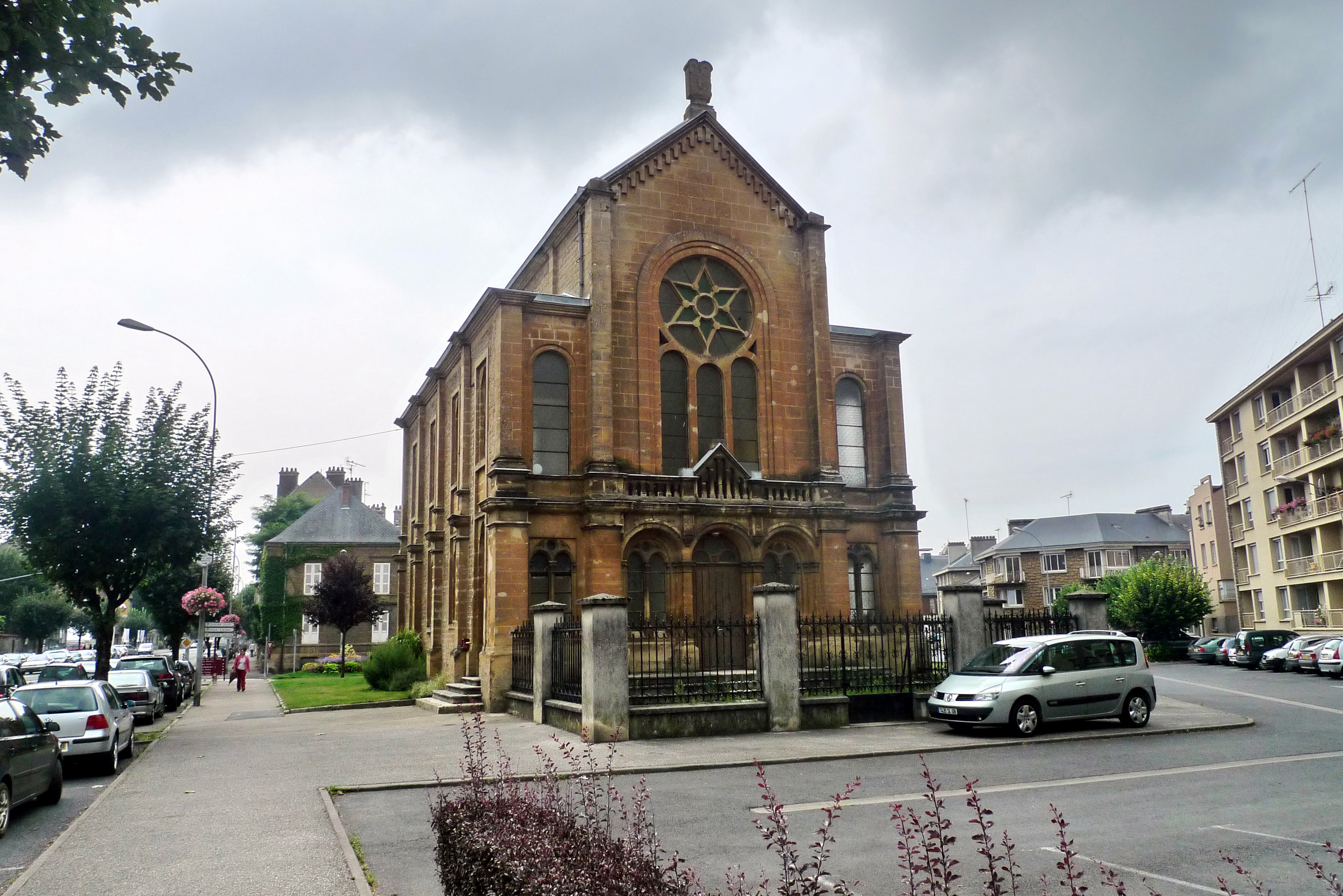
- The synagogue in 2009, prior to its sale

- Location of the former synagogue in France

Religion
- Affiliation: Judaism (former)
- Rite: Nusach Ashkenaz
- Ecclesiastical or organizational status: Synagogue (1878–2023); Exhibition space (since 2023)
- Status: Abandoned; repurposed

Location
- Location: 6, avenue de Verdun, Sedan, Ardennes, Grand Est
- Country: France
- Interactive map of Sedan Synagogue
- Coordinates: 49°41′55″N 4°56′56″E

Architecture
- Architect: Alfred Mazuel
- Type: Synagogue architecture
- Style: Romanesque Revival; Byzantine Revival
- Established: c. 1850s (as a congregation)
- Completed: 1878
- Materials: Stone

Monument historique
- Official name: Synagogue
- Type: Base Mérimée
- Criteria: Patrimoine architectural
- Designated: 13 September 1984
- Reference no.: PA00078524

The Sedan Synagogue (French: Synagogue de Sedan) is a former Jewish congregation and synagogue, located at 6, avenue de Verdun, Sedan, in the Ardennes department of the Grand Est region, in northern France. The synagogue was built by the Jewish community in 1878. Although the Jews were deported during World War II, the synagogue survived. The congregation used to worship in the Ashkenazi rite.

The synagogue was listed as a monument historique on 13 September 1984.

== History ==
In the early 19th century, the Jewish community of Sedan was small and apartments like that of the Salomon-Créhange family on Saint-Michel Street were used as synagogue. By the end of the 19th century the Jewish community has grown and in 1878 a new synagogue was built, designed by architect Alfred Mazuel, in the |Romanesque Revival and Byzantine Revival styles. The site was near Basse des Remparts Street, between the Bastions de Bourbon and the Turenne that had been cleared to make place for Philippoteaux Avenue.

During World War II many Jews from Sedan were sent to the concentration camps. In 1962, at the end of the Algerian War, repatriation to France helped enlarge the Jewish community of Sedan. Later economic factors caused a shift of populations towards the big cities, notably Paris, and the Jewish community of Sedan dwindled. Some Jews also emigrated to Israel. The synagogue was subsequently abandoned.

In 2023 the synagogue building was sold to the local council for use as an exhibition space.

== Gallery ==

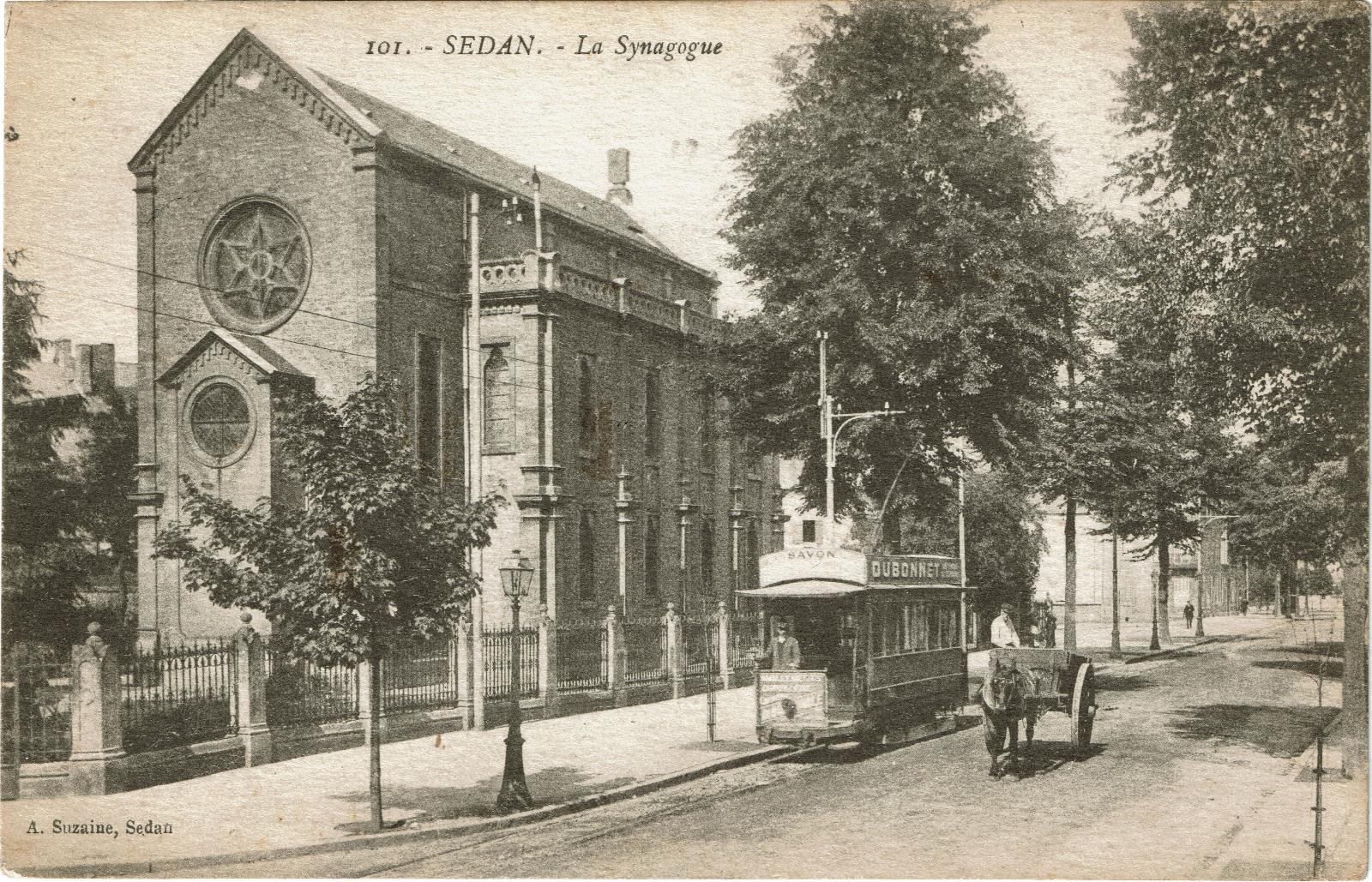

== See also ==
- History of the Jews in France
- List of synagogues in France
