= Amiens Synagogue =

Orthodox synagogue located in Somme, France

- French: Synagogue d'Amiens
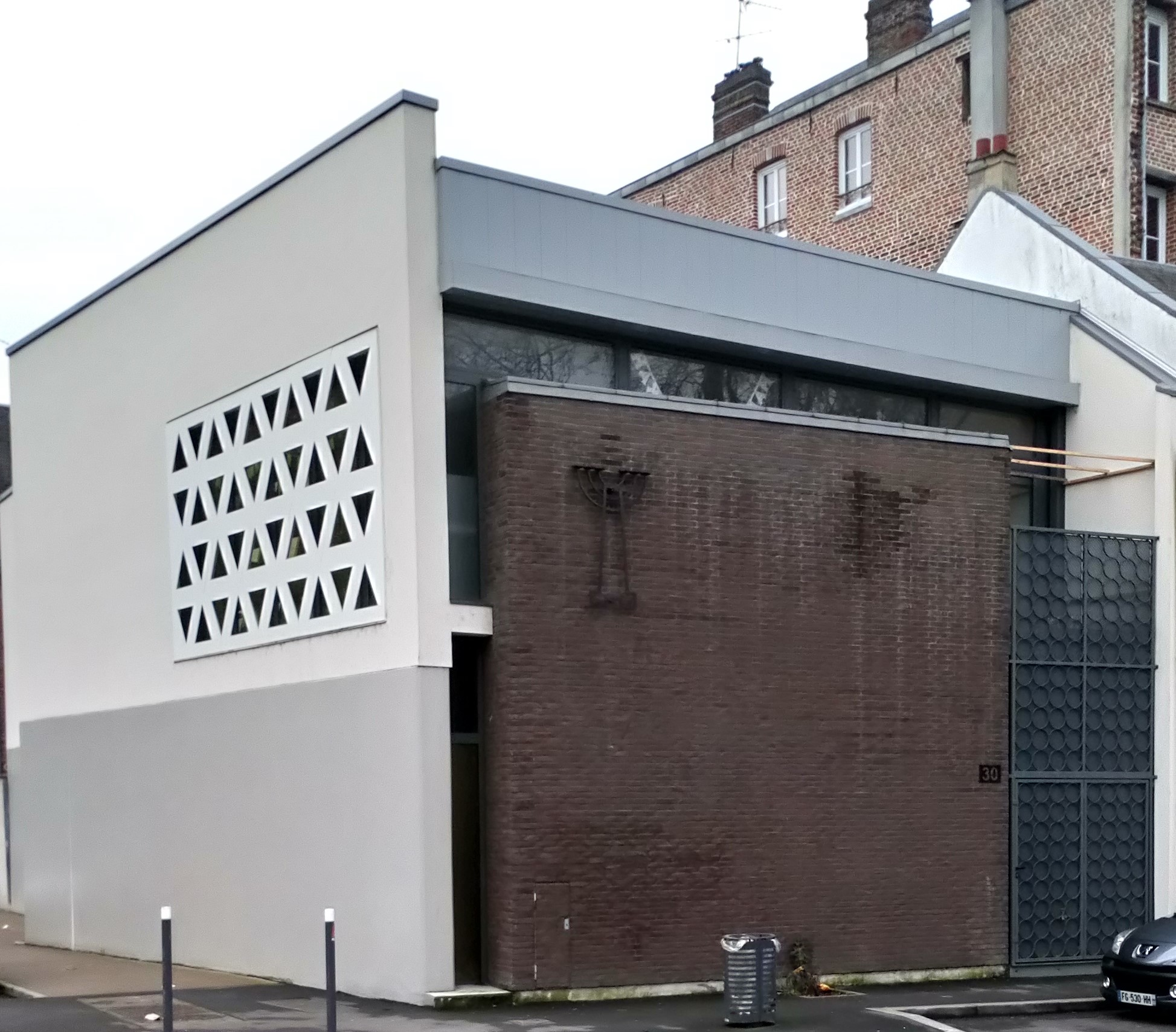

- Location of the synagogue in France

Religion
- Affiliation: Orthodox Judaism
- Ecclesiastical or organizational status: Synagogue
- Status: Active

Location
- Location: Rue du Cloître-de-la-Barge, Amiens, Somme
- Country: France
- Interactive map of Amiens Synagogue
- Coordinates: 49°53′41″N 2°18′29″E

Architecture
- Architect: Paul Chemetov (2017)
- Type: Synagogue architecture
- Style: Modernist architecture (2017)
- Established: 1933 (as a congregation)
- Completed: 1935 (Cloître-de-la-Barge #1); 1969 (Port d'Amont); 2017 (Cloître-de-la-Barge #2)
- Construction cost: €425,000 (2017)
- Interior area: 265 square metres (2,850 sq ft)

The Amiens Synagogue (French: Synagogue d'Amiens) is an Orthodox Jewish congregation and synagogue, located in the city of Amiens in the Department of Somme, France. The synagogue, rededicated in 2017, replaced two previous buildings.

== History ==
In 1933 the Association cultuelle israélite de la Somme was founded in Amiens and began an affiliation with the Israelite Central Consistory of France, one of the key Orthodox bodies in France. The congregation's first president was René Louria, a businessman and confectioner in Amiens.

The first synagogue building was dedicated in 1935 by the Jewish community, located in a building on Rue du Cloître-de-la-Barge, not far from the cathedral and the courthouse. Jean Moulin, then secretary general of the Prefecture of the Somme, attended the dedication of the building.

During the Second World War, the synagogue was expropriated and set to be sold by the Nazis. Collaborationist forces in Amiens occupied the synagogue during the occupation of the city. The synagogue was returned to the Jewish community following the Liberation of France. The community's Torah scroll had been safeguarded during the war by non-Jewish members of the community. After the war, the community rebuilt despite losing synagogue president René Louria at Auschwitz.

=== Remembrance ceremony ===
On December 2, 1951, Le Souvenir français, a French association for maintaining war memorials and war memory, organized a ceremony at the synagogue to remember those in the Jewish community who were killed during the war. Rabbi Paul Bauer of Paris gave a speech at the event, making a point to remember all the dead of the war, regardless of their political, philosophical or religious views. The service was celebrated by Henri Kahn, the chief officiant of the Grande synagogue de Paris.

=== Moving locations ===
In 1968, the synagogue was moved because the block where it was located was undergoing construction, requiring demolition of the building. A new synagogue opened its doors in 1969 at Port d'Amont, close to the Pont Beauvillé, where the community used a re-purposed garage as a worship space.

Due to a 2004 real estate deal, the synagogue's location at Port d'Amont was also moved. A new synagogue building was built a few meters from the original building on Rue du Cloître-de-la-Barge. The building was dedicated on October 22, 2017, with Chief Rabbi of France Haïm Korsia in attendance, as well as Jewish and political figures from Lille, Paris and Amiens.

== Architectural characteristics ==
The new Modernist Amiens Synagogue is the work of Paul Chemetov, who was influenced by the Bauhaus style. It is constructed according to a Parallelepipedic plan. The facade, overlooking the Port d'Amont, is understated, decorated only with a Menorah. The sides of the building have mashrabiya openings that resemble Stars of David. A side door with the Tablets of Stone leads to the ground floor, where the sanctuary is located. On the south wall is a commemorative plaque inscribed with the names of those lost from Amiens during the Shoah. Upper floors in the building include a meeting room and other bedrooms.

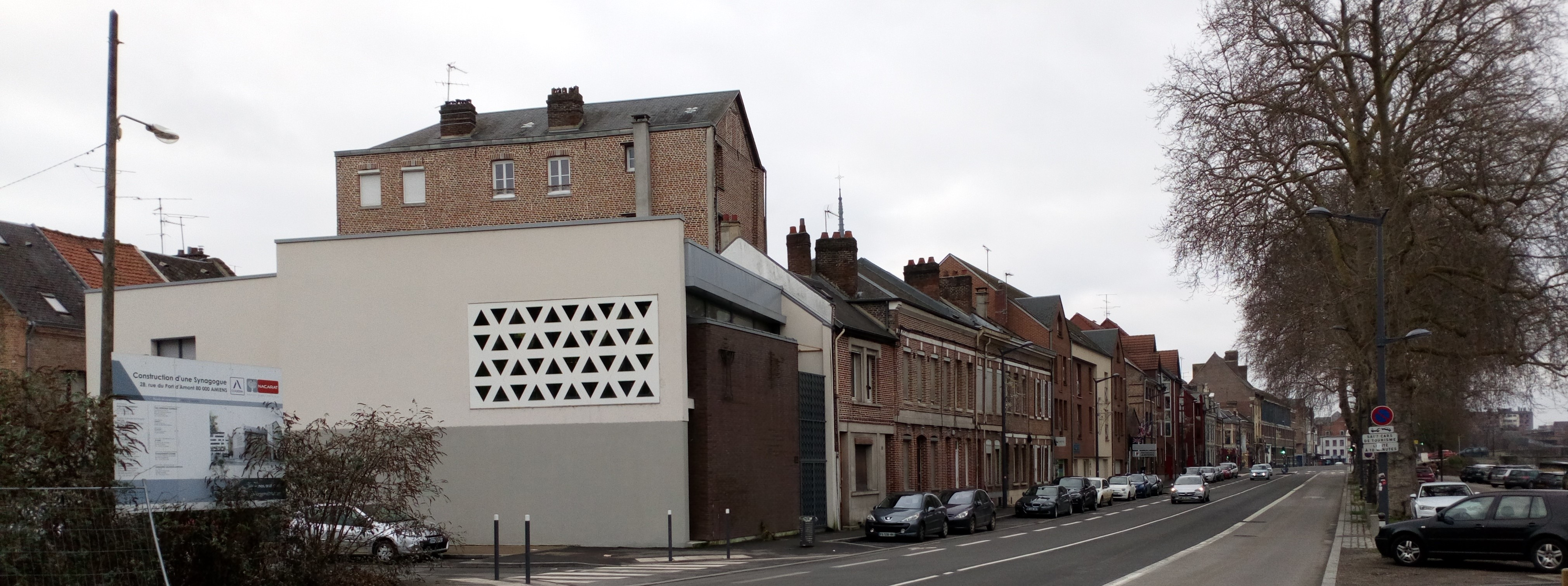

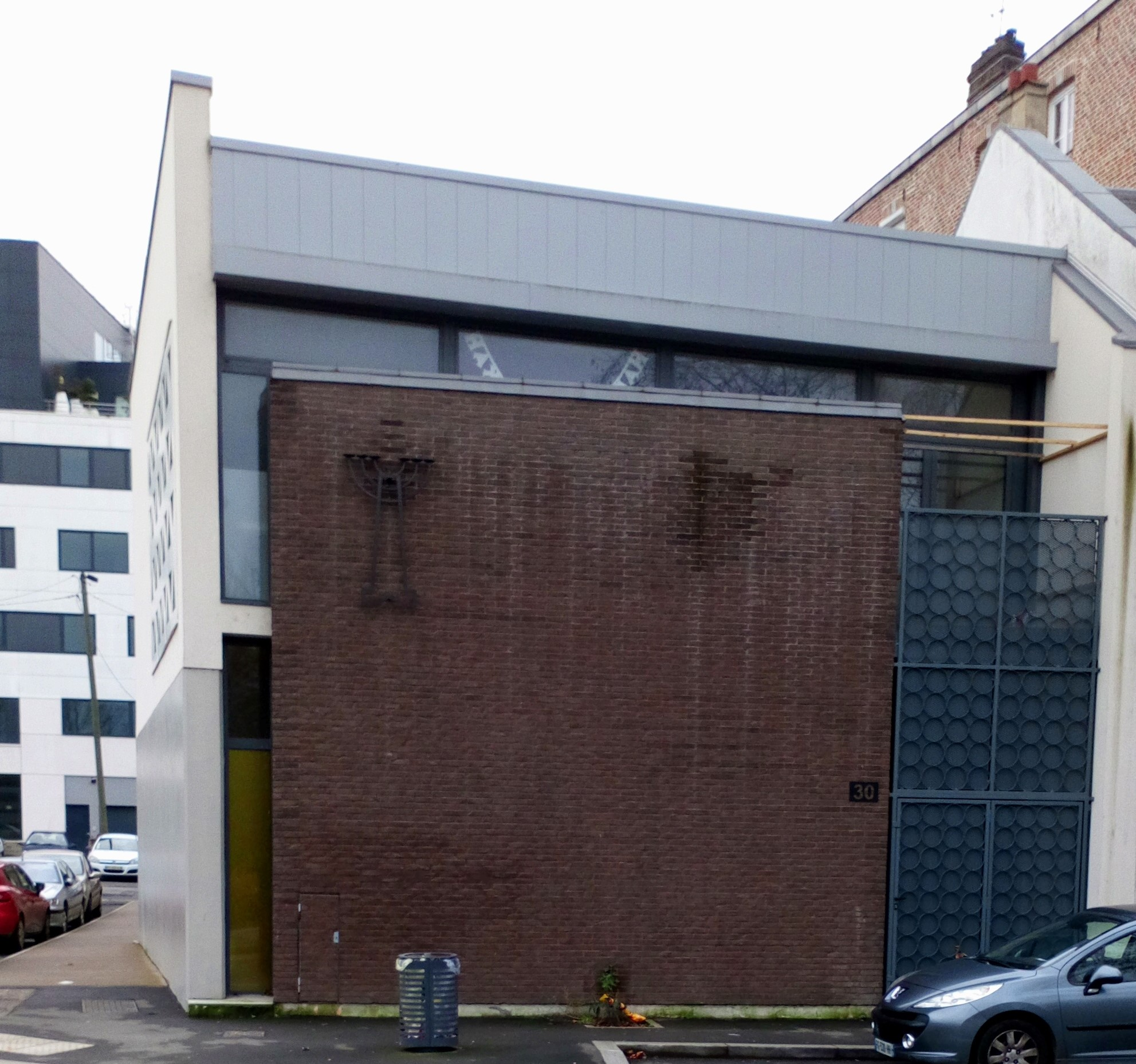

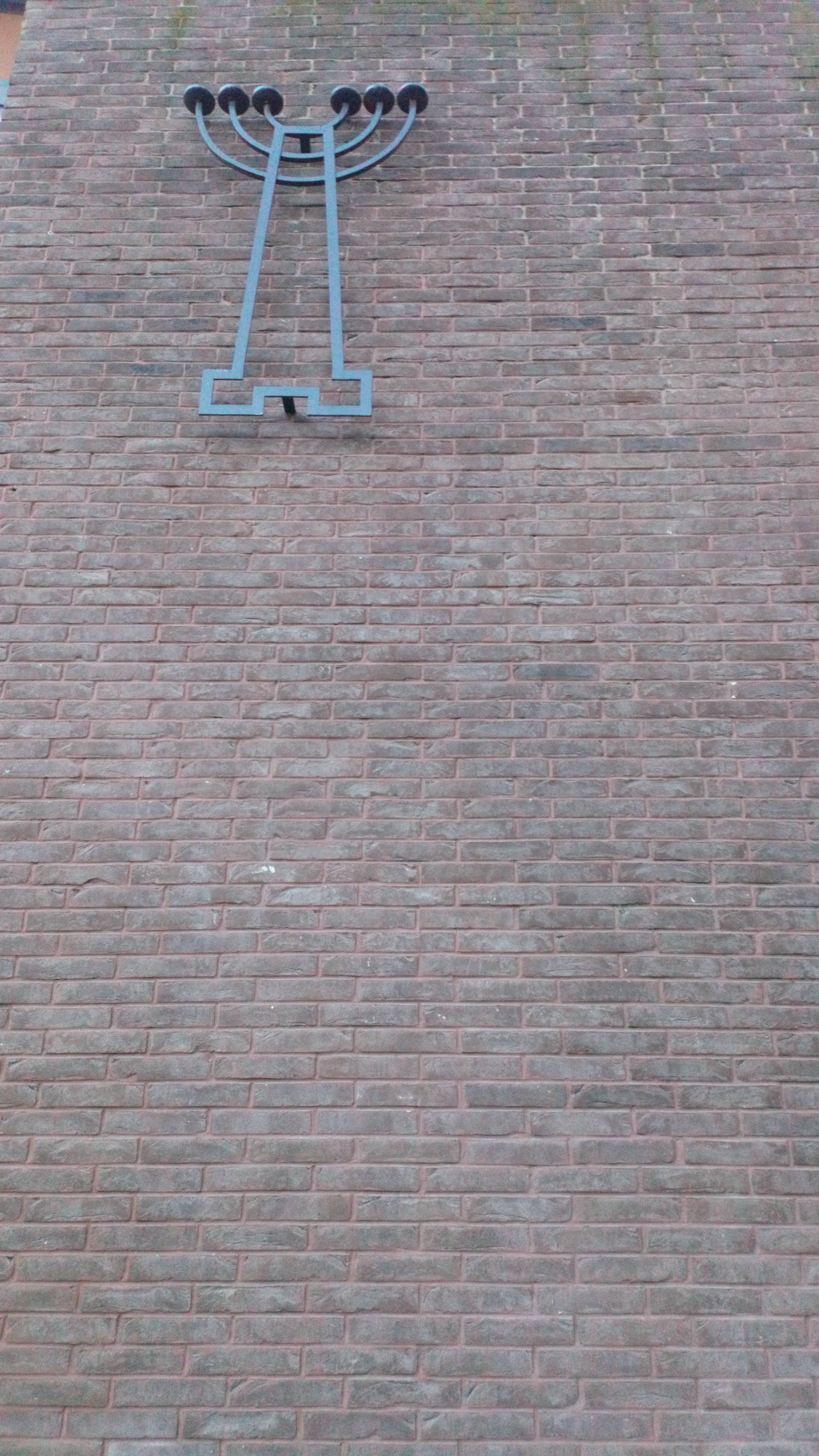

== See also ==
- History of Amiens
- History of the Jews in France
- List of synagogues in France
