= Beth Meir Synagogue =

Orthodox synagogue located on Corsica, France

- French: Synagogue de Bastia Beth Meir; Hebrew: בית כנסת בית מאיר
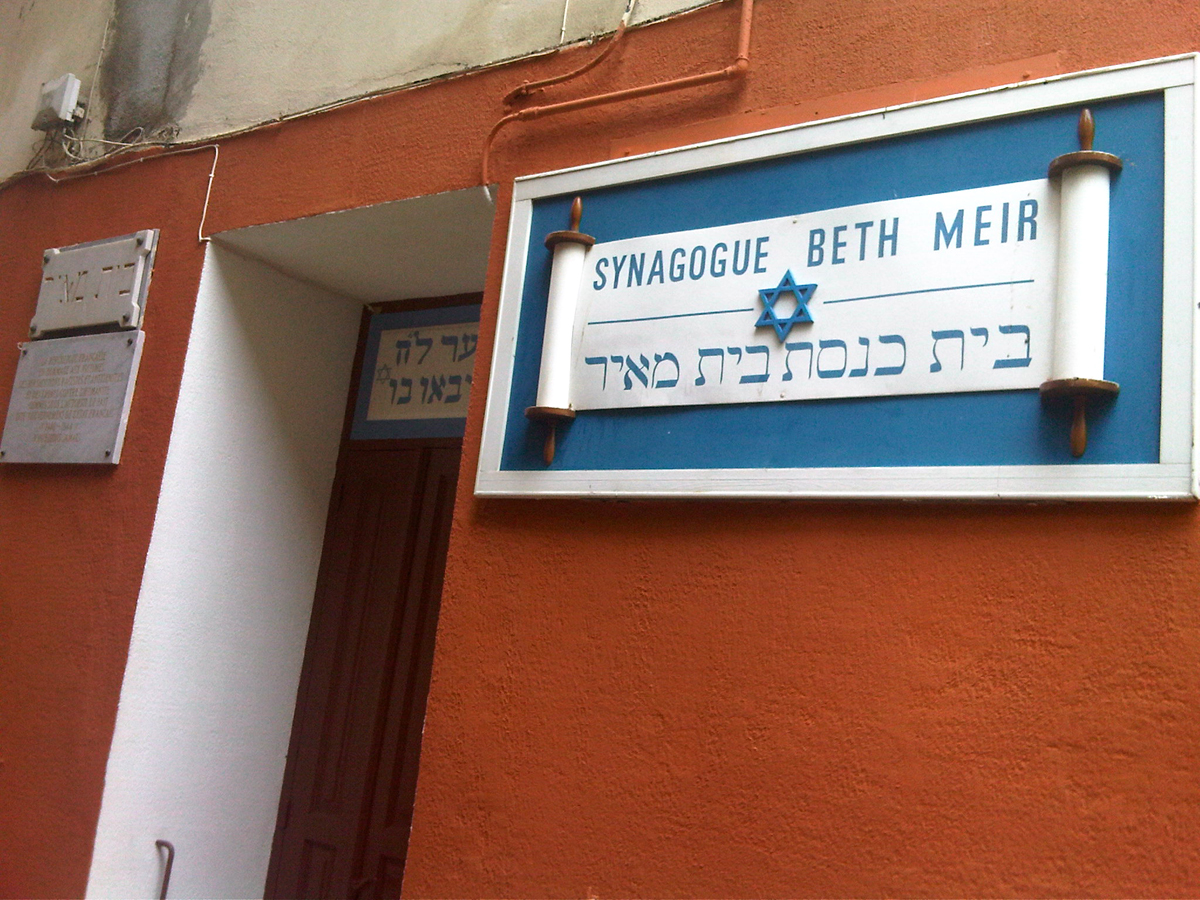

- Locatio of the synagogue in Corsica

Religion
- Affiliation: Orthodox Judaism
- Rite: Nusach Sefard
- Ecclesiastical or organizational status: Synagogue

Location
- Location: 3 Rue du Castagno, Bastia, Corscia, Hauts-de-France
- Country: France
- Interactive map of Beth Meir Synagogue
- Coordinates: 42°41′47″N 9°26′55″E

Architecture
- Type: Synagogue architecture
- Style: Vernacular
- Established: 1934 (as a congregation)
- Completed: 1934
- Materials: Brick

Website
- synagoguecorsebastia.org (in French)

The Beth Meir Synagogue, officially Beth Knesset Beth Meir, (French: Synagogue de Bastia Beth Meir; Hebrew: בית כנסת בית מאיר), is an Orthodox Jewish congregation and synagogue. located at 3 Rue du Castagno in Bastia, on the island of Corsica.

== History ==
During World War I, Jewish families from French Mandated Syria and Lebanon arrived in Corsica, escaping the ravages of the Sinai and Palestine campaign led by the armies of the German and Ottoman Empire. They settled in the large coastal villages, Bastia and Ajaccio.

The congregation in Bastia was founded in 1934 in an apartment in the historic section of the city. The brick synagogue building was completed in the same year. Its name, Beth Knesset Beth Meir, is a reference to Rabbi Meïr, one of the biblical sages quoted in the Mishnah. During the Second World War, when 80,000 Italian soldiers and 15,000 Nazi German soldiers occupied the island, part of the community was imprisoned at a camp in Asco. None of them were deported to Nazi concentration camps in Continental Europe, and were released from the prison camp after the liberation of Corsica by the Moroccan Goumiers and French Resistance guerilla forces. Rabbi Méir Tolédano (1889-1970) was the community's rabbi from 1920 until his death in 1970.

== See also ==
- History of the Jews in France
- List of synagogues in France
