= Nice Synagogue =

Historic Orthodox synagogue located in Nice, France

- French: Synagogue de Nice
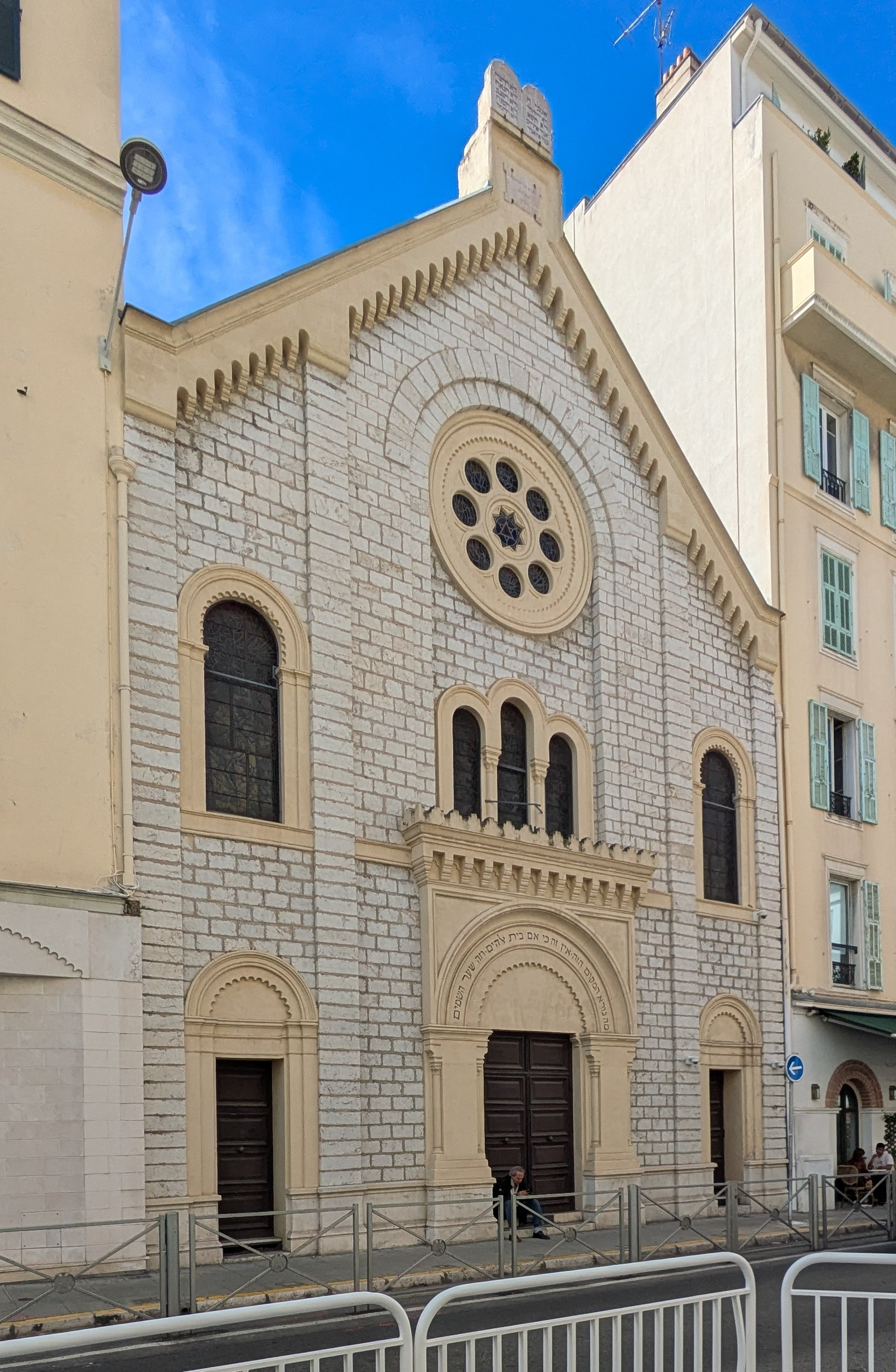
- The synagogue in 2025

- Location of the synagogue in France

Religion
- Affiliation: Orthodox Judaism
- Rite: Nusach Ashkenaz
- Ecclesiastical or organisational status: Synagogue
- Status: Active

Location
- Location: 7, rue Gustave Deloye, Nice, Alpes-Maritimes, Provence-Alpes-Côte d'Azur
- Country: France
- Coordinates: 43°41′59″N 7°16′10″E

Architecture
- Architect: Paul Martin
- Type: Synagogue architecture
- Style: Byzantine Revival
- Established: 1733 (as a congregation)
- Completed: 1886
- Materials: Stone

Website
- consistoirenice.org

Monument historique
- Official name: Synagogue ou temple israélite (in French)
- Type: Base Mérimée
- Designated: April 17, 2004
- Reference no.: PA06000030

The Nice Synagogue (French: Synagogue de Nice), also the Great Synagogue in Nice, (Note: Also the Grand Synagogue of Nice.) is an Orthodox Jewish congregation and synagogue, located at 7, rue Gustave Deloye in Nice, Alpes-Maritimes, in the Provence-Alpes-Côte d'Azur region of France. Designed by Paul Martin, the synagogue was built in 1885, and dedicated in 1886. It was listed as a monument historique on April 17, 2004. The congregation worships in the Ashkenazi rite.

== History ==
Nice became part of Frances in 1860. Prior to that, since 1388, it had been part of the County of Savoy, modern-day Italy, dominated by Roman Catholicism. The first recorded presence of Jews in Nice dates from the 14th century where Jews were required to wear a distinctive symbol. At times during the 15th century, Jews were required to live in certain areas and were limited to certain professions. During the 16th and 17th centuries, a much more liberal approach was adopted, resulting in Jews migrating to Nice from Italy and The Netherlands. From 1723, falling under Sardinian control, King Victor Amédée decreed that all Jews were required to live in the ghetto.

In 1733 permission was given to designate a synagogue on the third floor of a building owned by the Catholic brotherhood Pénitents Noirs, with a mikveh in the basement. Later this building was sold to help finance the construction of the current synagogue.

Later in the 18th century, Charles Emmanuel III, the Duke of Savoy, relaxed those rules, with further relaxation following the French Revolution in 1789. Falling under Sardinian control in the 19th century, Jews living in Nice were again regulated. Under the rule of King Charles Albert, from the mid-19th century, Jews were fully emancipated.

During World War II, Nice was initially in the demilitarized zone between the Vichy-controlled and the Italian occupied areas. Nice attracted many Jews from other areas that were subject to persecution. When the Nazis occupied Nice, from 1943, over five months, 5,000 Jews were arrested and deported. Following the war, the number of Jews swelled to 20,000, mainly from North Africa. In the early part of the 21st century, less than 10,000 Jews lived in Nice.

== See also ==
- History of Nice
- History of the Jews in France
- List of synagogues in France
