= Hochfelden, Bas-Rhin =

Hochfelden
- Commune
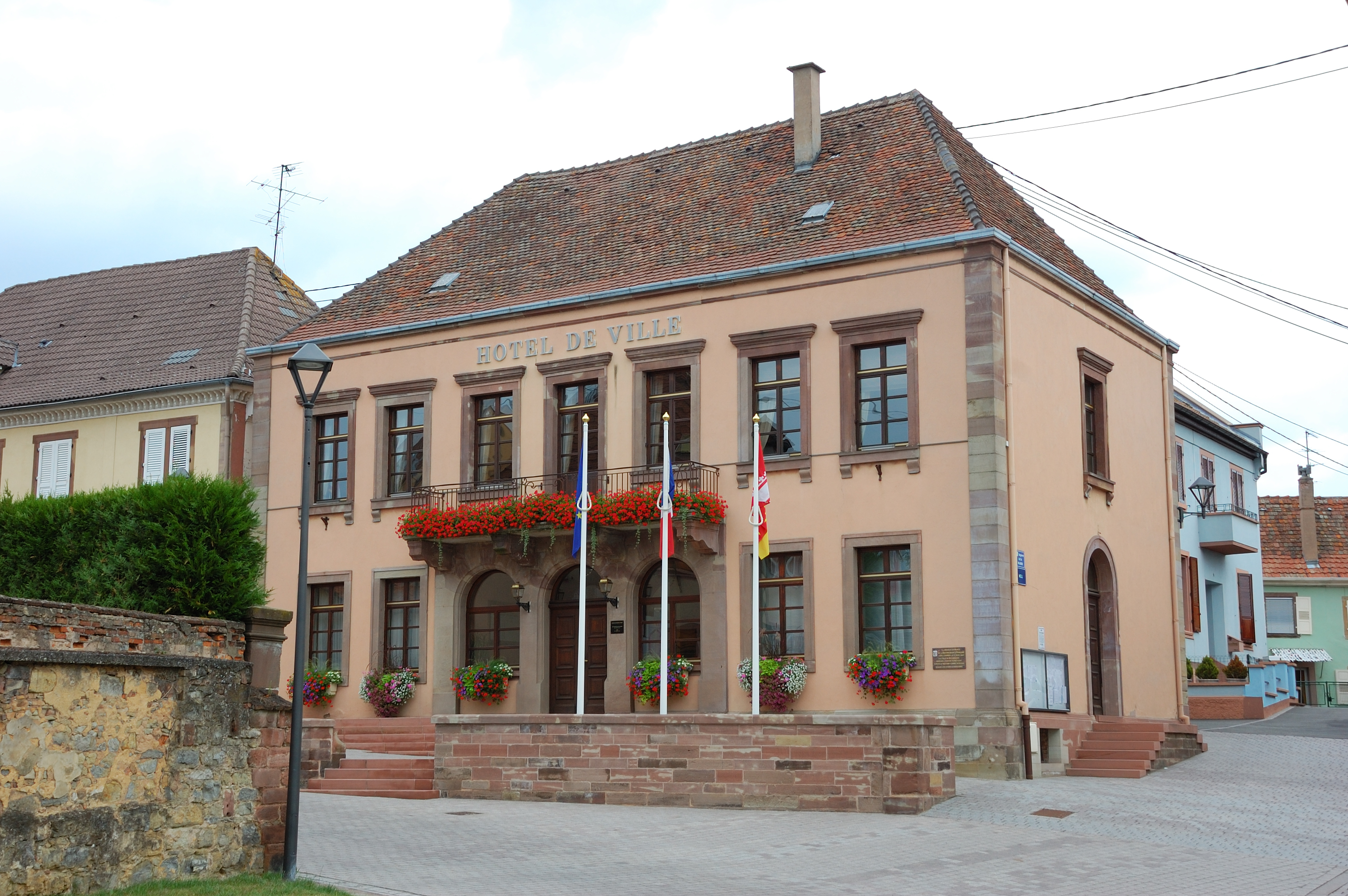
- The town hall in Hochfelden

- Coat of arms
- Location of Hochfelden
- Location within France Location within Grand Est
- Coordinates: 48°45′37″N 7°34′15″E
- Country: France
- Region: Grand Est
- Department: Bas-Rhin
- Arrondissement: Saverne
- Canton: Bouxwiller
- Intercommunality: Pays de la Zorn

Government
  - Mayor (2020–2026): Georges Pfister
- Area^{1}: 15.76 km^{2} (6.08 sq mi)
- Highest elevation: 222 m (728 ft)
- Lowest elevation: 155 m (509 ft)
- Population (2023): 4,038
  - Density: 256.2/km^{2} (663.6/sq mi)
- Time zone: UTC+01:00 (CET)
  - Summer (DST): UTC+02:00 (CEST)
- INSEE/Postal code: 67202 /67270
- ^{1} French Land Register data, which excludes lakes, ponds, glaciers > 1 km^{2} (0.386 sq mi or 247 acres) and river estuaries.

Hochfelden is a commune in the Bas-Rhin department in Grand Est in north-eastern France. On 1 January 2017, the former commune of Schaffhouse-sur-Zorn was merged into Hochfelden.

== History ==
Until their deportation to the south in 1940, Hochfelden had a significant Jewish community. The town possesses a synagogue, which is also registered as a Monument historique.

In 1941, more than 200 young people celebrated Bastille Day with a street procession. The occupying forces retaliated, placing the village under a state of siege. The Mayor and Gendarmes were replaced and 106 people, including 23 women, were interned at Schirmeck. The information was reported to London where the events were reported by the BBC.

== Population ==
Population data refer to the area corresponding with the commune as of January 2025.

Historical population
| Year | Pop. | ±% p.a. |
|---|---|---|
| 1968 | 3,165 | — |
| 1975 | 3,191 | +0.12% |
| 1982 | 3,184 | −0.03% |
| 1990 | 3,088 | −0.38% |
| 1999 | 3,293 | +0.72% |
| 2007 | 3,449 | +0.58% |
| 2012 | 3,903 | +2.50% |
| 2017 | 3,987 | +0.43% |
| 2023 | 4,038 | +0.21% |
Source: INSEE

== Economy ==
Meteor beer is brewed and sold in Hochfelden.

== See also ==
- Communes of the Bas-Rhin department
