= Saint-Avold =

Saint-Avold Sänt Avuur (Lorraine Franconian)
- Commune
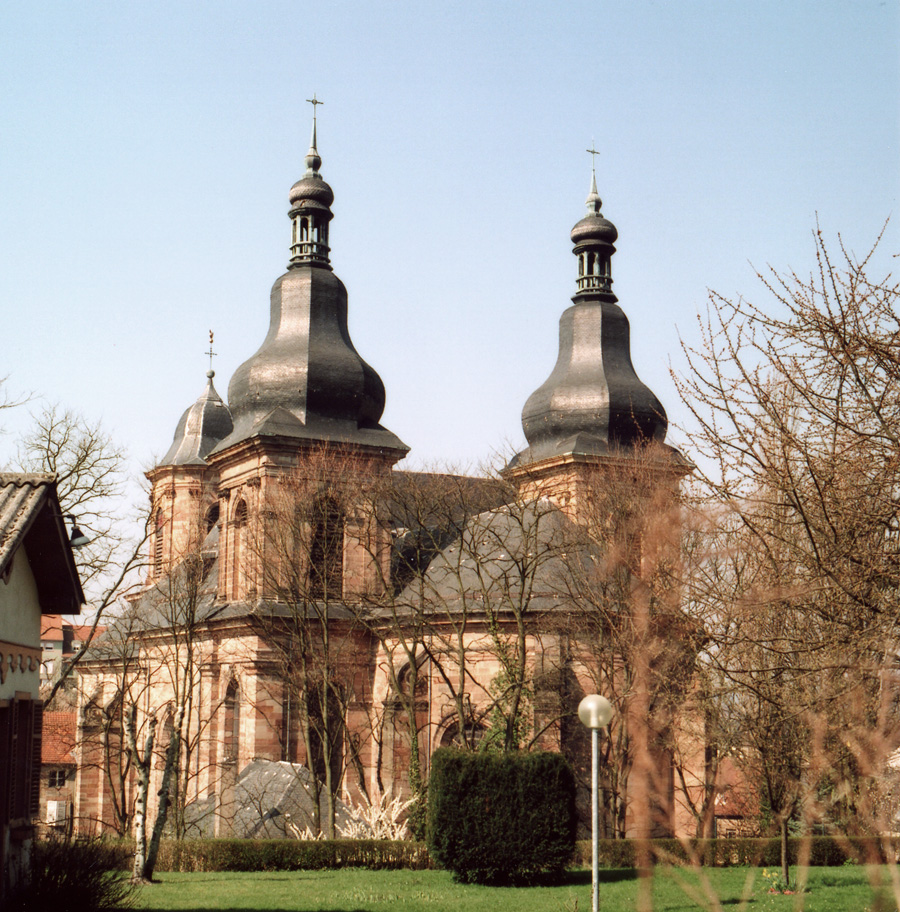
- Eastern end of Abbey of Saint-Nabor

- Coat of arms
- Location of Saint-Avold
- Location within France Location within Grand Est
- Coordinates: 49°06′16″N 6°42′24″E
- Country: France
- Region: Grand Est
- Department: Moselle
- Arrondissement: Forbach-Boulay-Moselle
- Canton: Saint-Avold
- Intercommunality: CA Saint-Avold Synergie

Government
  - Mayor (2020–2026): René Steiner
- Area^{1}: 35.48 km^{2} (13.70 sq mi)
- Highest elevation: 383 m (1,257 ft)
- Lowest elevation: 215 m (705 ft)
- Population (2023): 14,755
  - Density: 415.9/km^{2} (1,077/sq mi)
- Time zone: UTC+01:00 (CET)
  - Summer (DST): UTC+02:00 (CEST)
- INSEE/Postal code: 57606 /57500
- ^{1} French Land Register data, which excludes lakes, ponds, glaciers > 1 km^{2} (0.386 sq mi or 247 acres) and river estuaries.

Saint-Avold (French pronunciation: [sɛ̃.t‿avɔld]; German: Sankt Avold; Lorraine Franconian: Sänt Avuur) is a commune in the Moselle department in Grand Est in north-eastern France.

It is situated twenty-eight miles (45 km) east of Metz, France and seventeen miles (27 km) southwest of Saarbrücken, Germany.

== History ==
The Saint-Avold area has frequently suffered invasions and since the nineteenth century has been controlled alternately by German and French authorities.

The original Abbey of Saint Nabor began as an oratory for a sixth-century monastery. Gradually a complex developed after it received the relics of Saint Nabor, and the church was rebuilt in the eighteenth century, in part following Baroque style. It was designated as a basilica.

During the French Revolution, the monastery and church suffered extensive damage; the cloisters were destroyed. The ancient parish church was sacrificed in exchange for keeping Saint Nabor. The abbey also suffered bombing damage during World War II, but much of the church has been restored.

The Saint-Avold Synagogue is a Jewish synagogue near Place Paul-Collin. The current synagogue building, completed in 1956, replaces a nearby synagogue which was also destroyed during World War II.

== Population ==
Historical population
| Year | Pop. | ±% p.a. |
|---|---|---|
| 1968 | 16,280 | — |
| 1975 | 17,955 | +1.41% |
| 1982 | 16,485 | −1.21% |
| 1990 | 16,533 | +0.04% |
| 1999 | 16,922 | +0.26% |
| 2007 | 16,611 | −0.23% |
| 2012 | 16,349 | −0.32% |
| 2017 | 15,483 | −1.08% |
| 2023 | 14,755 | −0.80% |
Source: INSEE

== Lorraine American Cemetery ==
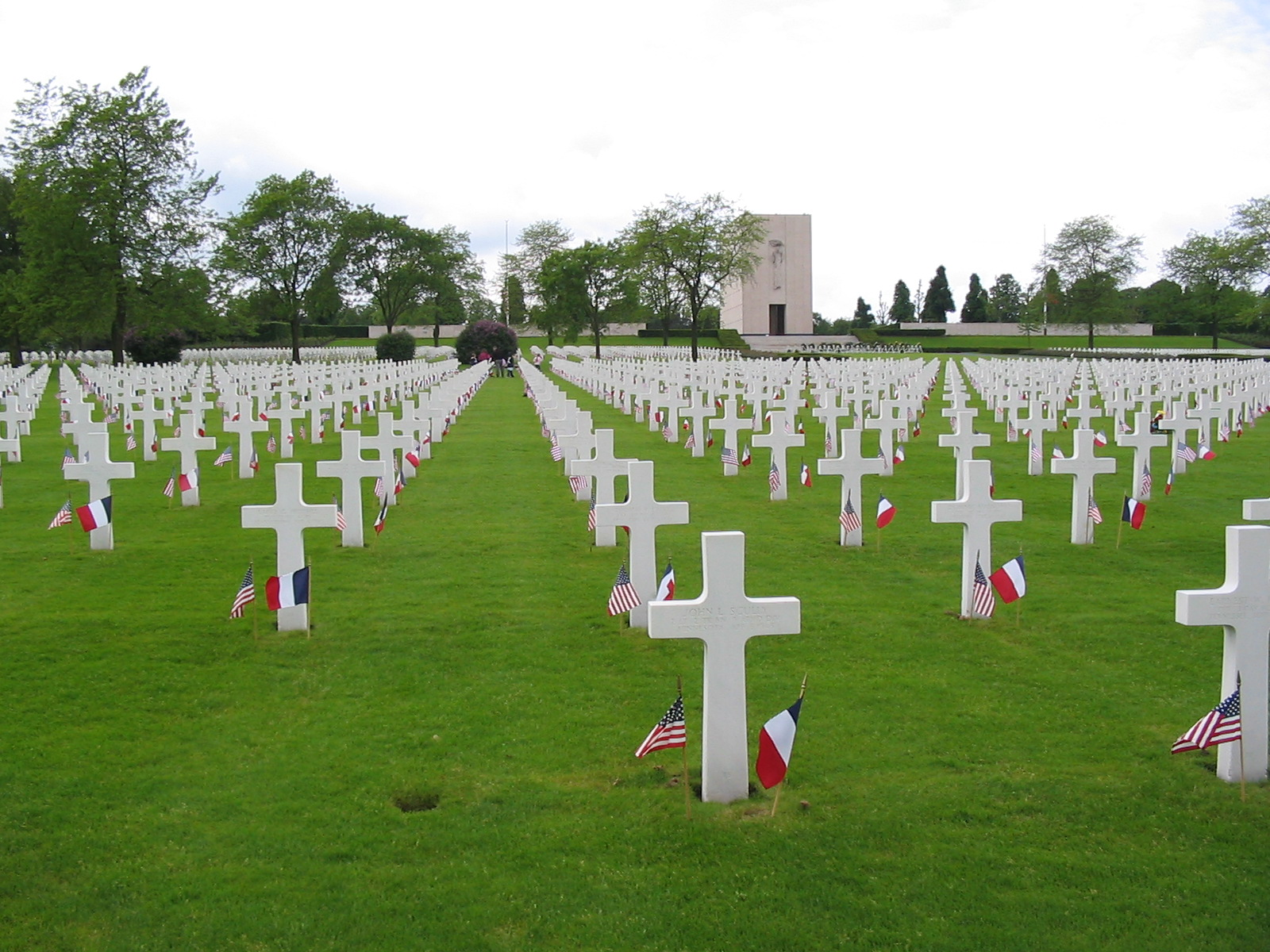
Lorraine American Cemetery in Saint-Avold

Just north of the town is the site of Europe's largest United States' World War II military cemetery, the Lorraine American Cemetery and Memorial, with the graves of 10,489 American soldiers who died during World War II. Most of the men were killed during the United States' drive to expel German forces from the fortress city of Metz toward the Siegfried Line and the Rhine River. The soldiers were mostly from the U.S. Seventh Army's Infantry and Armored divisions and its cavalry groups.

== Climate ==
Climate in this area has mild differences between highs and lows, and there is adequate rainfall year-round. The Köppen Climate Classification subtype for this climate is "Cfb" (Marine West Coast Climate/Oceanic climate).

Climate data for Saint-Avold
| Month | Jan | Feb | Mar | Apr | May | Jun | Jul | Aug | Sep | Oct | Nov | Dec | Year |
|---|---|---|---|---|---|---|---|---|---|---|---|---|---|
| Mean daily maximum °C (°F) | 4 (39) | 6 (42) | 11 (52) | 15 (59) | 19 (67) | 22 (72) | 24 (76) | 24 (75) | 21 (69) | 15 (59) | 9 (48) | 4 (40) | 14 (58) |
| Mean daily minimum °C (°F) | −2 (29) | −2 (29) | 1 (34) | 4 (40) | 8 (46) | 11 (52) | 13 (55) | 13 (55) | 10 (50) | 6 (42) | 2 (36) | −1 (31) | 6 (42) |
| Average precipitation cm (inches) | 5.1 (2) | 4.1 (1.6) | 4.8 (1.9) | 4.6 (1.8) | 5.1 (2) | 5.8 (2.3) | 6.9 (2.7) | 6.4 (2.5) | 5.6 (2.2) | 6.6 (2.6) | 6.1 (2.4) | 6.4 (2.5) | 67 (26.4) |
Source: Weatherbase

== Sister cities ==
- (United States) Fayetteville, North Carolina, USA
- Dudweiler, a borough of Saarbrücken, Germany
- Włocławek, Poland

== Notable people ==
- Louis Aloyse Risse (1850–1925), engineer born in Saint-Avold who designed the Grand Concourse in the Bronx in New York.
- Erich Isselhorst, (1906–1948), Nazi war criminal, executed in Strasbourg in 1948
- Adrienne Thomas (1897–1980), novelist.
- Umut Bozok, (1996–), footballer

== See also ==
- Communes of the Moselle department

== Sister city ==
Saint-Avold has one sister city, as designated by Sister Cities International:

- Fayetteville, North Carolina, United States
