= Joël Mergui =

French dermatologist and Jewish personality

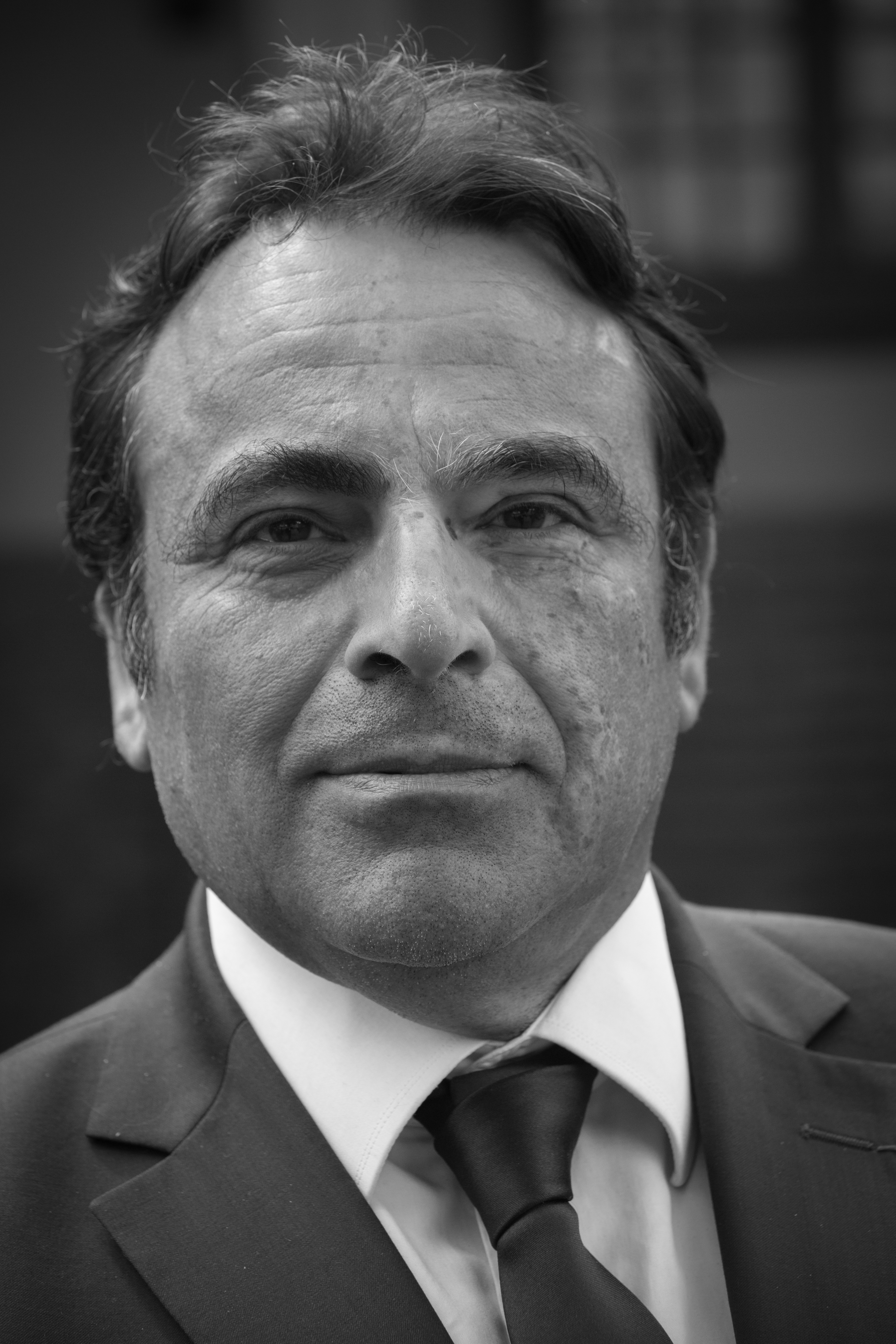
- Born: 25 February 1958 (age 68); Meknes, Morocco

Joël Mergui (born 25 February 1958) is a physician and Jewish official. He serves as the president of the Israelite Central Consistory of France. He is a Knight of the Legion of Honour.
