= Liberal Jewish Community of Île-de-France =

French Jewish community

- French: Communauté juive libérale d'Île-de-France
- Location of the Maison du judaïsme in Paris

Religion
- Affiliation: Reform Judaism
- Ecclesiastical or organisational status: Synagogue
- Status: Active

Location
- Location: 11 rue Moufle, XIe Arrondissement, Paris
- Country: France
- Coordinates: 48°51′35″N 2°22′23″E

Architecture
- Founder: Pauline Bebe
- Established: 1995 (as a congregation)
- Completed: 2006

Website
- cjl-paris.org

Liberal Jewish Community of Île-de-France (Communauté Juive Libérale d'Île-de-France) is a Reform Jewish congregation with a synagogue, located in a Maison du judaïsme at 11 rue Moufle, in the XIe Arrondissement of Paris, France. The community is led by Rabbi Pauline Bebe, the first (and, until 2007, the only) woman rabbi in France. The community is affiliated with Judaism in Motion.

== Reform Judaism in France ==
Although Reform Judaism is dominant within worldwide Judaism, it is still underdeveloped in France. In France, Liberal Judaism is practiced by more than 15,000 people who are distributed in 16 communities belonging to several currents, including l’Union libérale israélite de France (ULIF), le Mouvement juif libéral de France (MJLF), and la Communauté juive libérale d’Île-de-France (CJL). The CJL and a few other Reform communities are not accepted within the Orthodox Consistoire. The Consistoire was founded in 1808 after the French Revolution, when the Jews of France were granted civil rights under the direction of Napoleon, whose goal was to make mainstream Frenchmen out of the Jewish people.

== Communal facilities ==
From 1995 to 2006, the CJL's home was in the XVIIIe arrondissement, at 6, rue Pierre Ginier. The congregation originally resembled a chavurah, and was located in a small apartment. Since May 2006 the CJL have a new home, La Maison du judaïsme, in the XIe arrondissement. The Maison du judaïsme consists of a multi-purpose complex center with a synagogue, a theater, an art exhibit and a library, as well as classrooms and offices. It also has a cultural organization called NITSA. As of 2013, the CJL congregation consisted of more than 400 households, and about 100 children regularly go to the Talmud Torah.

== See also ==
- History of the Jews in France
- Liberal Jewish Movement of France
- Pauline Bebe
