= Lovy =

Lovy is a surname. Notable people with the surname include:

- Alex Lovy, American animator (1913–1992)
- Bonny Lovy, Bolivian singer-songwriter (1991–)
- Israel Lovy, Jewish cantor and composer (1773–1832)
