= The Reform Jewish cantorate during the 19th century =

The modern Reform Cantorate is seen as a result of developments that took place during the 19th century, largely in Europe. The process continued to evolve in America following the emigration of German Reform Jews towards the end of the century.

== Emancipation ==
We may attribute these events to a new dialectic obtaining between Jews who saw themselves as reformers and the views held at the time by the majority of Jews in the world. Although a modernist tendency was already present within European Jewish thought, the French Revolution and its aftermath gave free rein to those who wished to remake Judaism based on the new relationship Judaism had with Western society.

== Revision of the service ==
The novel experience of life "as citizens" was for Jews, as if a mirror had been cast in front of them. They appraised themselves in relation to non-Jews as they never had before and felt the need to accommodate the new situation in religious as well as in civic life.

...ancient Jewish ritual practices stood in pale contrast to the enlightened modern church. The church offered participatory rites punctuated by the singing of moving hymns by the congregation and impressive performances by professional choirs singing the glorious music of Bach and Mozart—complete with stirring instrumental accompaniments. The synagogue offered unaccompanied Eastern chants known only to a limited inner circle of chazzanim, recited in an antique, literally backward and virtually incomprehensible language. How could Judaism hope to compete on such a stage? The only possible answer was to reformulate Judaism to suit the sensibilities of the modern era.

The model for change tended to be the relatively staid Protestant service. The Orthodox service, previously marked by its fervor, slowly changed into a "modern" synagogue ritual in an attempt to achieve the decorum that was thought to go with recognition by the state. Many aspects of the way in which prayer was rendered (and therefore the music) changed rapidly. "Unsuitable traditional singing which interrupts the prayer" was curtailed, and congregants were "reminded and ordered to follow the cantor's prayers quietly and silently"

Rather than rabbis, the first figures to make and attempt reform were laymen. The first successful reformer of synagogue ritual was Israel Jacobson (1768–1822), a wealthy and influential merchant. His goal was to reform ritual as well as religious education of the Jews in Germany. In Seesen (in Lower Saxony) in 1810, he erected the first Reform temple on the grounds of a boys' school. Many innovations were based on the Christian model. The temple had a bell used to announce the time of prayer. For the first time sermons were delivered in German. Jacobson was the first to introduce confirmation.

== Overturning the traditional musical style ==
As well as taking responsibility for re-arranging the ritual, the music was also changed. Jacobson installed an organ. A children's service was set, into which he introduced hymns that used tunes from Protestant chorales. The chanting of the Pentateuch and Prophets and prayers according to traditional modes were discarded. The service was read without chant, meaning that there was no longer the need for a chazzan; at least not a chazzan who could only function in the traditional capacity.

Not only were congregants quieted, but also the high and low voiced singers who used to accompany the chazzan were replaced by decorous choruses as change spread across the German lands community by community throughout the first half of the nineteenth century. Hymns in German replaced the old piyutim, [liturgical poems] which began to be curtailed or proscribed altogether.

The pioneer of Jewish musicology A. Z. Idelsohn (1882–1938) observes that as long as Jews lived in the belief that their stay in the Diaspora was compulsory galut (exile), as long as it was necessary to hope for a return to Palestine, they instinctively preserved the Semitic-Oriental element in themselves and in their cultural creations. Again, this self-assessment was altered by their self-appraisal as 'citizens' of a nation. The Reform usage of the term 'temple' for their places of worship (rather than 'synagogue') was intended to convey a renunciation of any desire to rebuild the Temple of Jerusalem; one of the crucial events anticipated by those who envisioned the inevitable return of the Jews to the Levant. Since it was no longer necessary to engender this hope via stylistic elements in their music, Western European melodic and harmonic techniques could be embraced without constraint. Idelsohn explains:

[Rather than abandon Judaism altogether it was thought to] reform their Judaism, by which they meant to cut away exotic, Semitic-Oriental parts, and retain only that part of Judaism which was of a general religious and ethical nature. The idea was so to remodel Judaism that it should not be a stumbling block by reason of its Orientalism and medievalism, that it should be as easy to observe as is Christianity, that, furthermore, the modern Jew should not be offended by its strangeness and should be attracted by its European exterior.

But there was a limit to the amount of change the even a liberal congregation would accept. In Berlin, Jacob Herz Beer (1769–1825) a banker and sugar manufacturer, the father of the composer Giacomo Meyerbeer (1791–1864) opened a temple in his home according to Jacobson's program. His son (who happened to oppose the use of the organ in Jewish services—see below) arranged the music. But from the beginning, Beer was constrained to engage a chazzan in order to attract a greater audience. Back in Seer, Jacobson also acquiesced to public demand and engaged Chazzan Hirsch Goldberg (1807–1893). Together with Julius Freudenthal (1805–1874) (his famous tune to Ein Keloheinu is still sung today) they modernized synagogue song eventually publishing a collection of solos and two-part choir arrangements.

== From Chazzan to Cantor ==
At this point, the new Reform model retained the chazzan's title, but he was beginning to be valued less for his abilities as a soloist and more for his skill in either composing new works or arranging old melodies for the congregation to sing. The new arrangements may have required solo from the chazzan, but it was no longer requisite to sing long solos (or even have a particularly good voice!) in order to be effective. Things were becoming more 'democratic' with regard to who did the singing, but rather than threatening the role of the cantor, this trend enhanced it, because the new responsibilities of composer, arranger, and conductor required conservatory training.

Salomon Sulzer, Samuel Naumbourg and Louis Lewandowski were among the first prominent cantor-composers, serving in Vienna, Paris and Berlin, respectively. Their compositions produced melodies that became established in synagogue worship and remain widely performed today. Their arrangements continue to be studied by cantorial students and performed by synagogue choirs.

=== Salomon Sulzer's advocacy of the organ ===
Salomon Sulzer (1808–1890) was the legendary oberkantor ('chief cantor') of Vienna. He was the first to consciously devise this role (and the title), basing it on the example of J.S. Bach. He is revered as an innovative composer, a singer of marvelous range and expression (a tenor/baritone) and as a prominent teacher, having been a member of the Vienna Conservatory faculty. His compositions combined 'old' and 'new' by setting traditional melodies in arrangement for four-part chorus, influencing the musical style of many synagogues in Eastern and Central Europe. Sulzer's main contributions to synagogue music did not take place as a part of Radical Reform Judaism in Germany, but rather in the context of the Viennese Rite, which was more akin ideologically to the Neologue Synagogues of Hungary and the teachings of Zecharias Frankel. Sulzer took a progressive position on the renewal of vocal music in the synagogue, however he opposed the use of the German language in the Jewish service, and initially the use of organ, and his view won out. Though often erroneously referred to as Reform, the Vienna Stadttemple was, in fact, more akin to a contemporary modern Orthodox synagogue. Max Wohlberg wrote, “The Jews of Vienna eschewed the rationalistic and universalistic ideas of extreme Reform and preferred the milder nationalistic and historic views that were later crystallized by Leopold Zunz, Abraham Geiger, Zechariah Frankel, and even Samson Raphael Hirsch.” The service was officiated strictly by men, and women sat separately. Although some piyyutim were removed, and a few prayers added in the vernacular, the liturgy was, for the most part, the traditional liturgy, (as opposed to the liturgy of radical Reform) as evidenced by Sulzer's primary notated musical compendia, Shir Zion (published between 1840 and 1866). The choir of Sulzer's time consisted strictly of men and boys. Though there were optional organ accompaniments in many of the pieces, the organ was not used during services on the Sabbath and Holidays. Vienna was then the music capital of the world and even chazzanim from Orthodox Eastern Europe came to Vienna in order to learn something of the new style.

Singing and choirs were introduced without much controversy, but when it came to the organ, synagogues were more hesitant, even negative. Meyerbeer, (noted above) when he was asked to compose a work for the consecration of the new Jewish house of worship in Vienna, once made the following comment on music in the synagogue:

You are not about to introduce an organ into the synagogue! That is a purely Christian instrument. What next! ...The human being in prayer should speak to his god without any intermediary. This is what the Jews have done since the destruction of the Temple; it has been the custom for two millennia. We should make no innovations. But if they are determined to have different music, it should in my opinion, be music from trombones and flutes, like those that resounded in the Temple of Solomon.

The first Jewish synod at Leipzig, in June 1869, brought together rabbis and community leaders from all over Europe, the United States, and even the West Indies to discuss the ideas of "enlightened" and liberal Judaism. Salomon Sulzer was a deputy in the synod; the sole representative of cantors and synagogue musicians—testifying to the high regard the body of liberal rabbis held for this cantor and their understanding that music was a critical element in the 'liberal' congregations they envisioned. In his address, Sulzer brought up the issue of the organ.

An instrumental accompaniment of the singing during the worship service [should] be introduced everywhere, in order to make it easier for the members of the congregation to take an active part in the same. ...the organ is worthy of recommendation for the required accompaniment, and there are no religious objections to its us on the Sabbath and on holidays.

The Synod agreed; no objections were raised to its use on the Shabbat and on holidays, in turn recommending that introduction of the organ proceed. Sulzer emphasizes the solo role of the organ; its necessity over and above that of other instruments:

Only the organ is capable of leading the congregations in song, regulating it, masking dissonances; and it should properly be reintroduced into the space that was denied it for all too long in public worship, to the detriment of religious edification The organ makes the priestly office of the chazzan independent of the latter's artistry, and yet saves him from the type of egotistical pseudo-artistry that falls upon the seed of the aesthetically beautiful like mildew and poisons it; it preserves him from the use of those trivial decorative vocal flourishes that provincial cantors use and abuse to appeal to the masses, or the sentimental Polish virtuosity that drives the younger generation, which is generally musically educated, to flee the house of the Lord.

=== Samuel Naumbourg and composers outside of the synagogue ===
Samuel Naumbourg (1817–1880) was descended from ten generations of chazzanim. He grew up in the world of Southern Ashkenazic chazzanut, and was with musicality and intelligence. His was trained in Munich, but his city would be Paris; the major European capital perhaps best distinguished by the significant role influence plays behind the scenes when it comes to music-making.

Naumbourg arrived in Paris in 1843 and began a friendship with Jacques Fromental Halévy, to whom he had been recommended. Naumbourg pursued the position of director of music at the synagogue in rue Notre-Dame-de-Nazareth, a community that had not had chazzan since the death of Israel Lovey in 1832 and the service was in disarray. Anything he proposed however, would have to pass through government's Department of Cults and Education. He submitted an application for the post, which was well-received due in part to favorable endorsement of Halévy:

I was able to form an opinion of his musical studies, and read his compositions. I am of the opinion that he is most suitable to be called to the important position now vacant and that he is capable of elevating it to the height of its true aim. He is keen, motivated by a desire to do well, and should give the organization good musical service, talent, and commitment.

On his appointment Naumbourg immediately began compiling an anthology of traditional liturgical songs.

His great innovation was to include, for the first time songs for soloists and choir commissioned from professional composers. Among the hundreds for traditional ones published in the first two volumes of his Zemirot Yisrael in 1847 and the third volume published in 1865 under the subtitle Shirei Kodesh there were two or three by Charles-Valentin Alkan né Morhange (1813–1888), one by Meyerbeer, and several by Halévy. His 1874 anthology Aggudat Shirim posthumously included three more Halévy settings.

=== How Louis Lewandowski got hired ===
The story of the rise of Louis Lewandowski (1821–1894) illustrates the struggle between the 'old guard' and the 'new guard'.

Eventually, the innovations of Jacob Beer in Berlin were curtailed by the government's forced closure of his synagogue. This led to a conservative reaction on the part of the Jewish Community in Berlin, and the appointment of one Asher Lion (1776–1863) as the chazzan of the Reform temple. Lion re-introduced the old 18th-century chazzanut. This 'restoration' would seem to have effectively discredited Beer's 'adventurism'. Although the hackneyed style Lion proffered continued to predominate until about the middle of the century, his appointment to Berlin Synagogue would ultimately ensure the emergence of the modern cantorate.

At the age of 12, Lewandowski was sent to Berlin to study at the conservatory where he was expected to become 'the Jewish Mendelssohn.' He became a singerl (lit."little singer"; a child who appeared as a featured soloist or in duets with the chazzan). Lewandowski had no desire to follow Lion into Jewish music until he came under the sway of Hirsch Weintraub (1817–1881) an itinerant synagogue musician. His compositions were some of the first to effectively combine the best of gentile musicianship with traditional oriental elements. The music, consisting of arrangements for choir and string quartets, had a profound Jewish feeling but was rendered in a very sophisticated style. Much of it was based on the best of Mozart and Haydn. Some of the latter's string quartets, for example, were arranged to be sung by Weintraub's choir. This impressed Lewandowski (who had previously rejected the possibility of fusing these two seemingly contrary styles) along with the rest of the Berlin audiences who attended the performances on Weintraub's tour. Lewandowski began writing in the style he would eventually master.

Asher Lion, meanwhile, was forced to come to terms with this sudden evolution in the taste of the Berlin community. But because Lion was virtually untrained in modern composition, he could not read choir parts. After trying different ruses to obtain some understanding of the 'new music', he attempted to cajole Weintraub's quartet to join him and thereby obtain the music. He succeeded in enlisting the tenor, but it turned out that the tenor only knew his own parts! Lion was informed by this same tenor, that Weintraub actually utilized the scores of Sulzer, which were at the time still in manuscript.

Under the assumption that a Sulzer manuscript would be impossible to obtain, he demanded just that from his synagogue committee. When they actually managed to get one and present it to him, a real crisis ensued. Sulzer wrote using a different clef for each part! Soprano, Alto, Tenor, Bass. In desperation Lion eventually turned to the young Lewandowski to help him decipher the notes, finally just giving him the job of directing the choir. Lion realized that Lewandowski was indispensable to him and eventually Lewandowski's position as 'Choir Master' was made permanent—the first time that this title was recognized in synagogue setting.

== America ==
Until the 19th century the roles of the chazzanim in America were similar to the ones they played in the old world during the Middle Ages and the Renaissance; they served as shochtim, mohelim, and as religious schoolteachers. Their primary duties were not musical, although they presided at marriages and burials and chanted the service. There were no ordained Rabbis in the United States until the 1840s when the first major wave of German Jews arrived. Of course they brought with them the reforms that had been initiated in Europe, along with the nascent musical forms. At first, the choir director and the organ had more of an influence on the services than the chazzan.

By mid-century, the situation resembled the one that prevailed in Europe. As in the services being held in Germany and France, the Hebrew texts were abbreviated, many of the prayers were in the national tongue—English. There was an organ and the traditional chanting had been replaced by congregational singing of a mixed choir. It would have been impossible for a traditionally-trained chazzan to lead a Reform service. Isaac Mayer Wise (1819–1900) a founder of the Reform Movement in America, described the old-time chazzan as 'half priest, half beggar, half oracle, half fool, as the occasion demanded.'

The first person to re-establish a pivotal role for the chazzan was Alois Kaiser (1840–1908) Kaiser had been a member of Sulzer's choir as a boy, had conservatory training, and had served as a Cantor in the suburbs of Vienna. Beginning in 1866 he served at the congregation Oheib Shalom in Baltimore. He introduced classical compositions and operatic arias to be used as melodies, and wrote his own compositions in a similar style.

In general, the shortened service, the choir, and the organ made a cantor unnecessary, 'but if a musical leader came along who know how to reshape and revitalize the service, the laity might be swayed by his personality'.

In 1894, Temple Sinai of New Orleans hired the Hungarian-born Cantor Julius Braunfeld.... Cincinnati's K.K. B'nai Yeshurun, which had abolished the traditional office of 'Reader'... ...decided to reverse itself by seeking to employ not an old style chazzan but a contemporary Reform style cantor.

Note the use of the title 'Cantor'. This of course, was the title first used by Salomon Sulzer; Sulzer remained the ideal of what a Cantor ought to be. His Austrian, Hungarian, and German disciples within the American Reform ambiance created a distinctive niche for the temple cantor.

=== Edward Stark ===
Cantor Edward Stark (1856–1913) was one of these disciples. Stark served San Francisco's Emanu-El from 1893 through the following two decades. Stark's father, Cantor Joseph Stark, had trained in Vienna with Sulzer and transmitted the legacy to his son. On the West Coast, Edward Stark (1856–1913) proceeded in much the same way. He and his congregations expected excellent performances from the non-Jewish singers hired for the choir. He supplemented his own work with the new compositions of Sulzer. Like the European synagogue masters, he adapted music of Haydn, Gounod, Schubert, and Mendelssohn, as well as anthems from the Protestant tradition. Sulzer's works were frequently included in services conducted by American Cantors at this time, along with works of their own. The prominence that music had, and the combination of the cantor's solo work, the choral numbers, and congregational singing, made the services at Reform temples unique within the American Jewish scene.

Here is Cantor Stark's job description as it appeared in the "Bylaws of the Congregation Emanu-El"

Article II. Duties of the Cantor. Section I. The Cantor shall be present on all occasions of divine service at the proper time. Section 2. He shall attend all funerals and read the service at the house of mourning at the request of the family. Section 3. He shall be assigned a class in the Religious School as teacher, by the Superintendent and School Committee. Section 4. He shall be director of the choir and perform such other duties that the Board of directors may prescribe.

All for $4,500 a year.

=== A Hymnal ===
The creation of the Society of American Cantors in 1897 was partly in order to facilitate the composition of a hymnal for the UAHC (Union of American Hebrew Congregations). The first Union Hymnal (1897) they created featured abundant hymns, English translations of Hebrew prayers, adaptations of Protestant "favorites", and rearrangements of European classical music used as settings. The Central Conference of American Rabbis endorsed its use in 1903 "so that it may in reality become what it was intended to be, a bond of union for all congregations throughout the land."

The role of the cantor in the Reform movement had entirely changed in the hundred years since Israel Jacobson founded his school in Seesen. Though the cantor's relationship to the new synagogue had been tenuous—at times eliminated altogether—CCAR's endorsement of the Union Hymnal also endorsed the role of the modern cantor: a trained musician familiar with Jewish tradition and sensitive to the needs of his community.
