= Israel Lovy =

Jewish cantor and composer

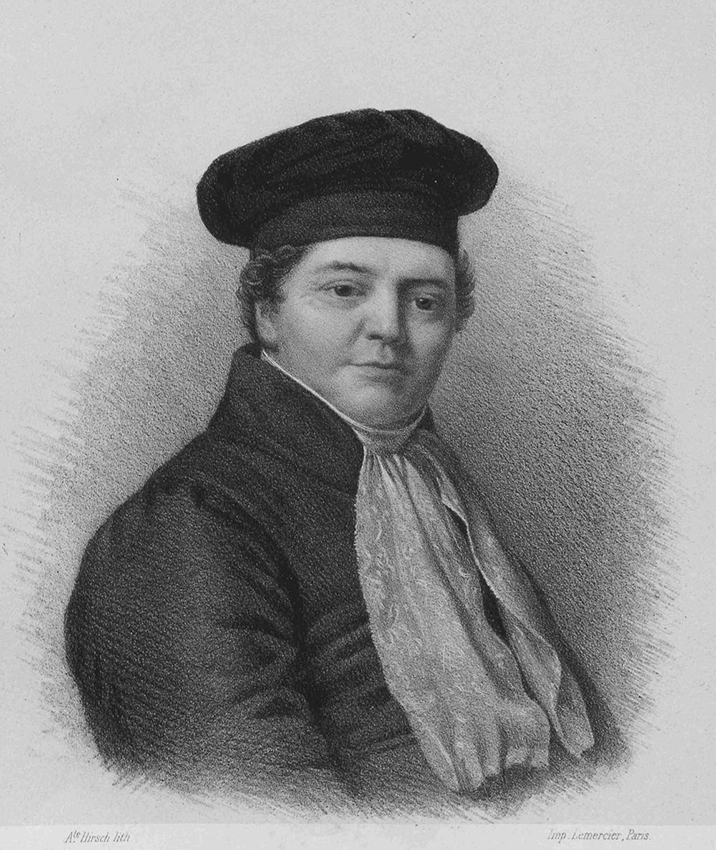
- Portrait of Israel Lovy by Auguste Hirsch

Personal life
- Born: August 31, 1773 Schottland, Polish–Lithuanian Commonwealth
- Died: January 7, 1832 (aged 58) Paris, France
- Buried: Montmartre Cemetery
- Children: Julius Lovy

Religious life
- Religion: Judaism

Jewish leader
- Successor: Samuel Naumbourg
- Synagogue: Temple rue Notre-Dame-de-Nazareth
- Position: Ḥazzan
- Began: 1818
- Ended: 1832

Israel Lovy (31 August 1773 – 7 January 1832), also known as Israel Glogauer and Israel Fürth, was a ḥazzan and composer.

== Biography ==
Israel Lovy was born in Schottland, near Danzig, into a lineage of ḥazzanim from Poland and Pomerania. He received a Talmudic and secular education at Glogau, where his father was ḥazzan. From the age of 13, he acted as assistant ḥazzan in various communities of Moravia, Bohemia, Saxony, and Bavaria. Lovy travelled extensively, visiting the greatest cantors of the time, and studying the works of the greatest masters, especially those of Joseph Haydn and Wolfgang Amadeus Mozart.

From 1799 to 1806, Lovy was employed in Fürth, where he continued his secular and musical education, becoming accomplished in violin, violoncello, and piano, and becoming proficient in French, Italian, and Hebrew. At the request of Duke of Bavaria Maximilian Joseph, Lovy sang the tenor part in a performance of Haydn's The Creation and was allowed to give public concerts in Nuremberg, which at the time was officially off limits to Jews.

After having served for short terms at congregations in Mayence, Strasbourg, and London, he went to Paris in 1818, where he became the ḥazzan of the now-defunct Temple rue Saint-Avoie. In May 1822, he became ḥazzan of the newly founded Temple rue Notre-Dame-de-Nazareth, which dedicated a new synagogue building and introduced the use of an organ and boys' chorus. The synagogue commissioned Lovy to compose a new rendition of the service to complement these reforms. These compositions, along with other earlier works, were published posthumously as Chants religieux, Composés pour les Prières Hébraïques (1862). He received attractive offers from the stage, but the Jewish Consistory of Paris elected him for life and thus induced him to remain as ḥazzan.

He died from a breast disease on 7 January 1832, and is buried in the North-Montmartre Cemetery of Paris. Many of his tunes became popular as far as Poland; and one of them was adopted by Abraham Goldfaden in his opera Shulamith.

== See also ==
- The Reform Jewish cantorate during the 19th century
