= Grand Synagogue of Paris =

Orthodox synagogue in Paris, France

- French: Grande Synagogue de Paris
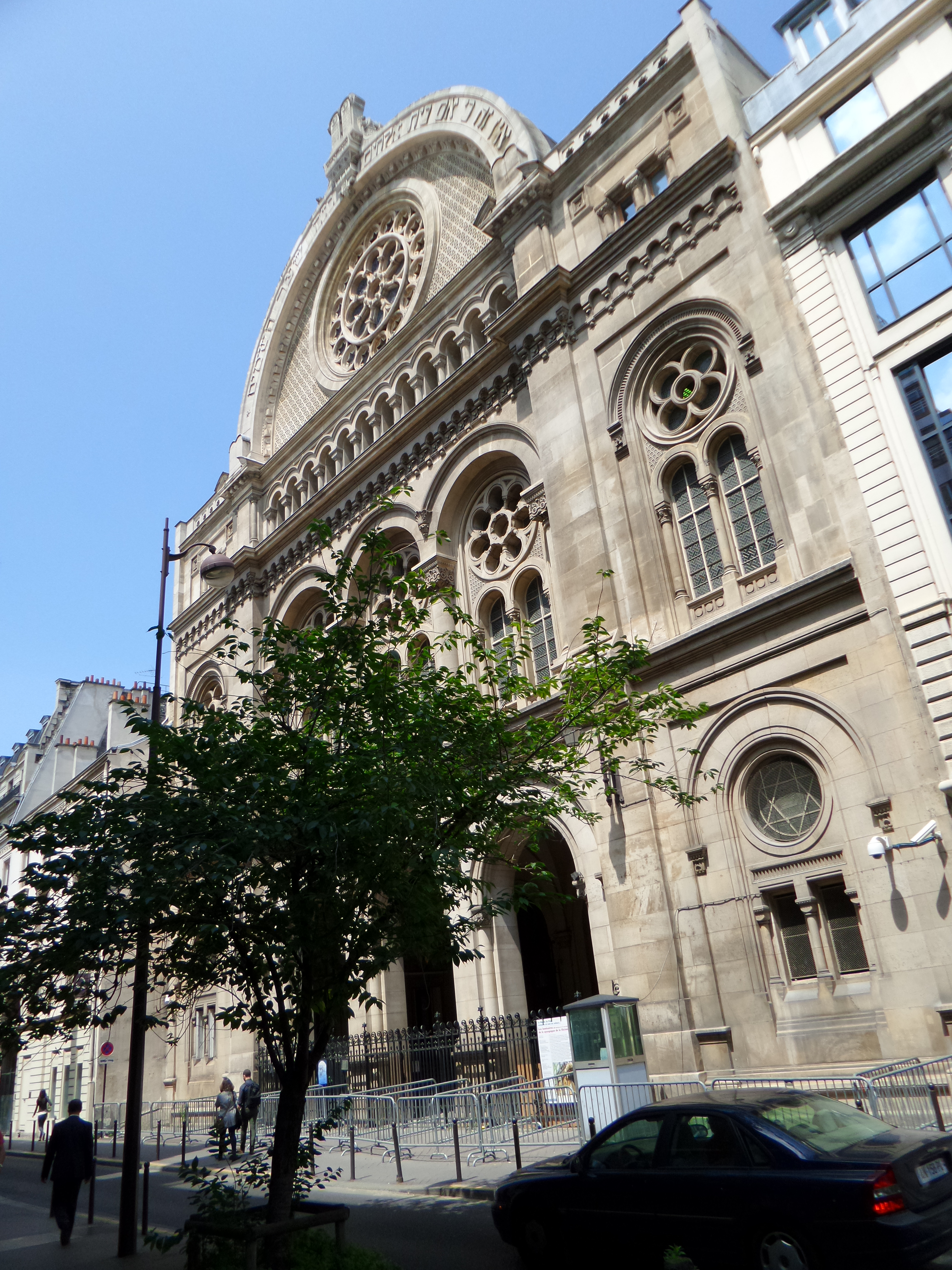
- Façade of the synagogue, in 2014

- Location of the synagogue in Paris

Religion
- Affiliation: Orthodox Judaism
- Rite: Nusach Ashkenaz
- Ecclesiastical or organizational status: Synagogue
- Status: Active

Location
- Location: 44, Rue de la Victoire, IXe arrondissement, Paris
- Country: France
- Interactive map of Grand Synagogue of Paris
- Coordinates: 48°52′32″N 2°20′11″E

Architecture
- Architect: Alfred-Philibert Aldrophe
- Type: Synagogue architecture
- Style: Romanesque Revival; Byzantine Revival
- Funded by: Gustave de Rothschild
- Groundbreaking: 1867
- Completed: 1874

Specifications
- Direction of façade: West
- Capacity: 1,800 worshippers
- Length: 28 metres (92 ft) (nave)
- Height (max): 36 metres (118 ft) (façade)

Website
- lavictoire.org (in French)

Monument historique
- Official name: Synagogue
- Type: Base Mérimée
- Designated: July 8, 1993
- Reference no.: PA00089001

The Grand Synagogue of Paris (French: Grande Synagogue de Paris, pronounced [ɡʁɑ̃d sinaɡɔɡ də paʁi]), generally known as Synagogue de la Victoire (French pronunciation: [sinaɡɔɡ də la viktwaʁ]; English: Synagogue of Victory) or Grande Synagogue de la Victoire (English: Grand Synagogue of Victory), is an Orthodox Jewish congregation and synagogue, located at 44, Rue de la Victoire, in the IXe arrondissement of Paris, France.

Since its establishment in 1874, the synagogue has served as the official seat of the chief rabbi of Paris; with the Synagogue de Nazareth previously being the seat. The synagogue building was classified as a monument historique on July 8, 1993. With a capacity of 1,800 worshippers, it is the second largest synagogue in Europe, after the Dohány Street Synagogue in Budapest.

The congregation worships in the Ashkenazi rite.

== History ==
In the 1800s, the number of Jewish people significantly increased in France, including Paris, as a result of the French Revolution. By 1861 over 30,000 Jews lived in Paris. The earlier synagogues, built in Le Marais, were too small to accommodate the growing congregations. Gustave de Rothschild sought and was granted permission by Emperor Napoleon III to build a new larger synagogue. The city of Paris offered a plot of land in the business district, and de Rothschild funded construction of the synagogue.

The building was designed by Alfred-Philibert Aldrophe (architect of the Versailles Synagogue and the Enghien-les-Bains commune) in the Romanesque Revival style, embellished with Byzantine Revival frills. Construction commenced in 1867, the synagogue was inaugurated in 1874, and opened to the general public in 1875. Despite initial plans that the synagogue face east on Rue de la Saint-Georges, opposite two Roman Catholic churches, Empress Eugénie, the Catholic wife of Napoleon III, opposed plans and the synagogue was faced west, on the narrower Rue de la Victoire.

The inscription in Hebrew at the entrance is a verse from Genesis 28,17 : "This is none other than the House of God, the very gateway to Heaven", the same as is found on the entrance to the synagogue of Reims and that of Bar-le-Duc. The interior has a number of religious inscriptions above the doors. In the choir pulpit is written in French the names of the prophets. Above the Torah Ark is engraved with the words Hebrew: ה 'ניסי, lit. 'The Lord-is-my-banner' (Exodus 17:15). The synagogue also includes a series of twelve stained glass windows symbolising the Tribes of Israel.

The choir is separated from the assembly by a balustrade and the bimah.

Every year, the Sunday before Rosh Hashanah, a ceremony in remembrance of the Martyrs of the Deportation takes place, that is televised on France 2.

== Notable members ==
- Leon Blum, a former Prime Minister of France, married in the synagogue
- Ernest Cahen, organist, played the Merklin organ of the synagogue
- Alfred Dreyfus, French artillery officer who was the centre of the Dreyfus affair, married in the synagogue
- Theodor Herzl, journalist, lawyer, writer, playwright and political activist who was the father of modern political Zionism
- Meyer Jaïs (also written "Meir" Jaïs), the first Sephardic Chief Rabbi of Paris
- Zadoc Kahn, Chief Rabbi, officiated at Dreyfus' wedding, and later advocated for Dreyfus' freedom

=== Miscellaneous ===
In November 2013, French baritone David Serero performed a concert in the synagogue.

== Gallery ==
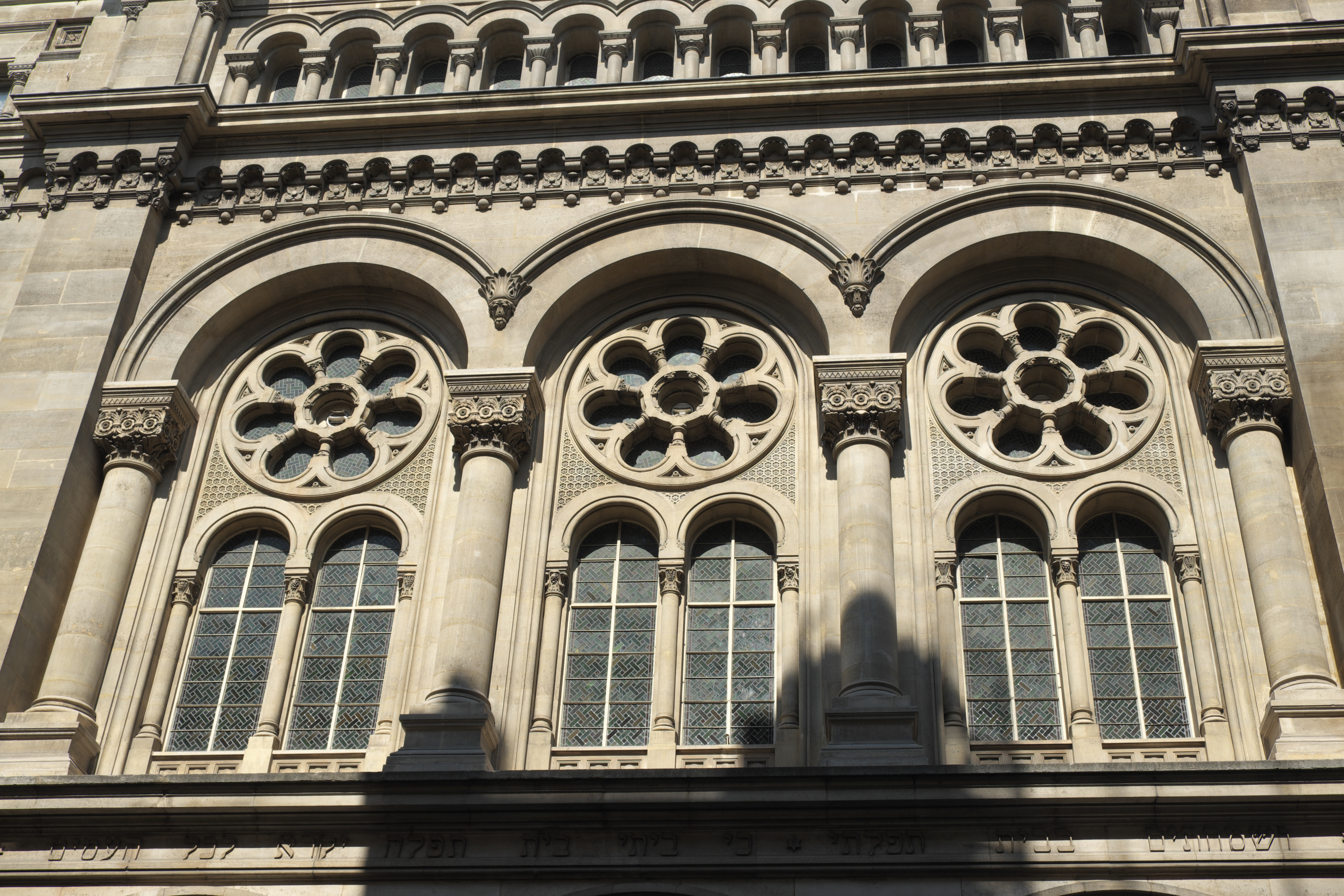
The synagogue façade

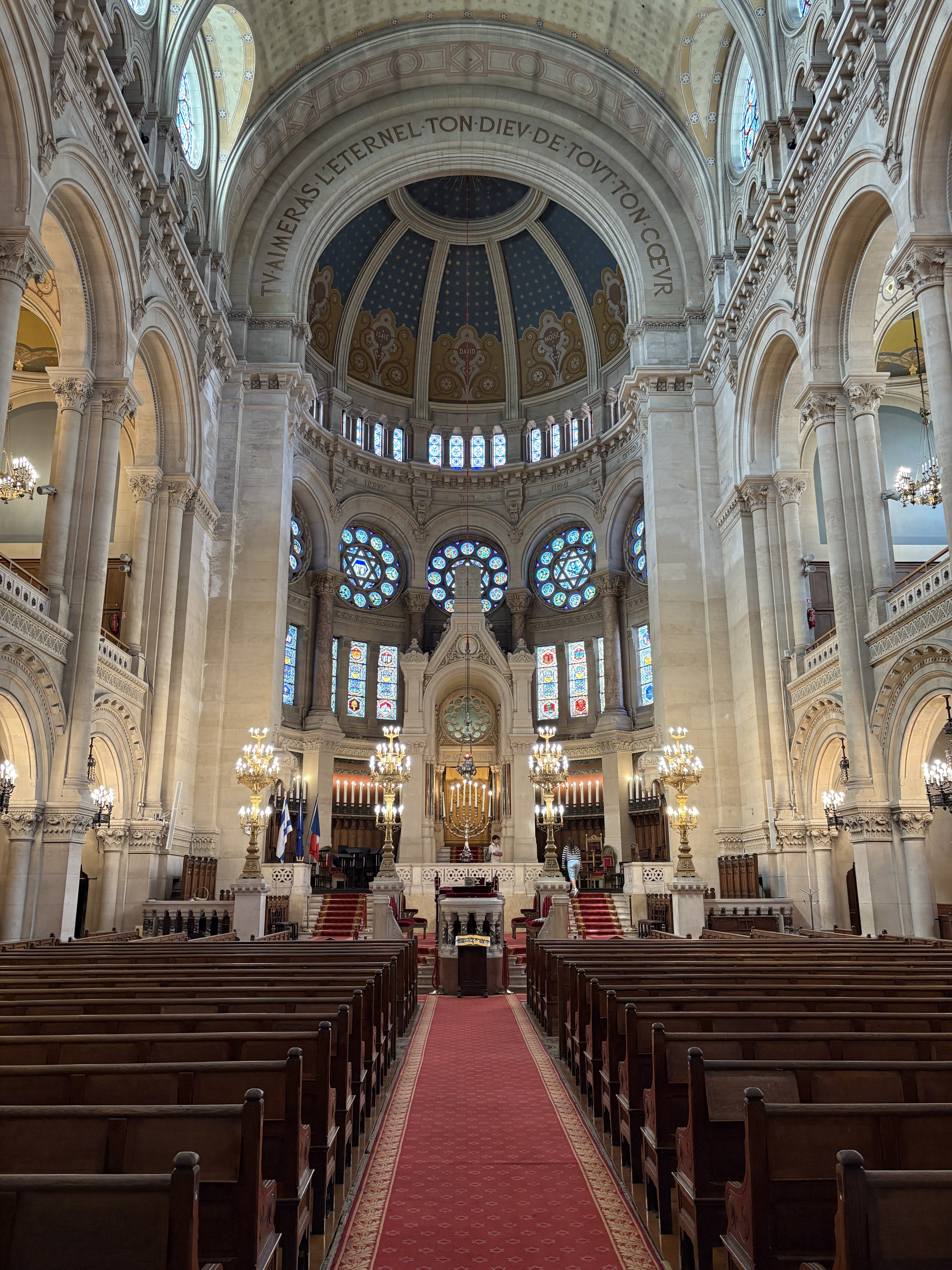
Sanctuary of the Grand Synagogue of Paris facing east

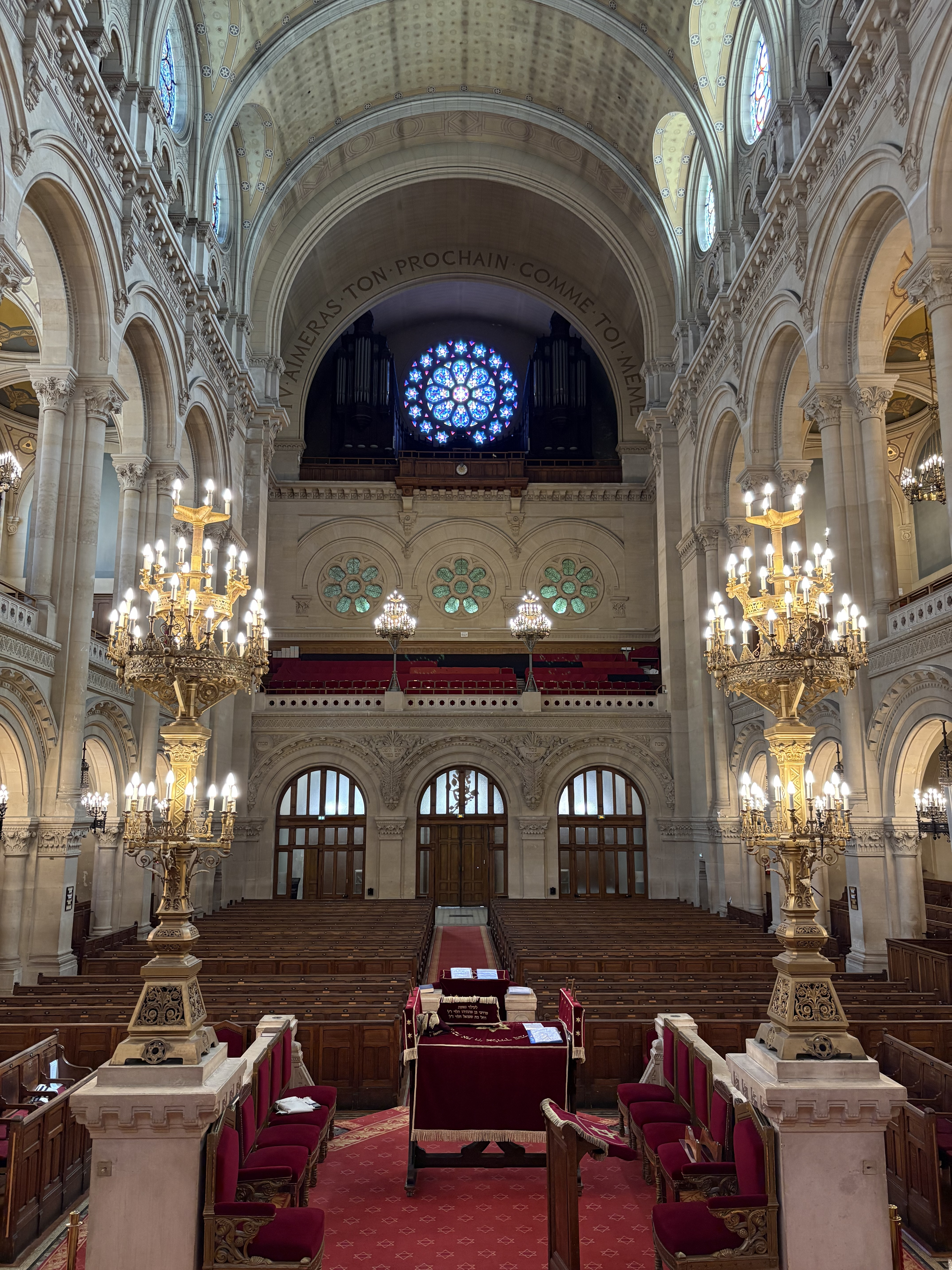
Sanctuary of the Grand Synagogue of Paris facing west

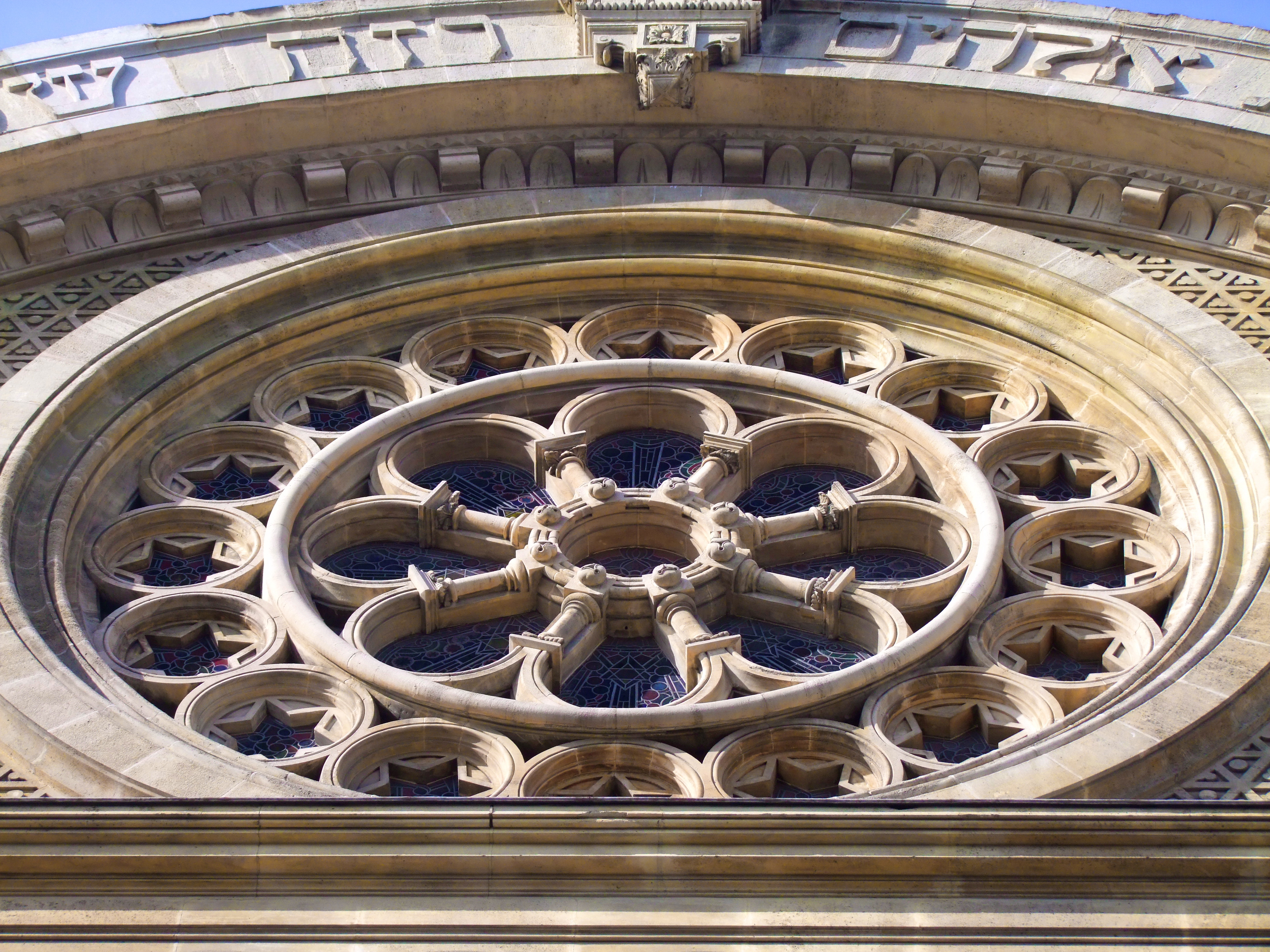
Detail of the rosette on the façade

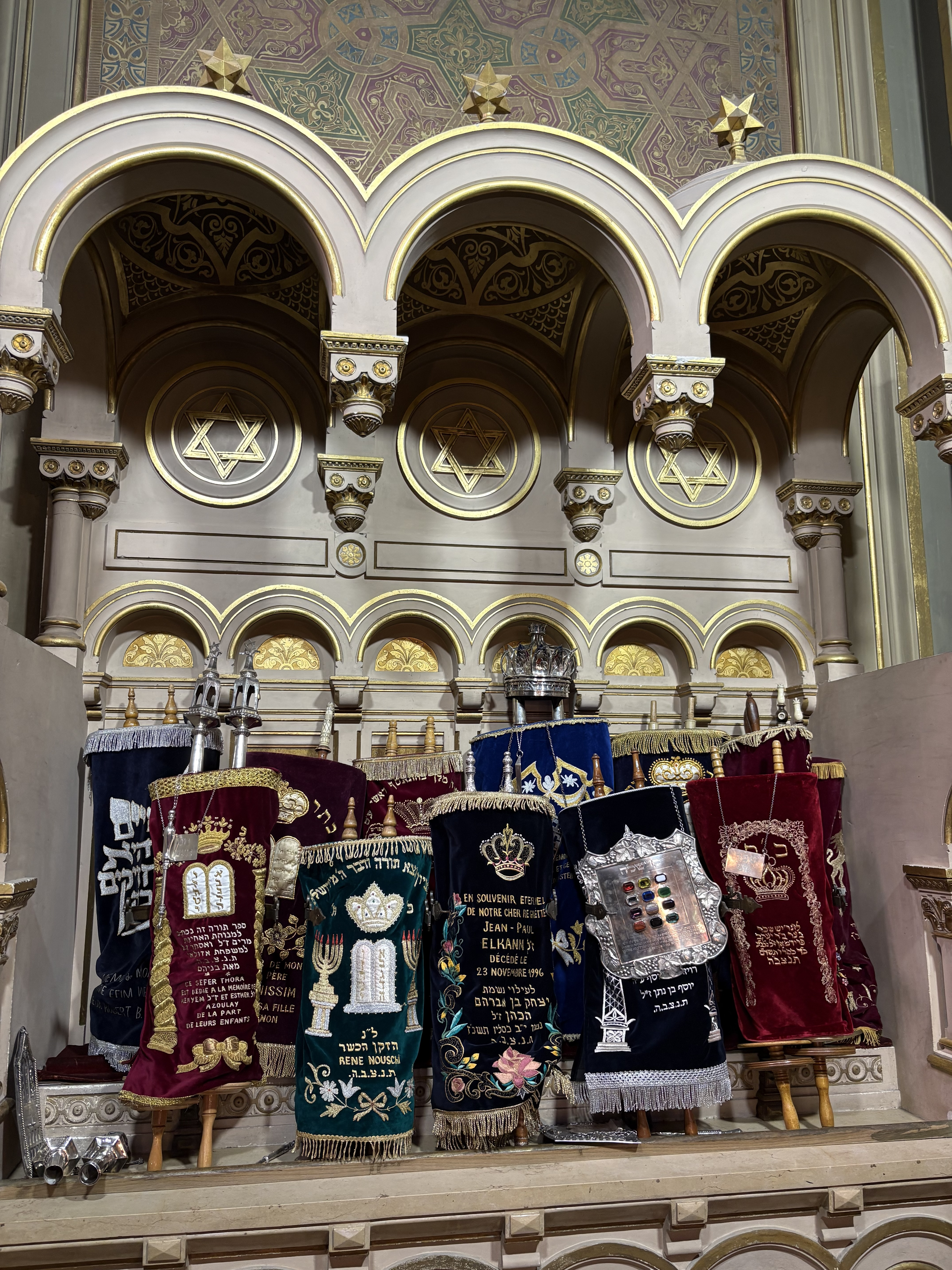
Torah scrolls inside the ark of the Grand Synagogue of Paris

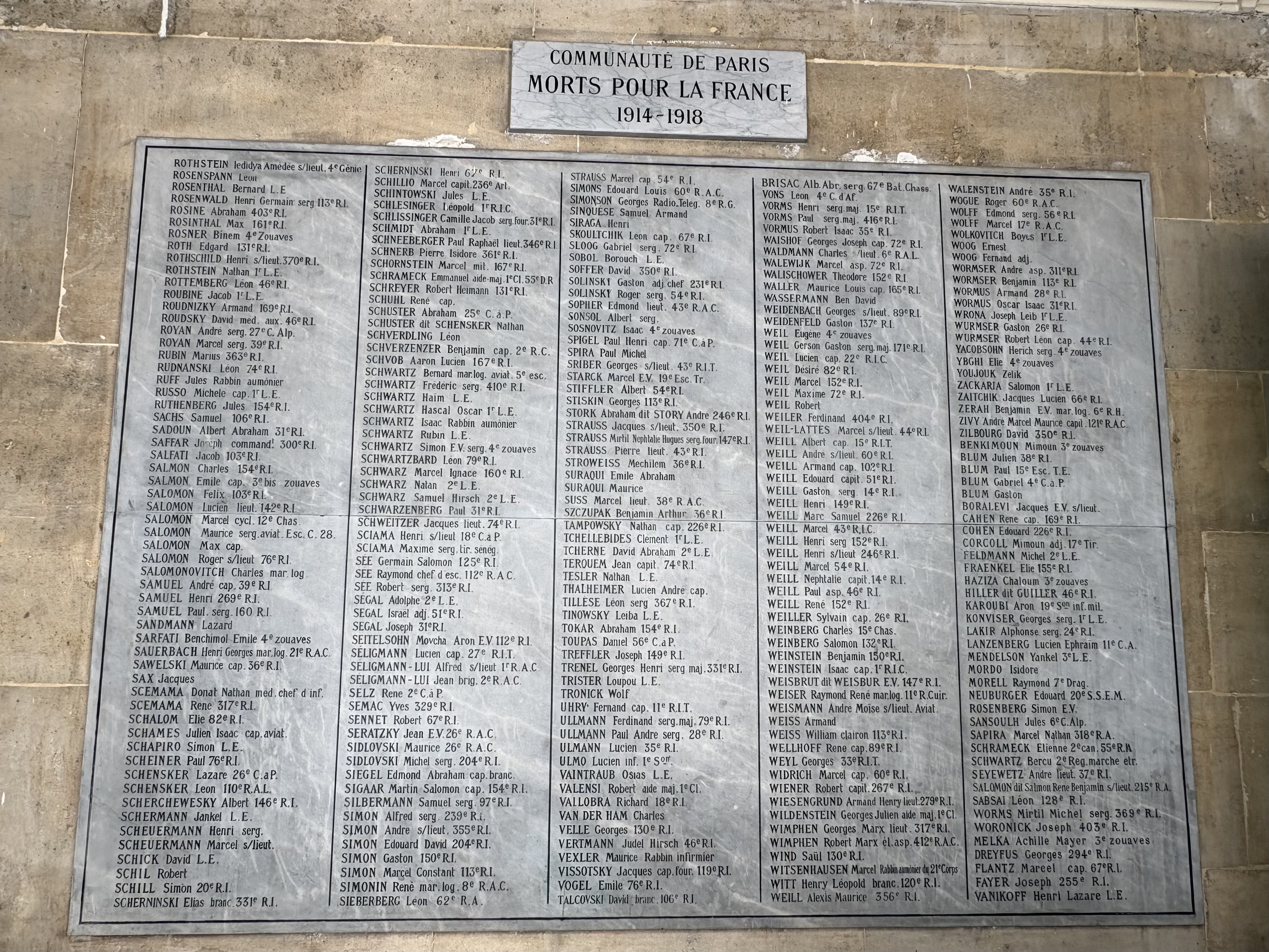
A plaque at the Grand Synagogue of Paris showing a portion of the members who died in World War I

== See also ==
- History of the Jews in France
- List of synagogues in France
