= Ernest Cahen =

French organist and composer (1828-1893)

- Born: 14 August 1828; Paris
- Died: 8 November 1893 (aged 65); Paris
- Occupation(s): Composer; Organist

Ernest Cahen (18 August 1828, Paris – 8 November 1893, Paris) was a 19th-century French pianist, organist, music teacher and composer.

== Life ==
After studying at the Conservatoire de Paris, in 1849 Cahen won the second Grand Prix de Rome for composition (the first Grand Prix wasn't awarded that year). He worked at the Merklin organ of the Grand Synagogue of Paris and at the Cavaillé-Coll organ of the Synagogue de Nazareth.

Cahen composed several operettas, including Le Calfat (1858) and Le Souper de Mezzelin (1859), presented at the Théâtre des Folies-Nouvelles in Paris.
