= Hôtel de Marigny =

State guest house in Paris, France

Coordinates: 48°52′14″N 2°18′55″E

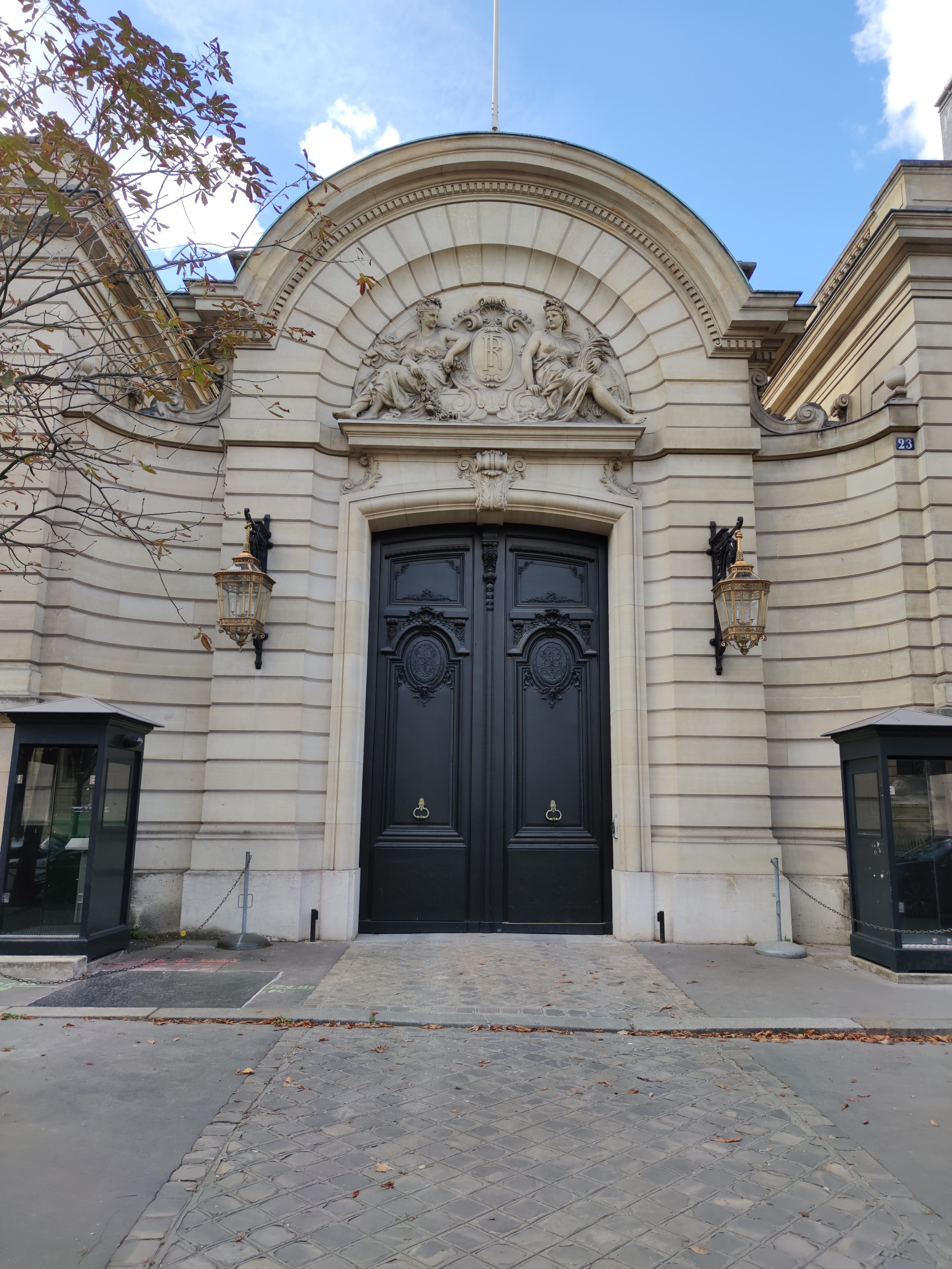
The main portal along the street

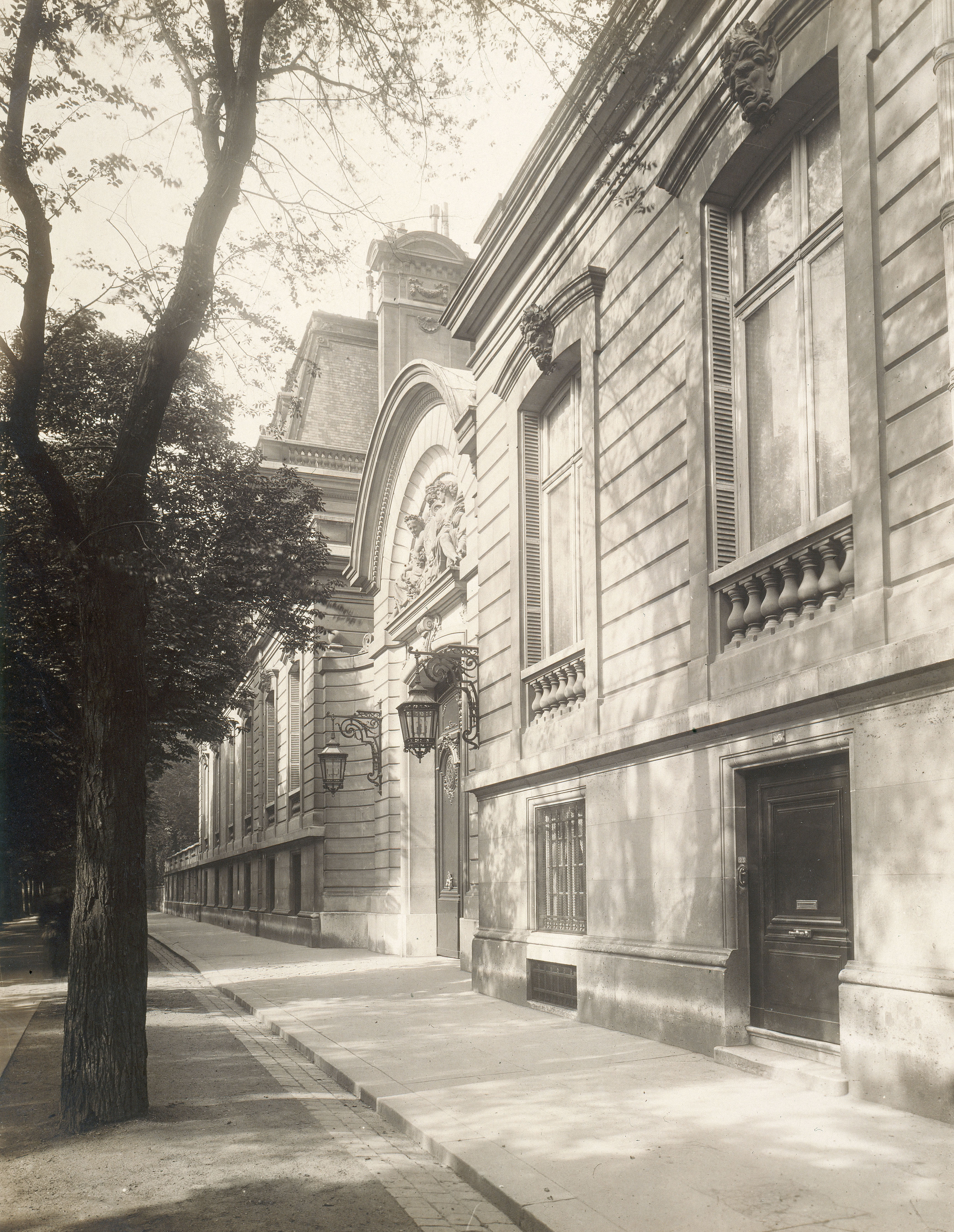
View toward the portal in 1920

The Hôtel de Marigny (French pronunciation: [otɛl d(ə) maʁiɲi]) is an hôtel particulier at 23 Avenue de Marigny in the 8th arrondissement of Paris, France, across the street from the Élysée Palace. It is used as a state guest house for state visitors to France and has been the property of the French government since 1972. Previously, state guests were housed at the Grand Trianon from 1959.

== History ==
Its history dates back to 15 June 1869, when Baron Gustave de Rothschild paid the Duchesse de Bauffremont 2,700,000 francs for two townhouses, at 21 Avenue de Marigny and 14 Rue du Cirque, with a total floorspace of approximately 40,000 square feet (3,700 m^{2}).

In 1872, the Baron decided to combine the two buildings into a single property and to erect additional buildings on part of the site. On 17 May 1879, he acquired the townhouse at 13 Avenue de Marigny. Extensive work was carried out on the site from 1873 onwards, lasting for nearly 10 years, under the direction of the Baron's architect, Alfred-Philibert Aldrophe.

In 1971, the Rothschild family parted with the property. President Georges Pompidou had it bought to be turned into a state house. During a 1978 state visit, Romanian President Nicolae Ceaușescu stole millions of francs worth of decorations, including "ornaments, paintings, lamps and vases", even tearing off the "gold taps".

Today, the Hôtel de Marigny comprises a main building with one two-story wing at right angles, standing above a vast basement area for the domestic services. The main emphasis is on the monumental central part of the façade: the entrance to the main lobby comprises two lower-level reception areas beneath the raised ground-floor, while the upper portion contains four Corinthian columns framing a bay window and two niches, bearing a frame and sculpted frontispiece of the same provenance.
