= Alfred-Philibert Aldrophe =

French architect (1834–1895)

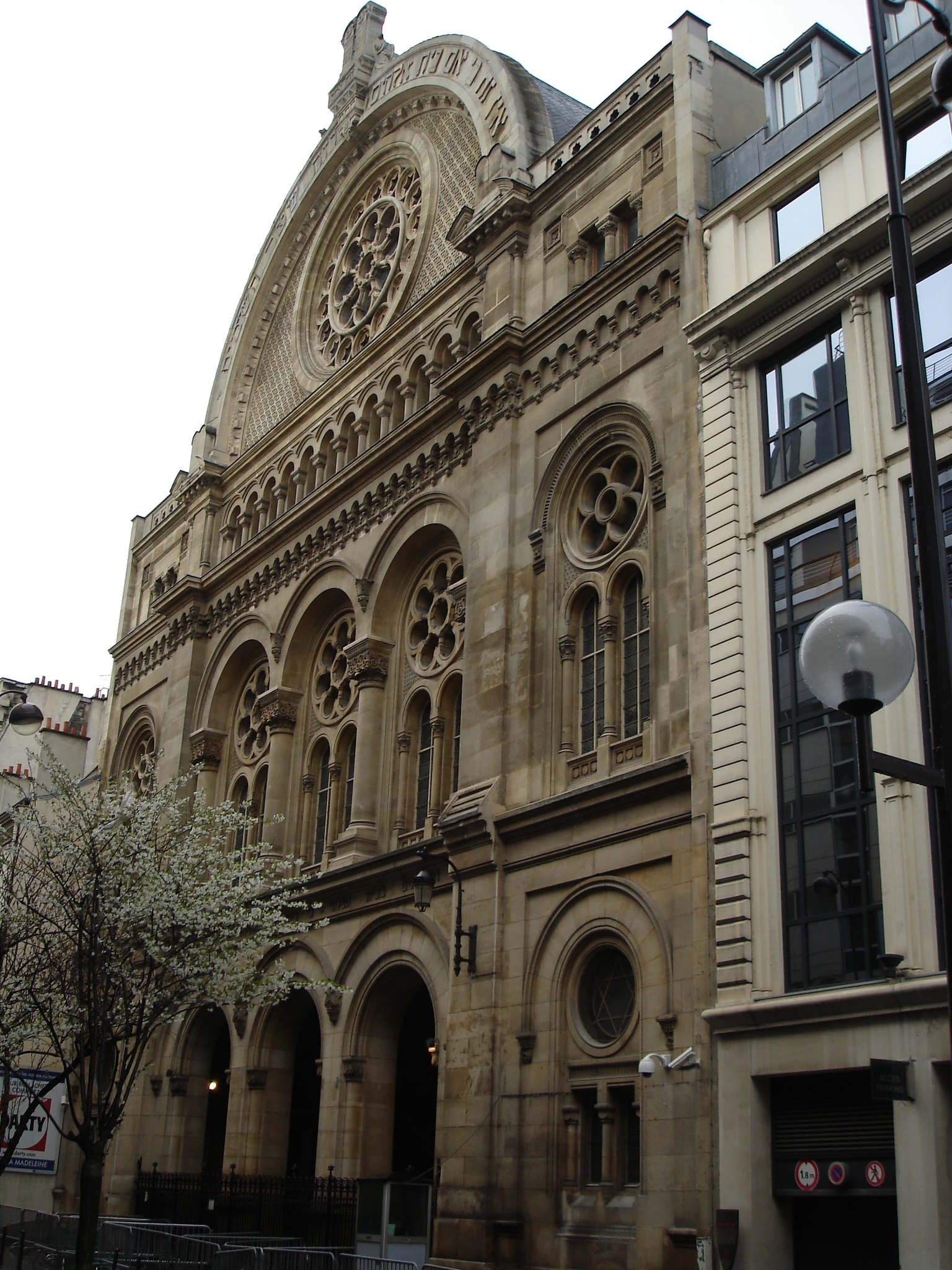
Grand Synagogue of Paris, 1874

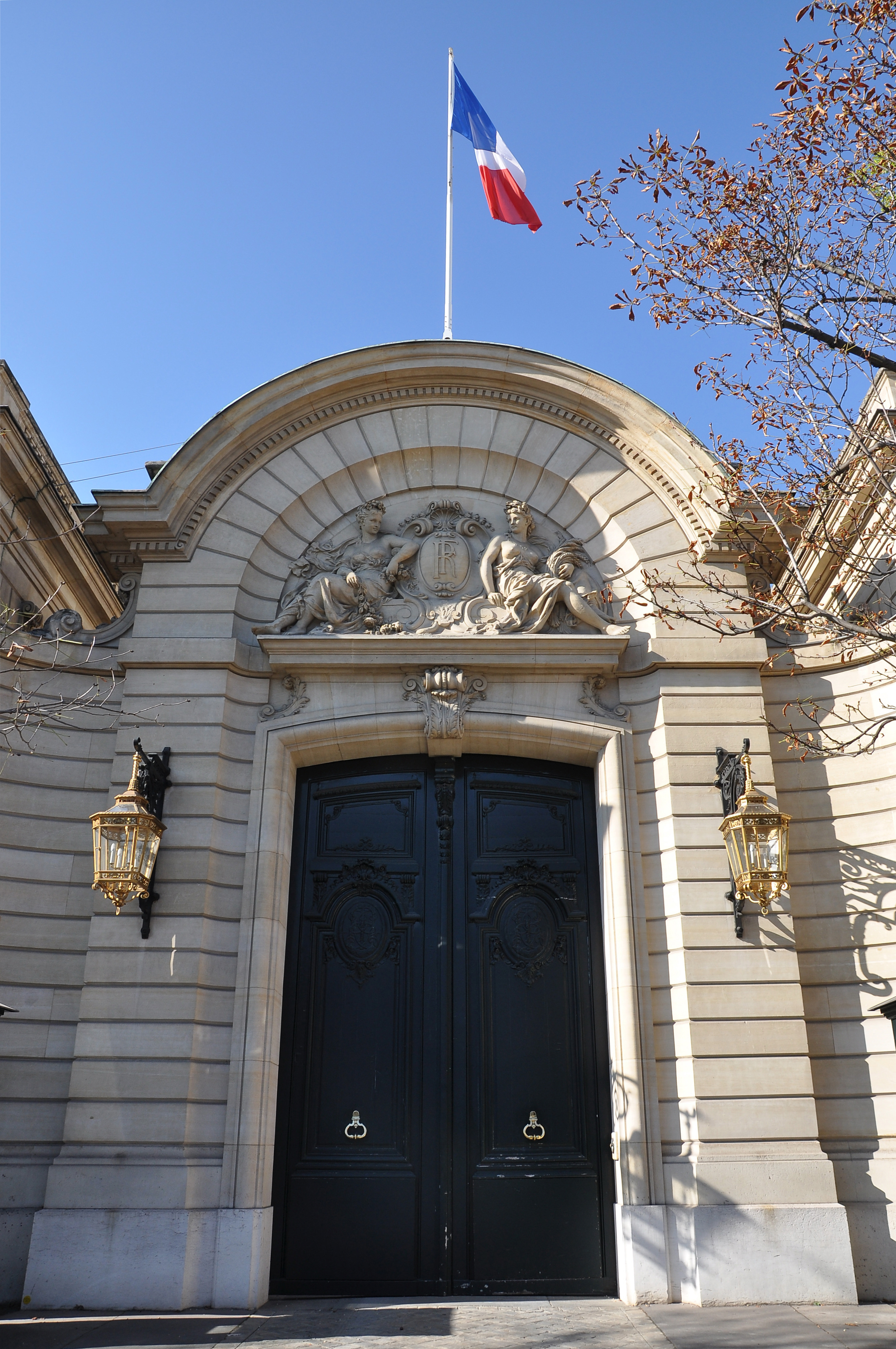
Hôtel de Marigny

Alfred-Philibert Aldrophe (7 February 1834 – 29 October 1895) was a French architect.

== Biography ==
Born in Paris, he worked on the Great Exhibitions held in the city in 1855 and 1867. As the architect of the Consistory of Paris, in 1867 he began construction of the Grand Synagogue of Paris which opened in 1874, and became available for public worship in 1875. The Synagogue is in a Romanesque style, with flowers, embellished with Byzantine ornamentation. In 1886, he also built the Versailles Synagogue, in the novel style.

He became the architect of Gustave de Rothschild, and built for him, between 1873 and 1883, his mansion, Hôtel de Marigny (now state property, annexed to the Palais de l'Élysée). After an initial phase of work, from 1873, a wing back pierced by a gate giving access to the courtyard was erected on the Avenue de Marigny, and another building was constructed along the street. Along this building, located in back yard, were Corinthian columns and a pediment carved from the former Hotel Choiseul. The Hotel de Marigny consists of a main building and a wing back to two levels above a basement housing services. The access door to the vestibule incorporates two sockets on the ground floor, while in the upper part, four Corinthian columns framing a bay and two niches and support coaching and pediment.

Aldrophe also built for Gustave de Rothschild, in 1880, the Hayes Castle known as The Versini, Saint-Maximin, near Chantilly, Oise.

He built the School Gustave de Rothschild, Rue Claude Bernard in the 5th arrondissement of Paris.

In 1873, recommended by the Rothschilds, he built the Hotel Thiers, place Saint-Georges in the 9th arrondissement, today Dosne-Thiers Foundation, Institute of France. Pedimented facades topped by a balustrade inspired Louis XVI popular style around 1870.

In 1894, he proposed a series of projects for an elegant mansion, adorned with Ionic columns of colossal order for Mr. Alphonse Falco on a plot 39, avenue Henri-Martin in Paris 16th Arrondissement.

In the same year, King Leopold II of Belgium appointed Aldrophe as the architect of the Palace of the Colonies, a museum building for the colonial section of the 1897 World Exhibition in Tervuren. Aldrophe died at Paris in 1895 and his plans for Tervuren was continued by Ernest Acker.

== Sources ==
- Dominique Jarrassé: Guide du patrimoine juif parisien. Parigramme, Paris 2003, ISBN 978-2-84096-247-2
- Jean Colson/Marie-Christine Lauroa (Hrsg.): Dictionnaire des monuments de Paris. Editions Hervas, Paris 2003 (1. Auflage 1992), ISBN 2-84334-001-2
- Marcel Luwel: 'Geschiedenis van de Tentoonstelling van 1897 te Tervuren'. In M. Luwel & M. Bruneel-Hye de Crom (Eds.), Tervueren 1897. Tervuren: Musée royal de l’Afrique centrale, page 6.
