= Frédéric Masson =

French historian (1847–1923)

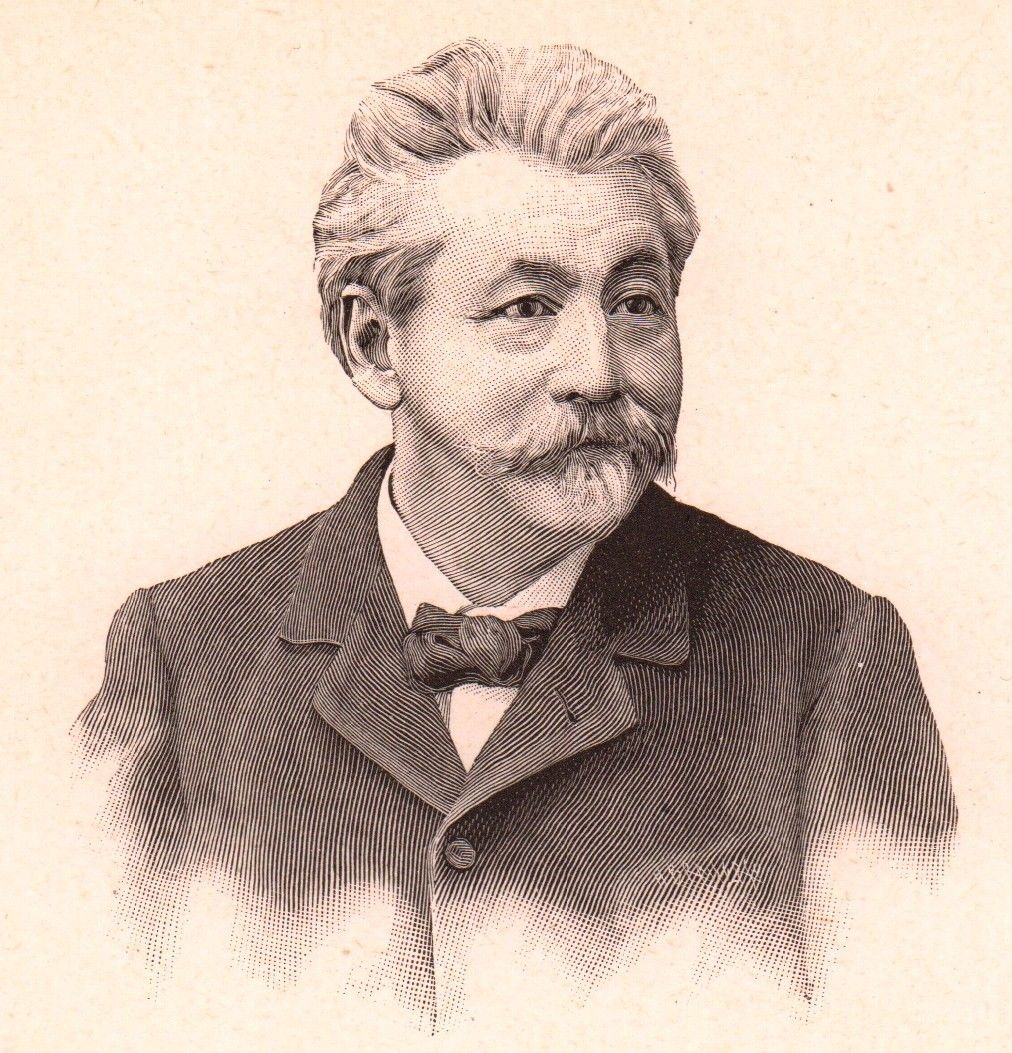
Frédéric Masson.

Louis Claude Frédéric Masson (8 March 1847, Paris – 19 February 1923, Paris) was a French historian.

== Life and career ==
His father, Francis Masson, a solicitor, was killed on 23 June 1848 when he was a major in the garde nationale. Young Masson was educated at the college of Sainte Barbe, and at the lycée Louis-le-Grand, and then travelled in Germany and in England. From 1869 to 1880 he was librarian at the Foreign Office.

At first he devoted himself to the history of diplomacy, and published between 1877 and 1884 several volumes connected with that subject. Later he published a number of more or less curious memoirs illustrating the history of the Revolution and of the empire.

But he is best known for his books connected with Napoleon. In Napoléon inconnu (1895), Masson, together with Guido Biagi, brought out the unpublished writings (1786-1793) of the future emperor. These were notes, extracts from historical, philosophical and literary books, and personal reflections in which one can watch the growth of the ideas later carried out by the emperor with modifications necessitated by the force of circumstances and his own genius. But this was only one in a remarkable series:

- Joséphine de Beauharnais, 1763-1796 (1898)
- Joséphine, impératrice et reine (1899)
- Joséphine répudiée 1809-1814 (1901)
- L'Impératrice Marie Louise (1902)
- Napoléon et les femmes (1894)
- Napoléon et sa famille (9 vols., 1897-1907)
- Napoléon et son fils (1904)
- Autour de l'Île d'Elbe (1908).

These works abound in details and amusing anecdotes, which throw much light on the events and men of the time, laying stress on the personal, romantic and dramatic aspects of history. The author was made a member of the Académie française in 1903. From 1886 to 1889 he edited the review Arts and Letters, published in London and New York.

A bibliography of his works, including anonymous ones and those under an assumed name, has been published by Georges Vicaire (Manuel de l'amateur des livres du XIX siècle, tome v., 1904). Napoléon et les femmes was translated into English as Napoleon and the Fair Sex (1894). Another translation by J. M. Howell appeared under the title: Napoleon: lover and husband (1894).

His personal library, his papers, his collection of paintings and objects about Napoléon are conserved now in the Fondation Dosne-Thiers, 27 place Saint-Georges, 75009 Paris (France).
