= Fondation Dosne-Thiers =

Parisian Library

Coordinates: 48°52′43″N 2°20′15″E

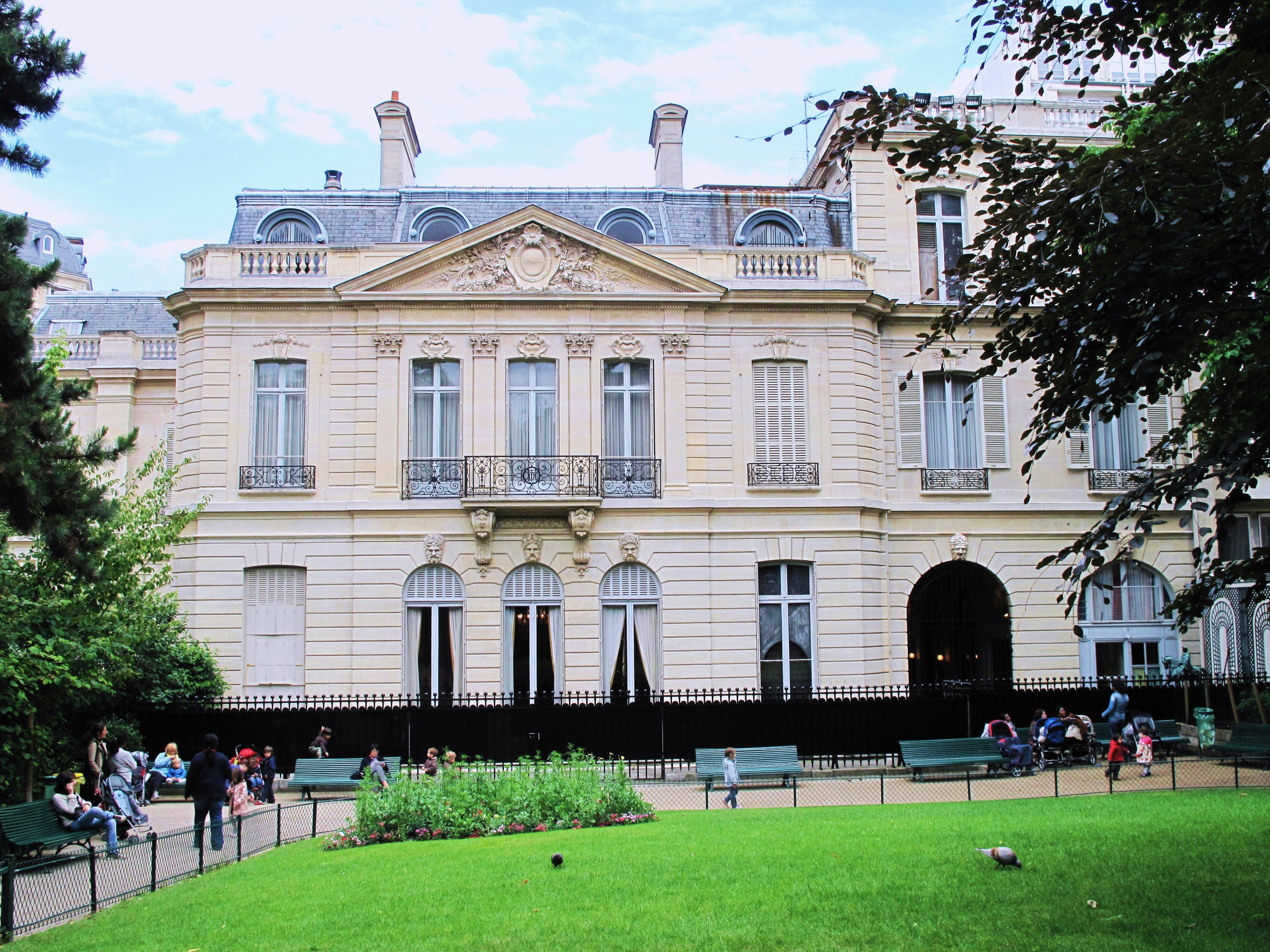
Fondation Dosne-Thiers

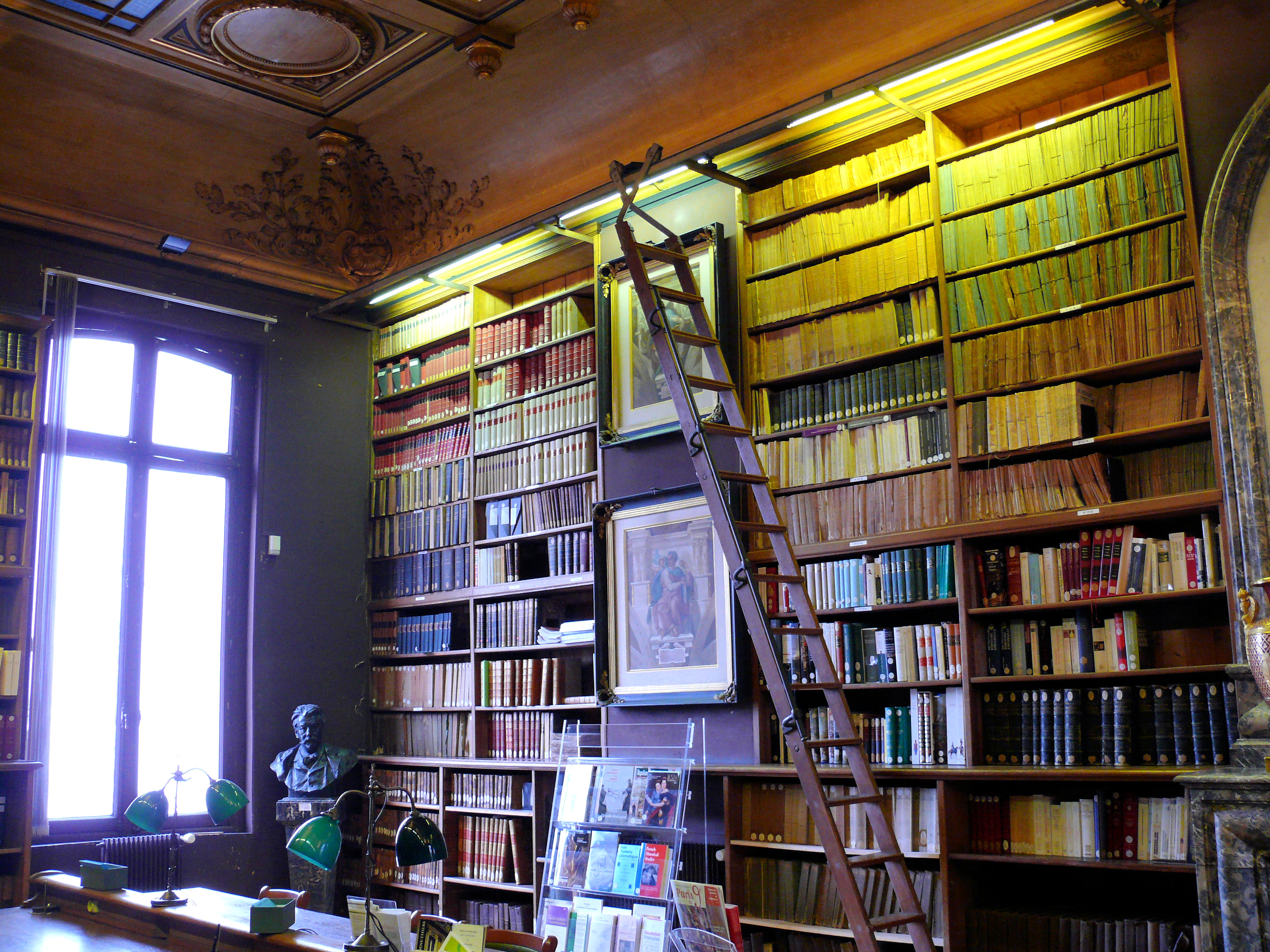
Reading room

The Fondation Dosne-Thiers is a history library located in the 9th arrondissement of Paris at 27, place St-Georges, Paris, France. It is open to researchers who obtain recommendations from a member of the Institut de France.

== Description ==
The foundation is housed within the Hôtel Dosne-Thiers, a former home of historian Louis-Adolphe Thiers (1797–1877) built in 1873 by architect Alfred-Philibert Aldrophe (1834–1895) to replace Thiers' earlier mansion on the site, which was destroyed in the Paris Commune. "Dosne" in its name refers to Eurydice Dosne, Thiers' friend, benefactor and probable mistress, or to her daughter Elise, Thiers' wife. It was bequeathed to the Institut de France in 1905.

The Fondation contains a large collection of books and objets d'art assembled by Thiers, and is notable for its superb library of French history and a substantial body of Napoleonic memorabilia which may be viewed by prior request. The library also displays temporary exhibits.

The library, the Bibliothèque Thiers, specializes in the history of France from 1789–1900, including its general, political, military, social, and administrative history. It holds one of the world's largest collections on the First French Empire bequeathed by the historian and academician Frédéric Masson. All told, the library contains about 150,000 volumes, plus about 30,000 prints and cartoons, 1,000 drawings, and more than 3,000 manuscripts.

== See also ==
- List of libraries in France
- List of museums in Paris
