= Versailles Synagogue =

Synagogue in Versailles, France

- French: Synagogue de Versailles
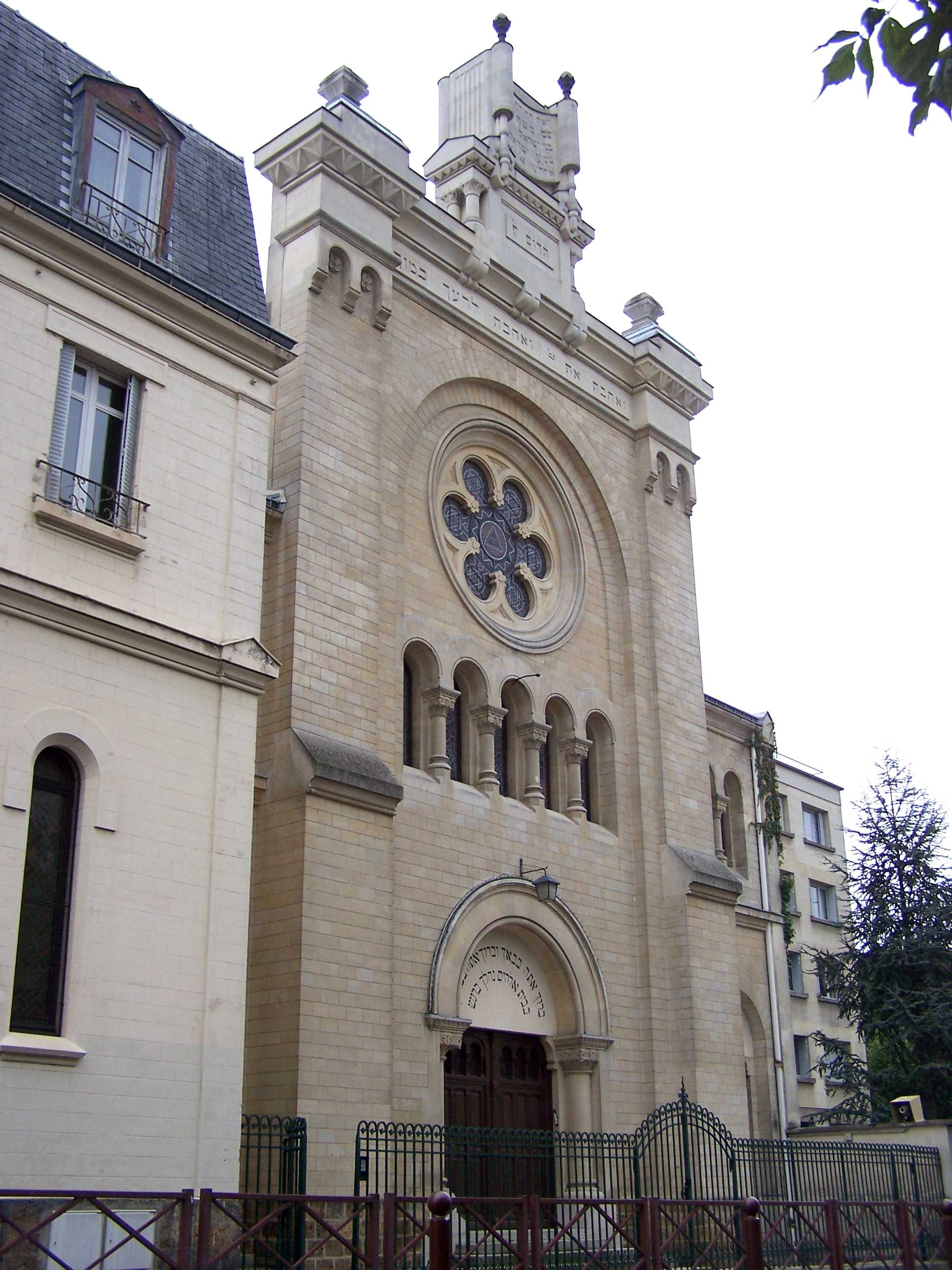
- The synagogue in 2006

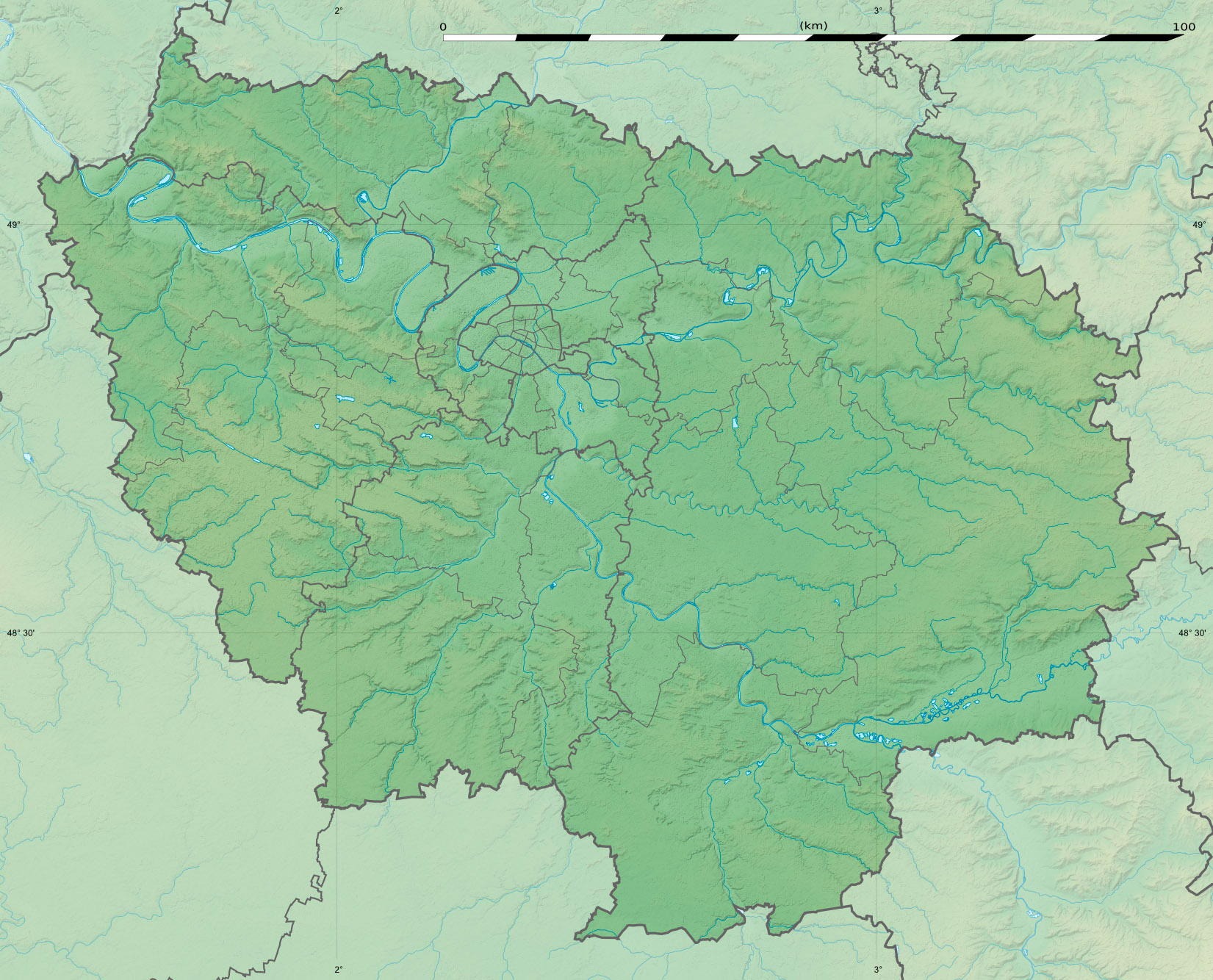
- Location of the synagogue in the Île-de-France region

Religion
- Affiliation: Judaism
- Rite: Nusach Ashkenaz (former); Nusach Sefard (current)
- Ecclesiastical or organisational status: Synagogue
- Status: Active

Location
- Location: 10, rue Albert Joly in Versailles, Yvelines, Île-de-France
- Country: France
- Coordinates: 48°48′38″N 2°08′12″E

Architecture
- Architect: Alfred Aldrophe
- Type: Synagogue architecture
- Style: Romanesque Revival
- Founder: Mrs Furtado Heine
- Established: c. 1780s (as a congregation)
- Completed: 1886

Specifications
- Direction of façade: North
- Materials: Stone

Monument historique
- Official name: Synagogue
- Type: Base Mérimée
- Criteria: Patrimoine architectural (Mérimée) (in French)
- Designated: 27 January 2010
- Reference no.: PA78000027

The Versailles Synagogue (French: Synagogue de Versailles) is a Jewish congregation and synagogue, located at 10, rue Albert Joly in Versailles in the Yvelines department, in the Île-de-France region of France. Built between 1884 and 1886 by the architect Alfred-Philibert Aldrophe, it was inaugurated in 1886, and is one of the oldest purpose-built synagogues in the Île-de-France region. Mrs Furtado Heine provided significant financial support to the establishment of the synagogue.

The synagogue was listed as a monument historique on 27 January 2010. Having historically worshipped in the Ashkenazi rite, the congregation now worships in the Sephardic rite.

== Description ==
From an architectural standpoint, the Ashkenazi synagogue is classical in style with a massive front buttress and is embellished with Byzantine Revival ornamentation. There is a desire to make an imposing, monument, on whose pediment is a large Sefer Torah replacing what were hitherto discreet symbols of identity in the city.

The facade of the building is north-facing and never gets the sun, neither do windows to the south which is a facing a wall, this is unusual as synagogues are generally more oriented west–east.

Above the portal are carved in Hebrew the following Biblical verses:

"Blessed are you at your coming and blessed art thou in thy going out" (Deuteronomy 28.6)

"Come in turmoil into the house of God" (Psalms 55.15)

And on top of the building:

"Thou shalt love the Lord" (Deuteronomy 11:1)

"Thou shalt love thy neighbor as thyself" (Leviticus 19:18)

The synagogue is in operation (the rabbi is Mr. Beldheb) but now follows the Sephardi rite and the present community is mainly from Morocco. The grandfather of the anthropologist and ethnologist Claude Lévi-Strauss was at one-time the rabbi of this synagogue.

It is possible to visit during certain occasions such as the National Day of Remembrance for Victims and Heroes of the Deportation, when it is open to the public.

To the left of the synagogue is the rabbinic residence.

== Jewish cemetery of Versailles ==
The Jewish cemetery in Versailles is in the same area as the synagogue (Versailles Rive Droite). It is arranged in terraces on a slope surrounded by greenery at 3, rue General Pershing, and contains about 400 graves. The cemetery, which was authorized by King Louis XVI in 1788, is one of the few Jewish cemeteries dating from before the French Revolution. Most date from the 19th century.

There is also a Jewish section in the southwest corner of Cemetery Gonards. There is a tomb bearing the inscription "THE PROMISED LAND TO ITS MEMBERS." "Promised Land" was a Jewish society founded in Paris under the Second French Empire, which met until 1970, whose purpose was to render the last honors to ensure a dignified burial for the poor, to prevent them from ending up buried in a common site. The society had several hundred members who paid originally an annual fee of 15 francs.

== See also ==
- History of the Jews in France
- List of synagogues in France
