= Samuel Naumbourg =

French composer (1817–1880)

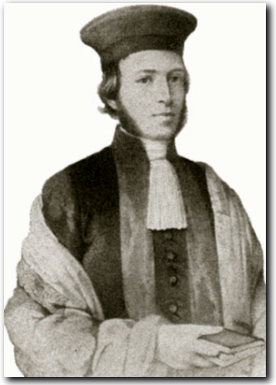
Samuel Naumbourg

Samuel Naumbourg (15 March 1817 – 1 May 1880) was a French composer.

== Career ==
Naumbourg was born in Dennenlohe, Unterschwaningen, Bavaria. After having held the office of chazzan and reader at Besançon and directed the choir of the synagogue at Strasbourg, he was called in 1845 to officiate in the synagogue of the rue Notre-Dame-de-Nazareth at Paris where he became professor of liturgical music at the Séminaire Israélite. Shortly before his death he was elected Officier d'Académie.

The more important of his compositions are: Chants Liturgicals des Grandes Fêtes (Paris, 1847); Zemirot Yisrael, comprising psalms, hymns, and the complete liturgy, from the most remote times to the present day (1864); Shire Qodesh, new collection of religious songs for use in Jewish worship (1864); Aguddat Shirim, collection of religious and popular Hebrew songs, from the most ancient times to the present day (1874); "Shir ha-Shirim Asher li-Shelomoh" (1877), with an essay on the life and works of Solomon de Rossi. The last-mentioned work is dedicated to Baron Edmond de Rothschild, who discovered a portion of the songs of Rossi and who encouraged Naumbourg in his efforts to revive the musical productions of the old master.

He died in Saint-Mandé, near Paris.

== Bibliography ==
- Zadoc Kahn, Souvenirs et Regrets
- Winter and Wünsche, Jüdische Litteratur, iii. 527
- Eliyahu Schleifer (ed.): Samuel Naumbourg. The Cantor of French Jewish Emancipation (Berlin: Hentrich & Hentrich, 2012); ISBN 978-3-942271-88-2
