= Synagogue de Nazareth =

Orthodox synagogue in Paris, France

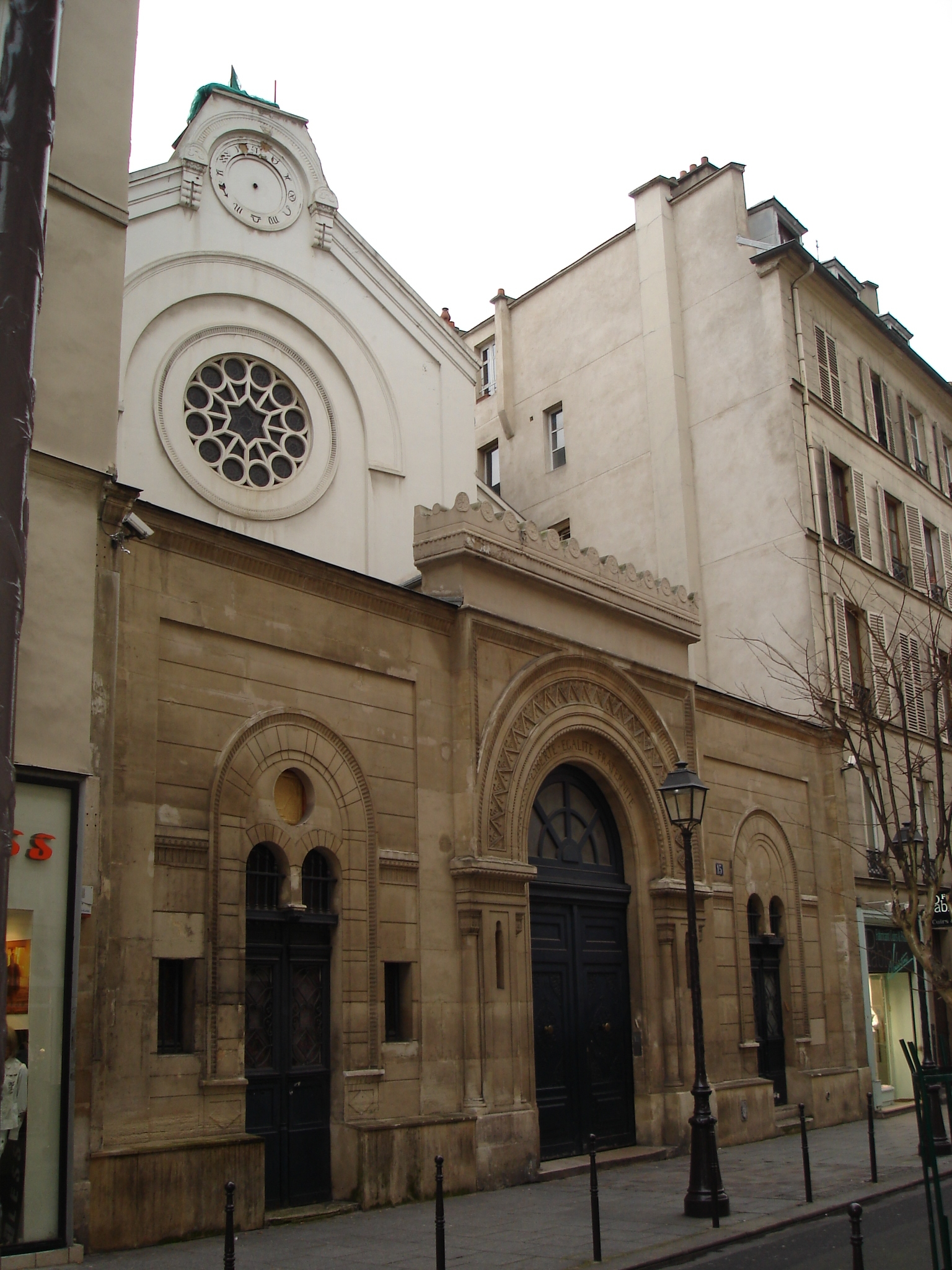
- The synagogue façade in 2008

- Location of the synagogue in Paris

Religion
- Affiliation: Orthodox Judaism
- Rite: Nusach Ashkenaz (1819–1941) Nusach Edot ha-Mizrach (post WWII)
- Ecclesiastical or organisational status: Synagogue
- Status: Active

Location
- Location: Rue Notre-Dame-de-Nazareth, IIIe arrondissement, Paris
- Country: France
- Coordinates: 48°52′01″N 2°21′36″E

Architecture
- Architect: Thierry (1810–1890)
- Type: Synagogue architecture
- Style: Moorish Revival
- Funded by: Baron James de Rothschild
- Established: 1819 (as a congregation)
- Groundbreaking: 1850
- Completed: 1852

Monument historique
- Official name: Synagogue
- Type: Base Mérimée
- Designated: June 24, 1993
- Reference no.: PA00086234

The Synagogue de Nazareth (French pronunciation: [sinaɡɔɡ də nazaʁɛt], "Nazareth Synagogue"), officially Synagogue de la rue Nazareth, is an Orthodox Jewish congregation and synagogue, located on the Rue Notre-Dame-de-Nazareth, in the IIIe arrondissement of Paris, France. The synagogue is the oldest of the 'great' synagogues of Paris.

== History ==
In 1810, the Ashkenazi Jews of Paris had two synagogues, one on rue Sainte-Avoye (today: rue du Temple) and another on rue du Chaulme (today: rue des Archives). Expelled from the synagogue on Saint-Avoye by the landlord in 1818, the community bought a plot of land in 1819 situated between 14 rue Neuve-Saint-Laurent (today: rue du Vertbois) and 15 rue Notre-Dame-de-Nazareth. After having received permission from King Louis XVIII, through the ordinance of 29 June 1819, the Assembly of the Jews of Paris, construction began under the direction of architect Sandrié de Jouy, and ended in 1822. The synagogue was built to accommodate a congregation of several hundred worshipers, including galleries for women. The synagogue on rue du Chaume was closed the following year.

Very rapidly faults began to emerge in construction, and in 1848, the building was in danger of collapsing. The police closed it in 1850 and it was destroyed. A new synagogue designed by the architect Thierry (1810–1890) was built on the site funded by donations from Baron James de Rothschild and was inaugurated in 1852.

The synagogue contains an organ, quite common among French Jews since Chief Rabbi Salomon Ulmann published a responsa in its favour. The actress Rachel was a member of the congregation. The composer Jacques Offenbach, after having arrived in Paris, was appointed, with his brother, to train and manage the choir "de la formation et de la direction du chœur" for six months from December 1833. It followed an Alsacien rite, and was the residence of the Chief Rabbis of France and of Paris until the construction of the Grand Synagogue (on rue de la Victoire) in 1875.

The French composer Ernest Cahen played the Cavaillé-Coll organ of the synagogue.

During the Second World War, in 1941 the synagogue was damaged by French collaborators. The chief rabbi of the synagogue, Joseph Saks, and his wife were arrested and deported during the Holocaust. Due to the influx of North African Jews from migration, the synagogue changed to follow the Sephardi rite.

The building was registered as a monument historique by the French authorities on June 24, 1993.

== Gallery ==
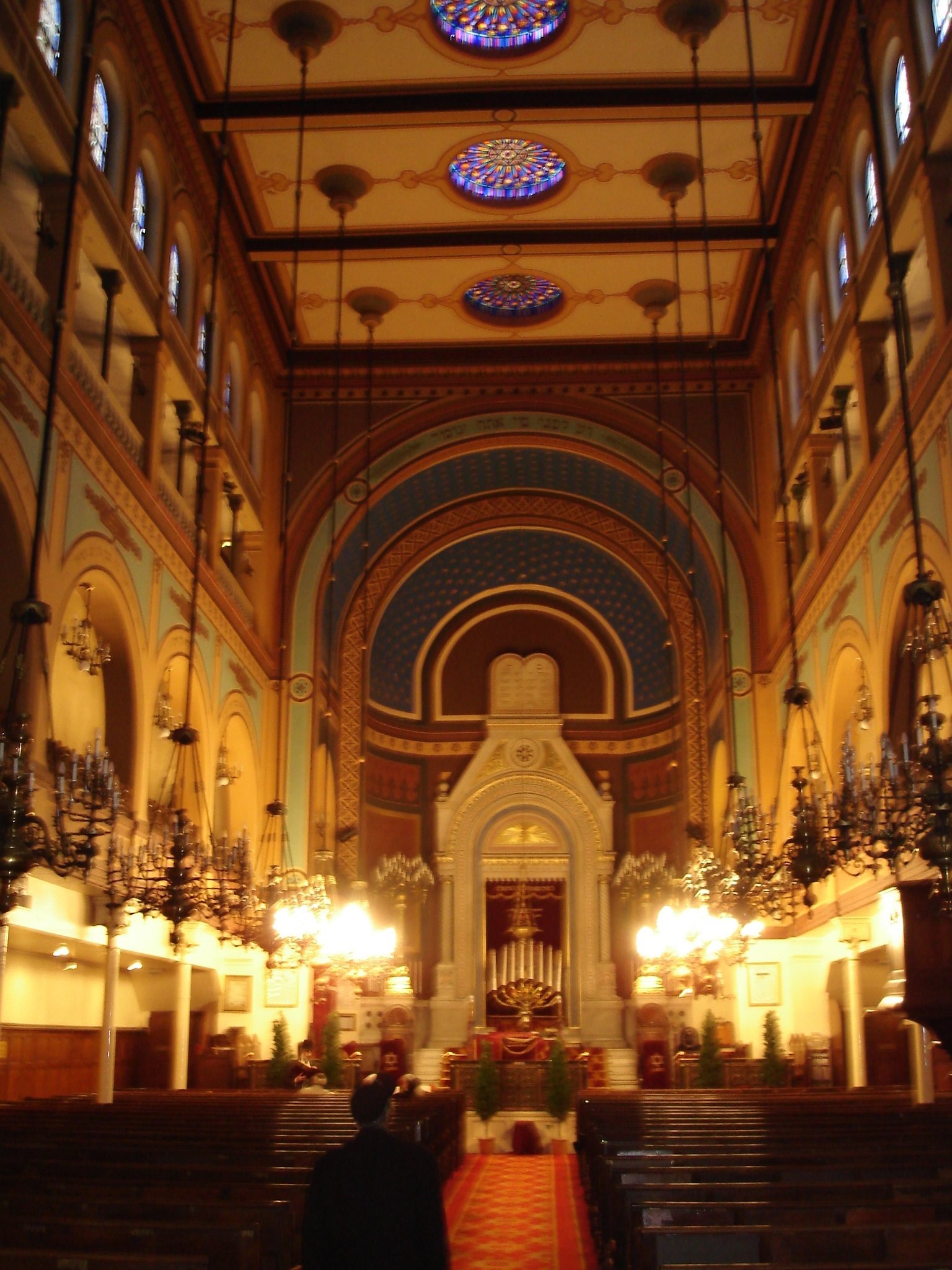
View of the interior of the synagogue

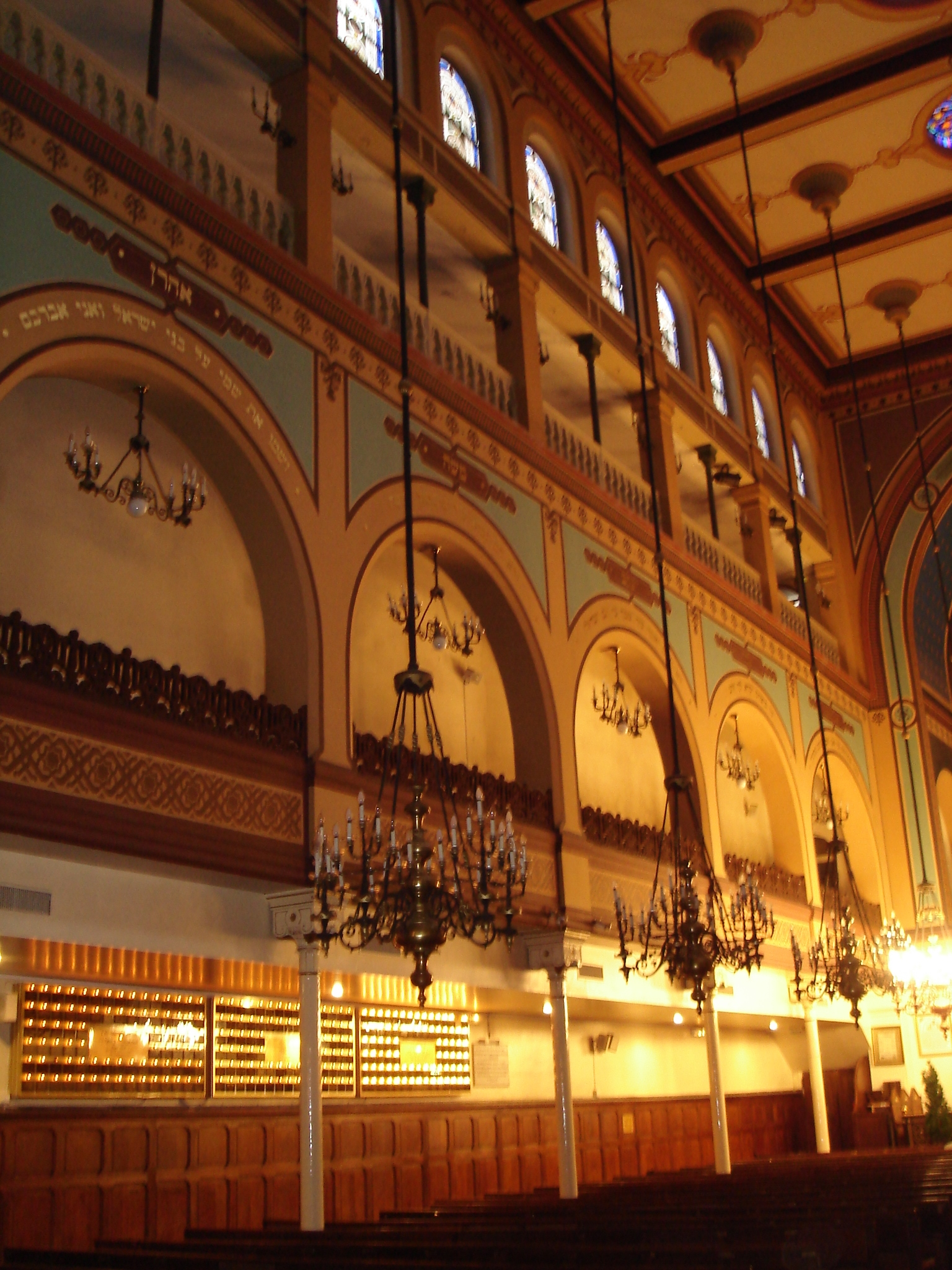
View of the gallery

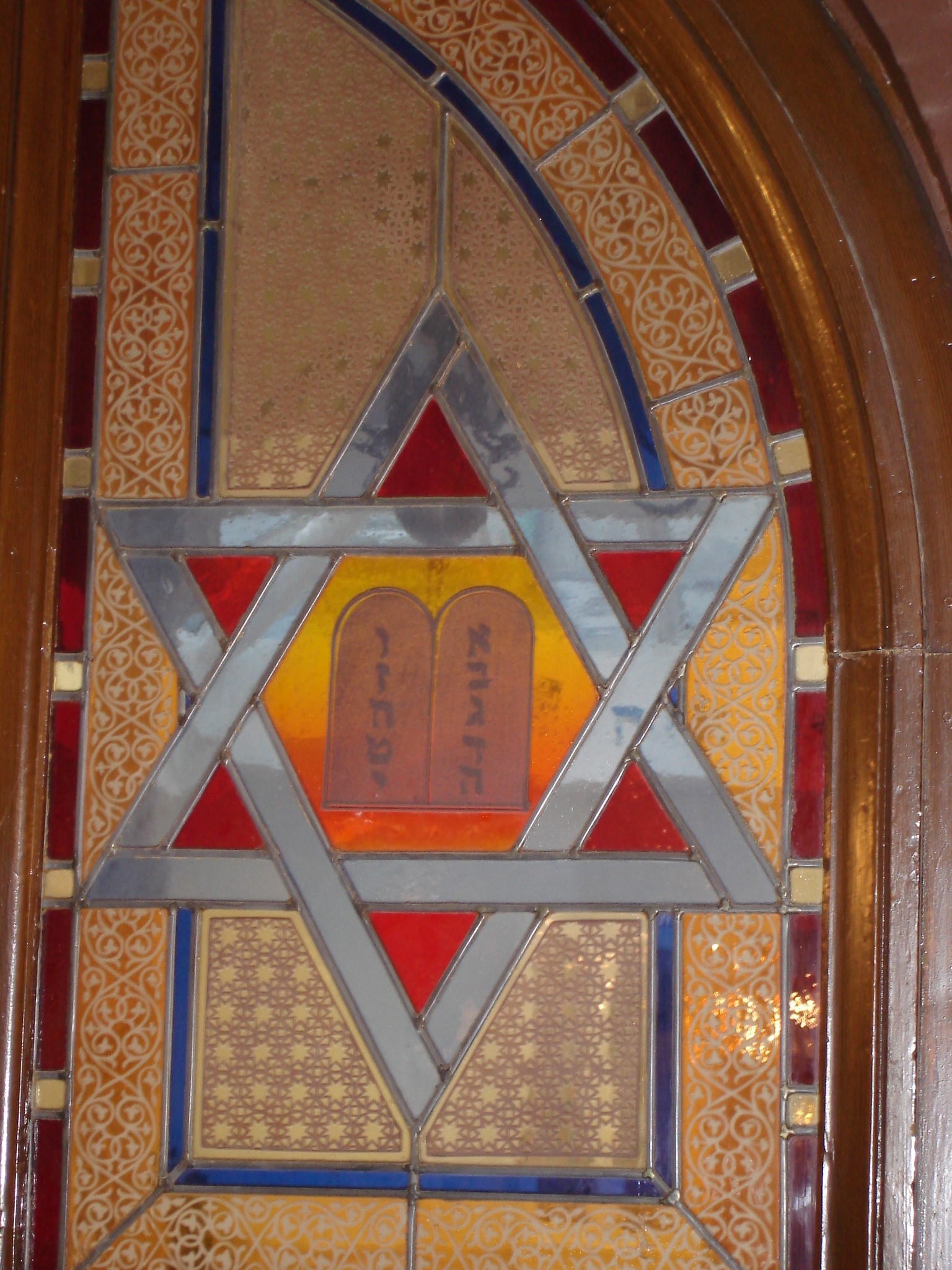
Star of David inside the synagogue

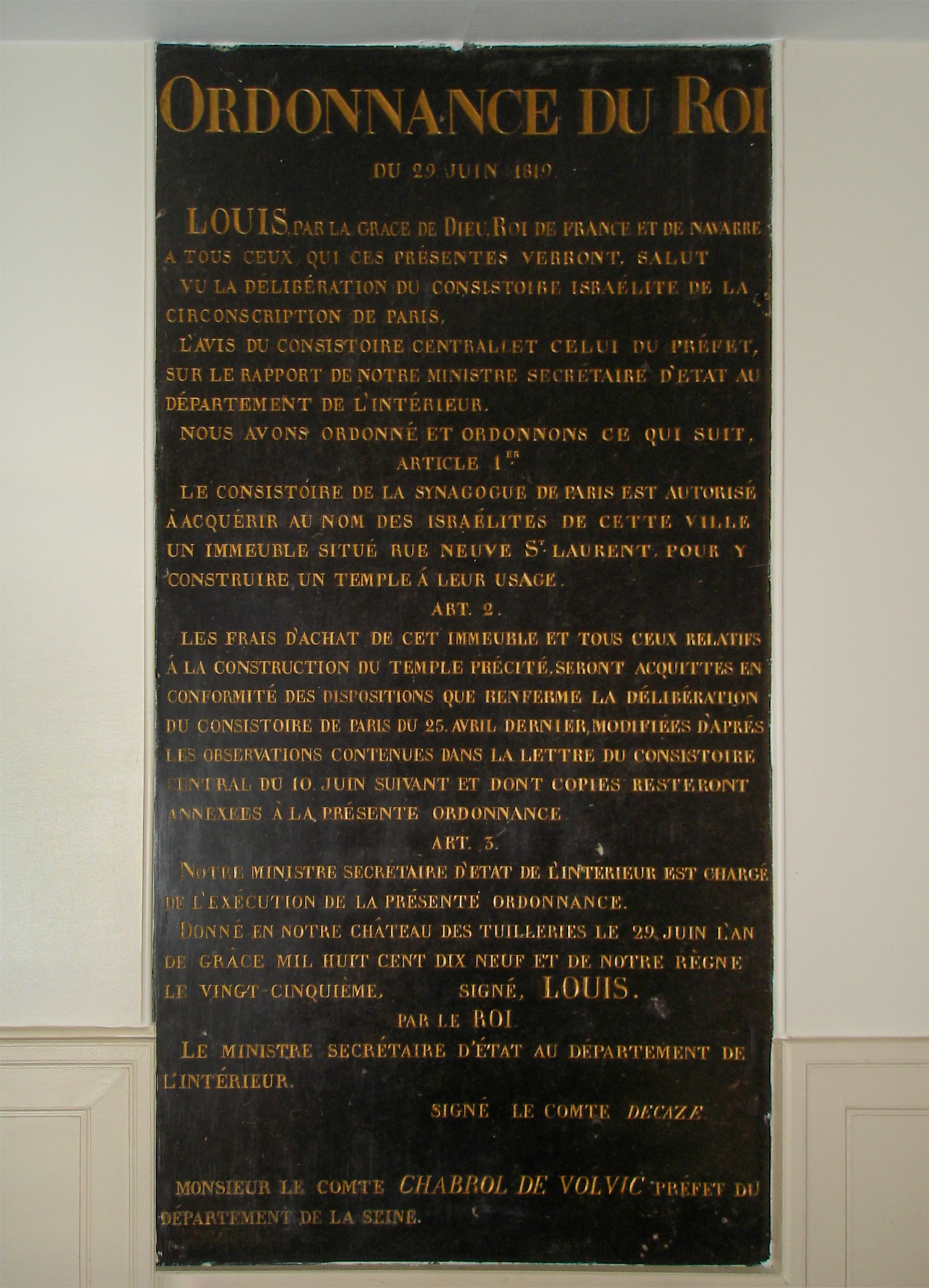
Plaque in thanks to the King

== See also ==
- History of the Jews in France
- List of synagogues in France
