= Fredrik Heffermehl =

Norwegian peace activist (1938–2023)

Honorary President of the Norwegian Peace Council
- Incumbent
- Assumed office 2004

President of the Norwegian Peace Council
- In office 1988–2004

Vice President of the International Peace Bureau
- In office 1994–?

Vice President of the International Association of Lawyers against Nuclear Arms
- In office 1997–?

Secretary-General of the Norwegian Humanist Association
- In office 1980–1982
- Succeeded by: Levi Fragell

Personal details
- Born: 11 November 1938 Rena, Norway
- Died: 21 December 2023 (aged 85)
- Occupation: Lawyer, civil servant and peace activist

Fredrik Stang Heffermehl (11 November 1938 – 21 December 2023) was a Norwegian jurist, writer and peace activist. He worked as a lawyer and civil servant from 1965 to 1982 and was the first secretary-general of the Norwegian Humanist Association from 1980 to 1982. He later made his mark as a writer and activist for peace and against nuclear arms. He was the honorary president, and president, of the Norwegian Peace Council, a vice president of the International Peace Bureau, and a vice president of the International Association of Lawyers against Nuclear Arms.

== Career ==
Born in Rena, Heffermehl enrolled at the University of Oslo, graduating with the cand.jur. degree in 1964. He then worked as a lawyer from 1965 to 1973, while also taking a master's degree in 1970 at New York University. In 1973 Heffermehl became an assistant director at the office of the Norwegian Consumer Ombudsman. He left this position in 1980 to become the first secretary-general of the Norwegian Humanist Association. He left the Humanist Association in 1982 to work as an independent writer. In addition to writing non-fiction books, Heffermehl has translated several books to Norwegian.

In 1988 he became the president of the NGO Norwegian Peace Council, and a member of the board of the International Peace Bureau. In 1994 he became vice president in the International Peace Bureau, and in 1997 he assumed the same position in the International Association of Lawyers Against Nuclear Arms. After stepping down as president of the Norwegian Peace Council, he was proclaimed honorary president.

=== Support of Mordechai Vanunu ===
Heffermehl was an outspoken supporter of Mordechai Vanunu, the technician who revealed the Israeli nuclear programme. Heffermehl said in 2008 that he had nominated Vanunu for the Nobel Peace Prize eighteen times. He also tried to pressure the Norwegian government to grant political asylum to Vanunu on numerous occasions, citing that Norway had a special responsibility due to their 1959 delivery of heavy water to Israel via Great Britain. In April 2008 it was revealed that the Norwegian Directorate of Immigration had granted asylum to Vanunu in 2004, but the decision was overturned by then-Minister Erna Solberg. Upon the revelation Heffermehl expressed concern that although the political leadership of Norway changed in 2005, not nearly enough was done in the way of helping Vanunu, due to perceived loyalty concerns to the United States. Minister of Foreign Affairs Jonas Gahr Støre, on the other hand, stated that Norway already had put enough pressure on Israel, through diplomatic channels. In May 2008 Heffermehl, this time together with prominent jurists such as Ketil Lund and Jan Fridthjof Bernt, again petitioned the Norwegian Prime Minister to take action.

== Nobel Peace Prize criticism ==
From August 2007 Heffermehl marked himself as a staunch critic of the Norwegian Nobel Committee, which, according to Heffermehl, has failed to comply with the will of Alfred Nobel, thereby making several awards—45% of the awards after 1945—juridically illegal. Among the laureates perceived by Heffermehl as illegal are the more controversial laureates, such as Henry Kissinger and Le Duc Tho (1973) and Arafat, Peres and Rabin (1994), but also less controversial ones such as Mother Teresa (1979) and Elie Wiesel (1986). Although many laureates have done "commendable work", Heffermehl stressed that this is not good enough to receive a prize whose criteria explicitly pertain to disarmament and peace work.

His views were first explained in depth in the 2008 book Nobels vilje (English: "Nobel's Will"). Since 1948, the selection of members of the Nobel Committee has been delegated from the Parliament of Norway (against what Nobel prescribed) to the major political parties. According to Heffermehl, the Norwegian political parties have used committee membership as an award to over-the-hill politicians in recognition of their service, rather than picking non-partisan people with an actual background in peace activism. Furthermore, Heffermehl, being an opponent of the Norwegian membership in NATO, found that the broad pro-NATO consensus among Norwegian political parties has skewed the Nobel Peace Prize in a similar direction. This, says Heffermehl, runs contrary to Alfred Nobel's wishes to abandon military institutions.

In an interview with Ny Tid he suggested that the current Committee members be replaced with people such as Jan Egeland, Ingrid Fiskaa, Jostein Gaarder and Sverre Lodgaard. Other suggestions from Heffermehl include Gunnar Garbo, Ingrid Eide, Erik Dammann, Torild Skard, Reiulf Steen, Johan Galtung and Berit Ås. In Nobels vilje, Heffermehl regretted that Eide had not been hired as Nobel Committee secretary when she actually applied for that position in 1990.

In November 2023, the book The Real Nobel Peace Prize. A Squandered Opportunity to Abolish War was published. It is based on in-depth studies of the locked-down archives of the Norwegian Nobel Institute.

=== Criticism of Norwegian parliament distorting Nobel's intention ===
In the autumn of 2010 Heffermehl published a critical study, The Nobel Peace Prize. What Nobel really wanted. The aim was to look into the methods used by the Norwegian establishment to repress his rediscovery of the content of the prize for "the champions of peace" named in the 1895 will of Alfred Nobel. Nobel made a choice between two fundamentally different ways forward for humanity, either continuing to seek peace by military means or by co-operation on international law, institutions, and disarmament. When Parliament and the Nobel Committee ignored his views and declared that no one supported his interpretation, Heffermehl set out to prove them wrong. He found that numerous academic and other works over the years had expressed the same views on the role of Bertha von Suttner and that Nobel intended to support the antimilitarist peace movement. This made it necessary to use the fate of the Peace Prize for a case study of the distortion of Nobel's testament and how Parliament had managed the prize entrusted to them by Nobel. "The Nobel Peace Prize" in English has been updated and expanded for editions in Chinese (FLP, Jan. 2011), Swedish (Leopard, Oct. 2011), Finnish (LIKE, Dec. 2011), Russian (Aletheia, in 2012). On 10 December 2011, a leader of the Nobel Family Association for 15 years, Michael Nobel, supported the criticism voiced by Heffermehl, warning that Norwegian politicians may lose their independent control of the peace prize.

== Death ==
Heffermehl died late December 2023, at the age of 85.

== Legacy ==
Heffermehl established a fund and instructed that the money be used as prize money for "The Real Nobel Peace Prize". The prize was first awarded in a ceremony in Oslo on 10 November 2024.

== See also ==
- List of peace activists

Non-profit organization positions
Preceded by position created	Secretary-general of the Norwegian Humanist Association; 1980–1982	Succeeded by Levi Fragell
