= Copson =

Copson is a surname. Notable people with the surname include:

- Andrew Copson (born 1980), British humanist leader and writer
- Bill Copson (1908–1971), English cricketer
- Edward Copson (1901–1980), British mathematician
- Tom Copson (born 1984), English singer-songwriter
