= Humanist Outlook =

Quarterly magazine by the Indian Humanist Union

The Humanist Outlook is a quarterly magazine published by the Indian Humanist Union.

== History and profile ==
The first issue of Humanist Outlook was published in Autumn 1966. The founding editor was Narsingh Narain, who also founded the Indian Humanist Union in 1954 under the name The Society for the Promotion of Freedom of Thought. Then the magazine was edited by his son, Prakash Narain. The magazine is based in Delhi.
