= Jaap van Praag =

Dutch humanist (1911-1981)

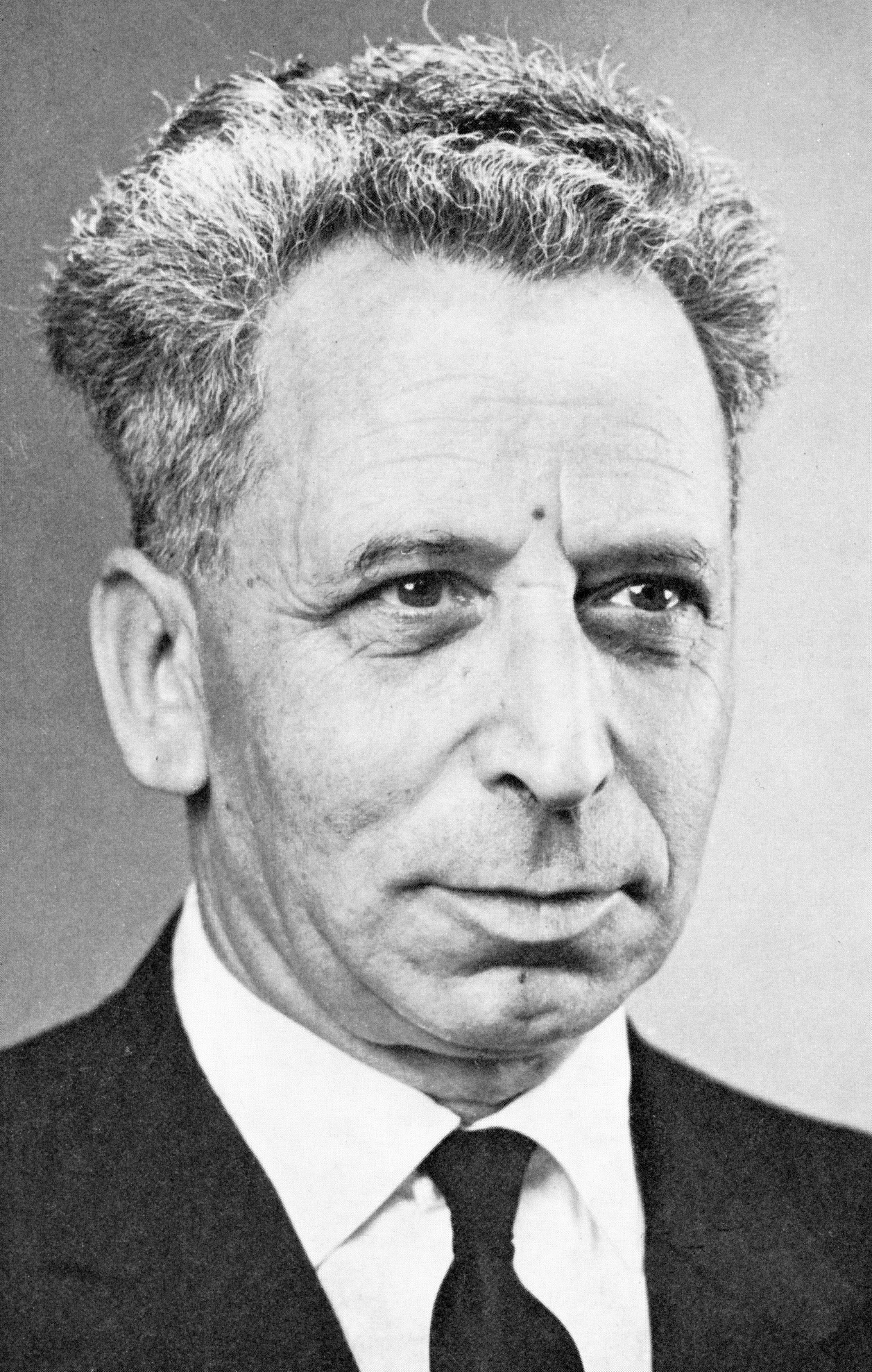
Jaap van Praag

Jacob Philip "Jaap" van Praag (Dutch pronunciation: [ˈjaːkɔp ˈfilɪp ˈjaːp fɑm ˈpraːx], born 11 May 1911 in Amsterdam, died April 1981 in Utrecht) was a Dutch humanist thinker, organiser and politician. He is widely regarded as the founder of organised secular humanism in the Netherlands and as one of the principal architects of the modern international humanist movement.

He was the founding chairman of the Dutch Humanist League (Humanistisch Verbond, 1946–1969) and the first chairman of the International Humanist and Ethical Union (IHEU, now Humanists International), serving from its inception in 1952 until 1975.

Before World War II, Van Praag was a socialist and pacifist activist. As a Jew, he went into hiding during the Nazi occupation of the Netherlands.

== Early life and education ==
Van Praag was born in Amsterdam into a secular Jewish socialist family. His father Manus van Praag was a gymnastics teacher and member of the Social Democratic Workers' Party (SDAP); his mother Sara Vleeschhouwer came from a Jewish middle-class background. Van Praag studied Dutch literature, philosophy and history at the University of Amsterdam, graduating cum laude in 1937, and worked as a secondary-school teacher. He began a doctoral dissertation on the poet Henriette Roland Holst, which he was unable to defend until 1946 due to the war.

In 1937 he married Martje Harmke Hoff. The couple had four children.

== Pre-war activism ==
During the 1930s Van Praag was active in socialist and pacifist circles. He joined the SDAP in 1929, briefly left for the Independent Socialist Party in protest at the SDAP's abandonment of unilateral disarmament, and later returned. From 1933 he was active in the Youth Peace Action (Jongeren Vredes Aktie, JVA), a radical-pacifist youth organisation in which he served as chairman (1937–1939). The JVA developed the concept of "spiritual resilience" (geestelijke weerbaarheid), a non-violent alternative to military defence that would become central to Van Praag's later humanist thinking. In the JVA he met many of the figures with whom he would later found the Dutch Humanist League.

== Second World War ==
In October 1941 Van Praag was barred from teaching at the municipal lyceum in Dordrecht under the Nazi anti-Jewish measures. He then taught briefly at a Jewish secondary school in Rotterdam. In September 1943 he was arrested for helping to hide a Jewish child and detained for about six weeks. From October 1943 until the liberation of the southern Netherlands in September 1944 he lived in hiding in Eindhoven, where he began drafting his first major work on humanism, Modern Humanisme: een renaissance? (1947). After the liberation of the south he served briefly as an editor of the Eindhoven edition of the resistance newspaper Het Parool.

Reflecting later on the experience of the war, Van Praag identified what he saw as a widespread moral indifference, or "nihilism", in pre-war European society as a key reason Western civilisation had failed to resist Nazism and fascism more effectively, and argued for a renewed moral awareness grounded in human values rather than religion.

== Humanist movement ==
=== Dutch Humanist League ===
In late 1945 Van Praag initiated the founding of the Dutch Humanist League together with Garmt Stuiveling, Jan Brandt Corstius and others. At the founding meeting on 17 February 1946 the historian H. R. Hoetink was chosen as the first chairman because the new organisation wished to have a professor at its head, but Van Praag succeeded him after eight months and remained chairman until 1969. In his opening address he set out two strands of humanist activity that would shape the League's programme: the "Great Fight", providing a positive moral and existential framework for the growing number of non-religious people, and the "Small Fight", securing equal civic standing for humanists alongside the established religious denominations within the Netherlands' pillarised (verzuilde) society.

Under his leadership the League grew rapidly and used the Dutch tradition of equal treatment of worldviews to obtain state recognition for humanist chaplaincy in the armed forces, prisons and healthcare, and to establish a network of humanist welfare organisations. On 27 April 1965, the Dutch prime minister Jo Cals, in a policy declaration (regeringsverklaring) stated that "policy would be carried by the spiritual values expressed in Christianity and humanism". In 1966, Van Praag marked this event as the formal end of the humanist emancipation struggle in the Netherlands.

=== International Humanist and Ethical Union ===
Van Praag was the principal organiser of the founding congress of the International Humanist and Ethical Union, held in Amsterdam on 22–27 August 1952, at which he chaired the organising committee and was elected its first chairman. The congress, opened by Julian Huxley, brought together representatives of the American Ethical Union, the American Humanist Association, the British Ethical Union, the Vienna Ethical Society and the Dutch Humanist League, and adopted the original Amsterdam Declaration (1952 version) setting out the fundamentals of "modern, ethical Humanism".

Van Praag remained chairman of the IHEU until 1975, working to consolidate the organisation, expand its membership beyond its initial Western-Atlantic base. He was made an honorary board member after stepping down and received a special award from the IHEU at its 1978 London Congress. The organisation was renamed Humanists International in 2019.

== Death ==
Van Praag died in Utrecht on 12 April 1981, aged 69.

== Name confusion ==
Van Praag is sometimes confused with his namesake Jaap van Praag (football administrator), former chairman of football club Ajax Amsterdam. Both were around the same age (born 1911 and 1910), born in Amsterdam and both survived the war hiding in the city. In addition both played a role in broadcasting for the Dutch broadcaster VARA.
