= Shyam Kumari Khan =

Indian lawyer and politician (1904–1980)

Shyam Kumari Nehru
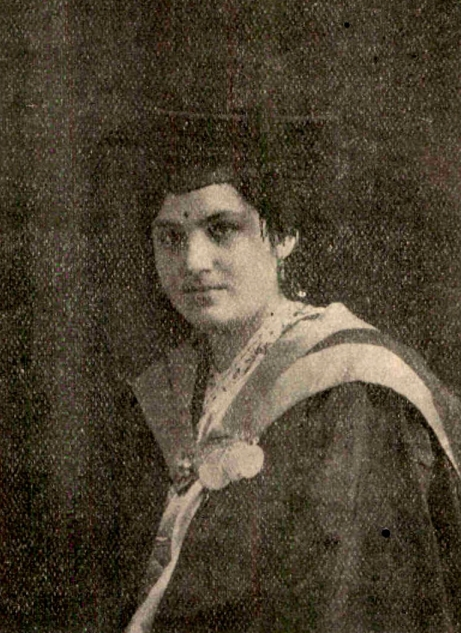
- Born: Shyam Kumari Nehru; 20 October 1904
- Died: 9 June 1980 (aged 75)
- Occupations: Lawyer; Indian independence activist Rajya Sabha member Social worker
- Political party: Indian National Congress
- Spouse: Abdul Jamil Khan
- Children: 2
- Relatives: Jawaharlal Nehru (first cousin once removed); Uma Nehru (mother); Arun Nehru (nephew)

Shyam Kumari Khan née Nehru (20 October 1904 – 9 June 1980) was an Indian lawyer, freedom fighter, politician and social worker. She was a member of the Rajya Sabha from 1963 to 1968.

== Career ==
Khan studied at Allahabad University and was the first woman to become secretary, vice-president and president of the Allahabad University Union in the years 1924–1928. A lawyer by profession, she defended Yashpal, a writer, freedom fighter and political prisoner, during his trial in 1932 when he was imprisoned for his attempts to overthrow the British Empire.

In 1932, she joined the Khilafat Movement and the Civil Disobedience Movement and led women freedom fighters along with Kamala Nehru. She was also one of the prominent women leaders during the Salt March along with her mother Uma Nehru.

After Independence, she remained active as a social worker. On 30 May 1952, she became one of the founding members of the Indian Council for Child Welfare (ICCW) along with other notable personalities such as Indira Gandhi, Rajkumari Amrit Kaur and B. Shiva Rao. She later became the General Secretary of ICCW.

Under the chairmanship of Radha Raman and Shyam Kumari Khan, the ICCW organized an International Children's Fair in Delhi which was inaugurated by the then Prime Minister Indira Gandhi on 17 October 1969. She was also a founding member of the Indian Humanist Union, of which she became an elected chairman after the death of Narsingh Narain in 1972.

She was a member of the Rajya Sabha from 11 December 1963 to 2 April 1968.

== Personal life ==
Born on 20 October 1904, she was the eldest child of Shamlal Nehru and Uma Nehru. Her father Shamlal was the first cousin of India's first Prime Minister Jawaharlal Nehru. She married Abdul Jamil Khan on 7 December 1937 under the Special Marriages Act, 1872, and later came to be known as 'Shyam Kumari Khan'.

Shyama Kumari Nehru married in her late 30s, and was considered to be past "marriageable age". When she married Abdul Jamil Khan they faced censure from her family. However, she was financially independent as she was a practicing lawyer and they were able to resist the pressure and marry. Her family later came around. They had two children, Kabir Kumar Khan and Kamala Kumari Khan.

She died on 9 June 1980, aged 75.
