= Maggie Ardiente =

American humanist leader

Maggie Ardiente is an American humanist leader, activist, and nonprofit executive who serves as President of Humanists International. Elected in 2025, she is the first person of color to hold the role.

Regarded as a prominent voice for humanism in the United States and internationally, Ardiente advocates on issues including civil rights, reproductive freedom, and the separation of church and state. As an activist for the American Humanist Association, Ardiente served as a lead organizer of the 2012 Reason Rally in Washington, DC, one of the largest ever gatherings of atheists, humanists, and non-believers in US history, before later taking on a national fundraising role for the PFLAG LGBTQ+ rights organization, and later as President for the Secular Coalition for America, which lobbies Congress on behalf of non-religious Americans.

== Career ==
Ardiente began her career in humanist advocacy at the American Humanist Association (AHA), where she worked for twelve years, eventually becoming the Director of Development and Communications and a senior editor of TheHumanist.com. In this capacity, Ardiente was one of the main organizers of the Reason Rally in 2012 at the National Mall in Washington, DC, "a celebration of fact-driven public policy, the value of critical thinking, and the voting power of secular Americans" which was attended by 20,000 to 30,000 people. The rally was praised for achieving a diverse turnout in comparison to prior high-profile atheist events in the United States, with attendees being "largely under the age of 30, at least half female and included many people of color".

Following her time at the AHA, Ardiente served as Vice President of Development at PFLAG National, the American LGBTQ+ advocacy organization. She was later appointed President of the Secular Coalition for America, an umbrella organization that represents twenty national secular, humanist, and atheist groups in the United States. In July 2025, Ardiente was elected President of Humanists International, succeeding British humanist leader Andrew Copson. She is the first woman of color to hold the position. She had previously been elected to the Humanists International Board of Directors in 2023.

Ardiente has been a vocal advocate for reproductive rights, particularly in response to the political climate in the United States. In academic coverage of her work, Anthony B. Pinn describes Ardiente's approach to humanism as "a tool of policy development... advancing a humanist agenda as a means by which to transform societies." Godless Americana: Race and Religious Rebels writer Sikivu Hutchinson describes Ardiente as motivated by a belief in humanists' fundamental responsibility to challenge social inequality: contending that "just as faith-based organizations are designed to meet their communities’ social welfare, education, and political needs, so humanist organizations should be."

Ardiente is frequently sought out as an authority or commentator on topics relating to separation of church and state, LGBTQ+ rights, reproductive rights, and humanist issues. She has spoken at numerous conferences and universities and appeared in national media as a commentator on NPR, Fox News, and in writing in the Washington Post.

== Personal life ==
Ardiente was raised Catholic and is of Filipino American heritage. She began questioning her faith in high school and identified as an atheist in college after joining a student freethinkers group. She later found humanism, which she felt encompassed her values.

She is a graduate of James Madison University and received an executive certificate in nonprofit management from Georgetown University. She is married to Roy Speckhardt, former executive director of the American Humanist Association.
