= Humanist Association of Ghana =

Organization

- Abbreviation: HAG
- Formation: 2015; 11 years ago
- Type: Nonprofit
- Registration no.: CG149202015
- Purpose: protection of human rights, promoting of critical thinking
- Region served: West Africa
- Members: cca 40 (2017)
- President: Michael Osei Assibey
- Organising Secretary: Angela Adatsi
- Communication Director: Justice Okai-Allotey
- Main organ: Board of Executives
- Parent organization: Humanists International
- Website: ghanahumanists.org
- Formerly called: Freethought Ghana

The Humanist Association of Ghana (HAG) is a humanist organization of atheists and agnostics living in Ghana who espouse humanism as a way of life, fight for the protection of human rights and promote critical thinking.

== History ==
In 2007, Leo Igwe spoke at a seminar on humanism at the University of Cape Coast to explore the possibilities of collaboration between the Formerly International Humanist and Ethical Union (IHEU) and activists and universities in Ghana.

In the 80s Ghanaian humanist, Hope Tawiah, started the Rational Center …when there were few people who appreciated rational thinking and action. I hope more Ghanaian humanists will come forward and ensure that the Rational Center of Humanism in Ghana holds.

— Leo Igwe

Five years later, in 2012, a network of freethinkers was formed through social media. At that time, when asked "Are you a believer?" 96% of Ghanaians answered "Yes"; atheism is still taboo in the local culture.

The first meeting of HAG members was held in Ghana's capital Accra, and the group is based there. After the meeting, the group adopted the name "Freethought Ghana" as a social support group of freethinkers, atheists, and agnostics, starting with 11 members and growing exponentially to include freethinkers from all over the world. Out of this group, the Humanist Association of Ghana was born.

The organization was registered as the Humanist Association of Ghana in 2015, under reg. no. CG149202015.

HAG is a member of the IHEU and the International Humanist and Ethical Youth Organization. HAG subscribes to the Amsterdam Declaration of 2002.

Roslyn Mould, former President of HAG (since November 2015), Chair of the International Humanist and Ethical Youth Organization (IHEYO) African Working Group (since July 2016), became the first African woman to be elected to the Board of Humanist International.

HAG has become a hub for organised humanism in West Africa.

As of 2017, HAG has around 40 official members of both Christian and Muslim origin.

== Objectives of the organization ==
The organization seeks to follow in the footsteps of the Rational Center whose founder, Hope Tawiah, died on September 27, 2009. Their stated objectives are:

- To promote an ethical life based on reason and human values.
- To support human rights in the belief that all people are worthy of respect as long as they are not infringing on the rights or well-being of others.
- To promote science and critical thinking as the primary ways to understand the world.
- To transcend divisive loyalties based on race, religion, gender, politics, nationality, class and ethnicity.
- To support an open, pluralistic and diverse society.
- To support secular state that guarantees freedom of religion for all.
- To provide a support network for those who have no religious beliefs or wish to question their own received assumptions
- To work with all individuals and organisations with whom we share common concerns.
- To promote the separation of religion and state

== Activism ==
=== Conferences ===
In November 2012, the HAG organized a successful conference, bringing together humanists from around the world to discuss issues important to the development of humanism in Ghana. The conference was sponsored by the International Humanist and Ethical Youth Organization (IHEYO).

The organization held its 2nd West African Humanist Conference (WAHC) under the leadership of Roslyn Mold in December 2014 in Aburi, entitled "African Youth for Science and Reason". It discussed topics important to humanism, such as feminism, accusations of witchcraft in West Africa, and humanistic rites. Leo Igwe attended the conference and was deeply impressed. Some members at the meeting traveled hundreds of kilometers, one from a distance of more than 600 km.

=== Public proclamation of atheism ===
In December 2017, HAG President Michael Assibey, in an interview with Accra-based Starr FM, openly stated that "it is not true that there is God but one can believe there is. If God pops his head out and says 'hello', I'll believe He exists ... religion can make you more selfish than logic. Religion divides us along the lines. It's only in religious settings that people sin for 6 days and ask for forgiveness in a day. As a nation ... we over-rely on the 'Fa ma Nyame' (Give it to God) syndrome."

=== Appeals to the Ghanaian government ===
The HAG, together with the IHEU, called on Ghana to protect the human rights of all its people in a statement issued in February 2018 as part of the UNHRC Universal Periodic Review at the 37th session, stating that "harmful practices involving women and girls, such as genital mutilation, witchcraft, forced marriage, domestic violence and rape, are widespread. Women's rights to inheritance, property ownership and active participation in public life are precarious. Children suffer from poverty, and harmful practices such as child labour, sexual exploitation, early and forced marriage, violence and corporal punishment."

As a country that has as its motto "freedom and justice," we have to do better and we can do better. If we can do better, we must do better.

— Agomo Atambire, former secretary of HAG

In May 2020, the HAG sent an open letter to the Ghanaian parliament calling for the use of skepticism in its decision-making and pointing out errors in social and economic issues.

In response to a request from Foh-Amoaning, the executive director of the National Coalition for Proper Human Sexual Rights and Family Values, in February 2021 to criminalise the promotion of LGBT+ rights and freedoms for Ghanaians, Ms. Angela Adatsi, Organising Secretary of The Humanist Association of Ghana, said for Accra-based Class FM that:

few days after I read the bill, I was in shock and I needed a few days to actually sit down and gather my thought about the whole bill because it is embarrassing ... I was in shock because not only does this bill criminalise advocacy or all members of the LGBT (community) but even against heterosexuals as well. You can't even use sex toys when you're having sex ... this is a serious embarrassment for our country and for our democracy as well.

In an interview with Starr FM, Kwabena Antwi Boasiako said in June 2021 that he does not understand that "for the Speaker of Parliament to think of this as a worthy problem to solve or a worthy cause to take especially against your own citizens. This level of homophobia is just unbelievable coming from somebody who has sworn to serve all the people in Ghana."

=== Podcast ===
HAG published its own podcast, the Hagtivist Podcast, which features interviews with humanists and allies in Ghana. It has been inactive since February 2020.

== See also ==
- Religion in Ghana
- Christianity in Ghana
- Islam in Ghana
- Demographics of Ghana
