= Rutgers WPF Indonesia =

Indonesian branch of Rutgers WPF

Rutgers WPF Indonesia is the Indonesian branch of Rutgers WPF, an international center of expertise on Sexual and Reproductive Health and Rights (SRHR) founded and based in the Netherlands. The Indonesian branch was established in 2007, founded under the name "WPF".

Rutgers WPF is the result of the merger between the World Population Foundation (WPF) and Rutgers Nisso Groep, a Dutch Expert Centre on Sexuality in 2010. The organization focuses on improving sexual and reproductive health and the acceptance of sexual rights and gender equality in developing countries across Europe, Africa and Asia.

Since 2009, the organization has been headed internationally by executive director Dianda Veldman and by Monique Soesman in Jakarta, Indonesia since 2014.

== History ==
WPF Indonesia started its work with a project in Sumatra in Indonesia in 1997. From 1998 to 2004, it expanded to other areas. In 2005, the first office was opened and in 2007 there was a memorandum of understanding between the government and WPF. By the end of 2010, Melanie Schultz van Haegen, Chairperson Supervisory Board of WPF, announced in the annual report of 2009, that a fusion will take place: WPF merged with Rutgers Nisso Groep, a Dutch Centre on Sexuality. WPF was an international organization, that had had experience in developing countries and a reputation in the field of international advocacy. Rutgers WPF was founded to work at improving sexual health in the Netherlands and in developing countries.

== Objective ==
Rutgers WPF Indonesia is an institution that focuses on sexual and gender-based violence (SGBV) and the implementation of Sexual and Reproductive Health and Rights (SRHR). It acts as an international non-profit organization that serves as an intermediary between the government and operators in Indonesia. Rutgers WPF Indonesia is consulted by government agencies, as well as development partners (United Nations agencies).

Rutgers WPF Indonesia provides assistance in program development and offers trainings and makes and supports public campaigns on SRHR and SGBV. Organizations that partner with Rutgers WPF Indonesia focus also on improving education on sexual and reproductive health and rights and access to sexual and reproductive health services with primary targets being women, youth, and marginalized groups, as stated in the Semi-Annual Report of 2014. Rutgers WPF Indonesia supports the implementation of programs and advocacy efforts to ensure policies that support the SRHR agreed in international treaties. This international agreement, amongst others, was written down in Cairo in 1994 and in the Millennium Development Goals.

The main aim of the institution is to shape responsible and healthy sexual behaviors, preventing unplanned pregnancies and sexually transmitted infections, including HIV and AIDS. Discussing sexual and reproductive health issues, such as family planning and the right to self-determination, in a country where these are viewed as sensitive topics can be counted to Rutgers WPF Indonesia's main objective.

=== Principles ===
Rutgers WPF Indonesia states the following principles:

1. The recognition of and respect for human rights
2. Supporting efforts to establish the values of non-violence.
3. A positive and open attitude towards sexuality and diversity
4. All activities are based on the sensitivity of the cultural context, gender, race/ethnicity, age, religion, and the active involvement of the target group.

=== Target groups ===
The main people Rutgers WPF aims offers its services to are women victims of violence, male perpetrators of violence, adolescents, children, special needs groups (including the disabled, street children and children in conflict with the law), LGBT and PLWHA.

== Finances ==
The financial aspect, the mobilization of resources to realize its aims, was also written down as one of Rutgers WPF Indonesia's main missions. Rutgers WPF receives annual funding from the Dutch Ministry of Health, Welfare.

== Programs ==
At the moment (February 2019) Rutgers WPF Indonesia has 4 programs running. Programs change regularly and are supported by Rutgers WPF for a certain time.

Program	Specification	Run time
dance4life	Volunteer Build youth awareness of health and rights through popular culture	2010–present
Get up speak out	Seeking to fill the lack of information and services on sexuality and reproductive health for adolescents.	?–present
Prevention+	Reducing violence against women and increasing women's economic participation by approaching the involvement of men as agents of change.	?–present
Yes I do	Preventing child marriage, teen pregnancy and harmful practices for women's reproductive organs.	2016–present

== References and external links ==
- Rutgers WPF Indonesia
- MenCare+ Indonesia
- Rutgers WPF International
- MenCare+ International
- A Little Piece of Heaven in Bondowoso
