= Roslyn Mould =

Ghanaian humanist

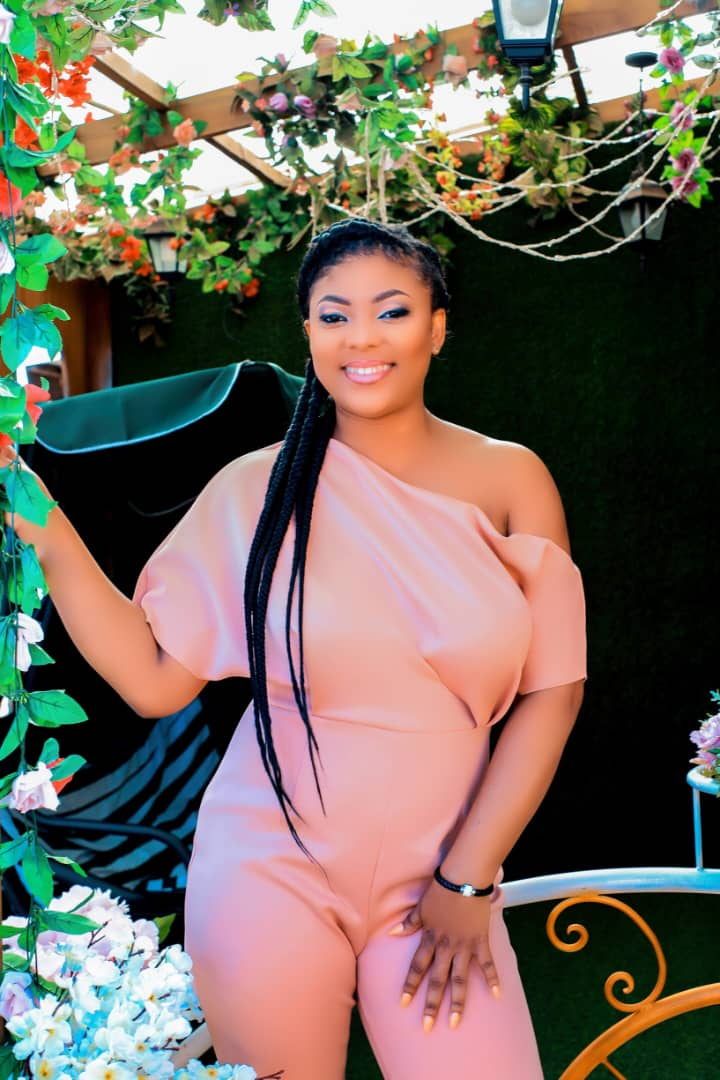
- Education: University of Ghana
- Movement: Humanists International

Roslyn Mould is the first African woman to be elected as a board member of Humanists International. Previously, she was the President of the Humanist Association of Ghana.

== Activism ==
She began her work in activism when she joined the Humanist Association of Ghana in 2012. Between 2015 and 2019, she became Organizing Secretary, and later, President and Council Member of Humanist Association of Ghana.

In 2019, she was appointed as the Coordinator of the West African Humanists Network.

In 2021, she spoke against the Ghanaian anti-LGBT bill and attended a protest at Ghana's High Commission in the UK against the bill.
