= Christian Lomsdalen =

President of Norwegian Humanist Association

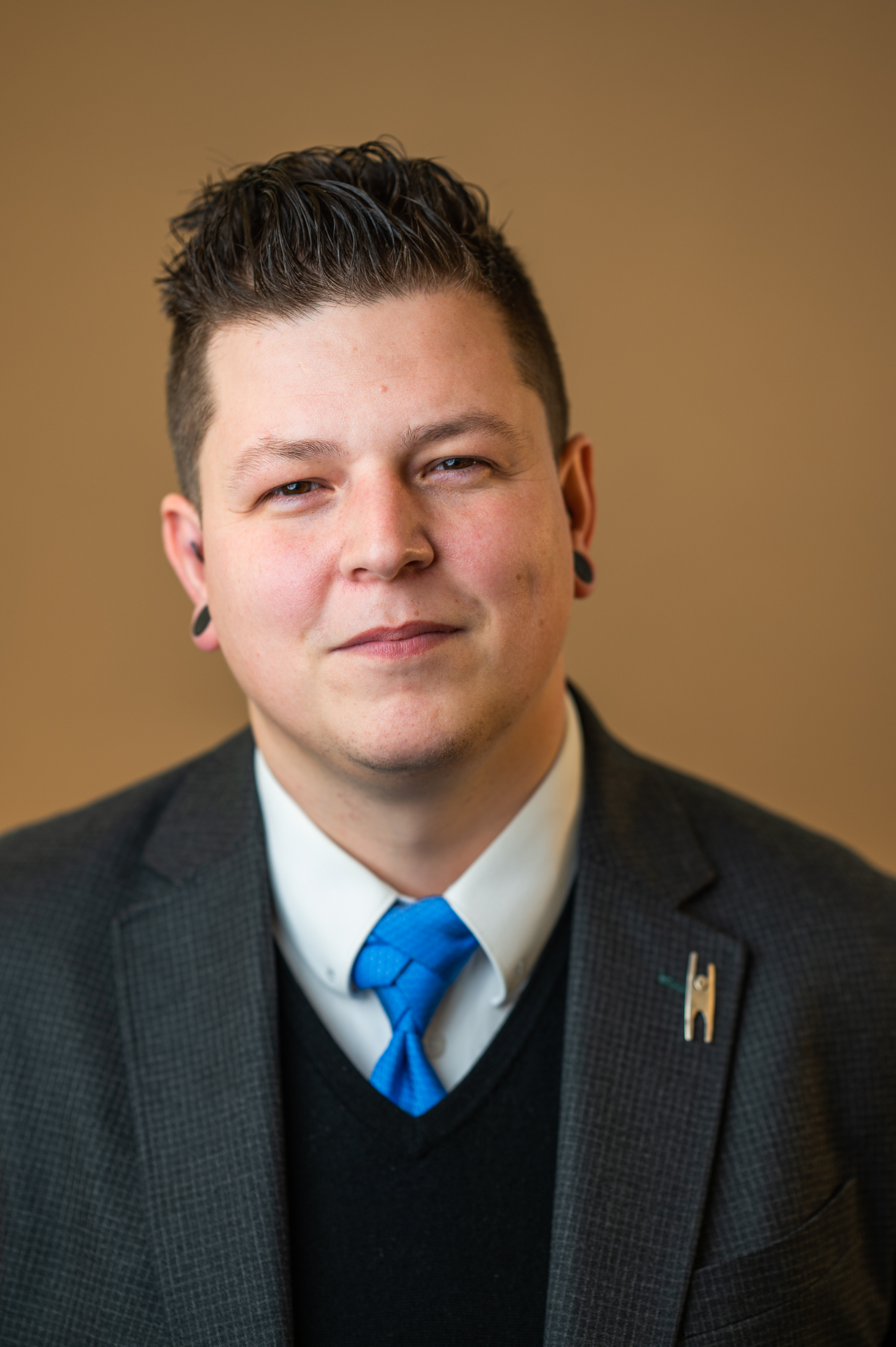
Christian Lomsdalen

Christian Lomsdalen (born 14 May 1985) is the president of the Norwegian Humanist Association, elected in 2021.

== Career ==
He earned a master's degree in peace and conflict transformation at the University of Tromsø in 2012 and a master's degree in the history of religion at the University of Bergen in 2019. He is a research fellow at same university. He started the podcast Lektor Lomsdalens innfall in 2016.

== Norwegian Humanist Association ==
In 2021 he was elected president of the Norwegian Humanist Association, after having served as its vice president from 2019 to 2021.
