= Uma Nehru =

Indian independence activist and politician (1884–1963)

Personal details
- Born: 8 March 1884 Agra, North-Western Provinces, British India
- Died: 28 August 1963 (aged 79) Lucknow, Uttar Pradesh, India
- Party: Indian National Congress
- Spouse: Shamlal Nehru
- Children: Shyam Kumari Khan; Anand Kumar Nehru
- Relatives: See Nehru-Gandhi family
- Occupation: Indian independence activist, Lok Sabha member

Uma Nehru (8 March 1884 – 28 August 1963) was an Indian independence activist and politician.

== Career ==
In the early 20th century, she was a frequent writer in Stree Darpan, a woman's monthly magazine founded in 1909 by Rameshwari Nehru, in which she expressed feminist views.

She took part in the Salt March and the Quit India Movement and was subsequently imprisoned. After the independence, she was twice elected to the Lok Sabha from Sitapur in Uttar Pradesh. From 1962 until her death, she was a member of the Rajya Sabha.

== Personal life ==
Born in Agra, Nehru was educated at Saint Mary's Convent, Hubli. In 1901, she married Jawaharlal Nehru's cousin Shamlal. The couple had a daughter, Shyam Kumari, and a son, Anand Kumar. Anand Kumar Nehru's son Arun Nehru was a Union Minister in Rajiv Gandhi's government in the 1980s. Uma Nehru died on 28 August 1963 in Lucknow.

== Bibliography ==
- I primi passi del femminismo indiano: Rameshwari e Uma Nehru nell’India di inizio Novecento
