= Sonja Eggerickx =

Belgian secular humanist (born 1947)

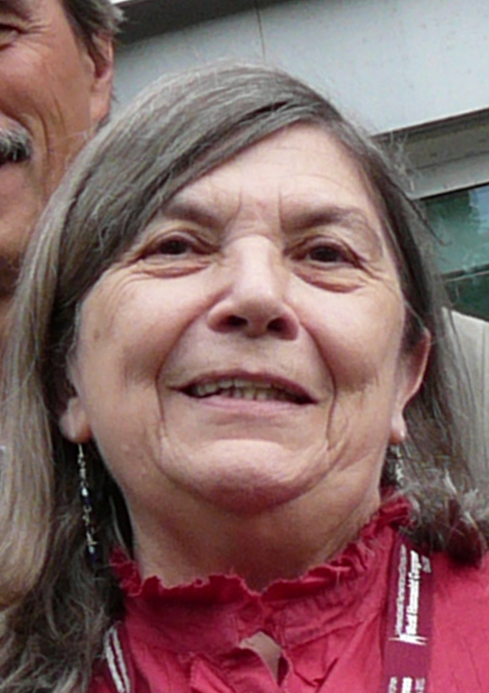
- Eggerickx in 2011
- Born: Sonja Albertine Jeannine Eggerickx; 8 February 1947 (age 79); Uccle, Belgium
- Education: University of Ghent

Sonja Albertine Jeannine Eggerickx (born 8 February 1947) is a Belgian secular humanist who was president of the International Humanist and Ethical Union (IHEU), now Humanists International, a position she held for nine years until stepping down in 2015. In 2016 she was awarded the Distinguished Services to Humanism Award 2016 for her ground-breaking work in secular education and ethics.

== Work in Humanism ==
Born in Uccle, Eggerickx studied at the University of Ghent gaining a degree in Moral Sciences, and became a teacher of non-confessional ethics. She worked from 1992 until her retirement in 2012 as a Senior Schools Inspector in Moral Education. While studying to become a teacher of "non-confessional (secular) ethics" she became a member of the Dutch Humanist association, Humanistisch Verbond (HV). She became active in the Humanist movement through her work as a teacher of secular ethics and was editor of MORES, a humanist magazine for teachers. In 1992 she attended her first conference of the IHEU (now Humanists International) and saw the importance of its international reach so applied for a position on the board of directors. She is President of the federation of Flemish Humanist organisations in Belgium (Unie Vrijzinnige Verenigingen).

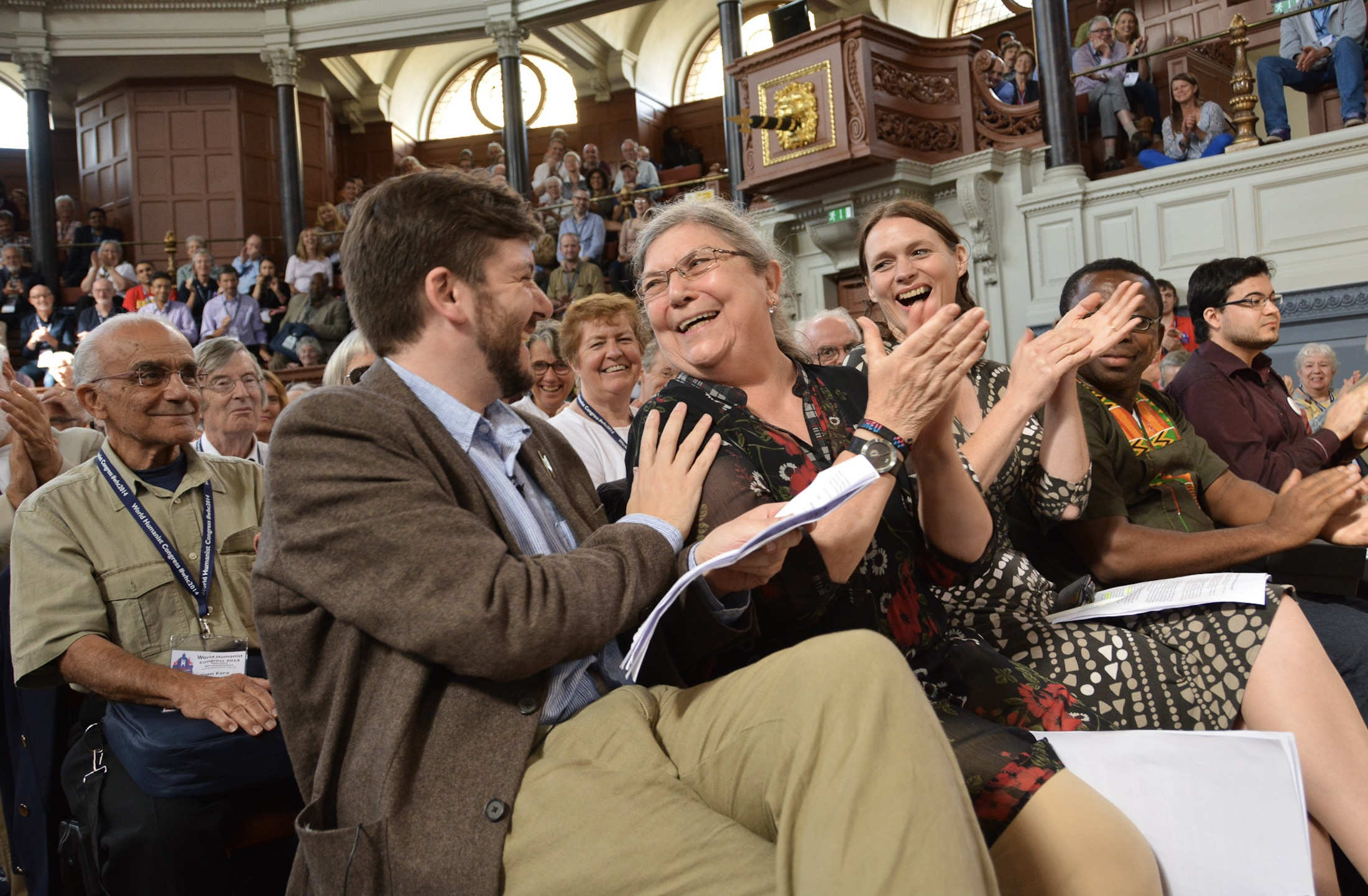
Sonja Eggerickx and Andrew Copson at the World Humanist Congress 2014

She was elected vice-president of the IHEU in 2002 and president in April 2006 in New York, becoming the organisation's first woman President.

Eggerickx has argued against the predominance of Catholic education in the Belgian school system, in favour of secularism and non-denominational schooling.

Belgian politician Joëlle Milquet named Eggerickx one of the '100 exceptional women', (100 Uitzonderlijke Vrouwen), having "co-written and shaped the history of equality between women and men." In 2016 Eggerickx was given the Distinguished Services to Humanism Award by Andrew Copson for her work "nine years as president of the IHEU and...many decades of ground-breaking work in secular education and ethics."

== Humanist views ==
Following the Charlie Hebdo shooting, Eggerickx, in her role as president of the IHEU, worked to promote a campaign against blasphemy laws in which the IHEU and the European Humanist Federation aim to support organisations involved in the defence of free speech, against persecution in countries with religious minorities and those working against punitive blasphemy laws. She has also spoken out against the treatment of prisoners of conscience as a result of blasphemy laws such as Raif Badawi and Asif Mohiuddin, calling Badawi's treatment "sickening" and a "gratuitous, violent sentence," and suggested laws which prevent criticism of religious institutions "is one reason why sexual abuse in the Catholic Church persisted so long."

Eggerickx has an interest in featuring and raising the profile of women within the Humanist movement. In 2012 she travelled to India to the Gora and Saraswathi Gora Atheist International Research Centre in Vijayawada and paid tribute to Saraswathi Gora's contribution to the atheist movement in India, saying,

women have an equally important role in promoting humanism and rationalism in the world.

Eggerickx has been vocal in condemning anti-gay laws and discrimination throughout the world. She has also spoken out publicly against Sharia law and supported the One law for all campaign against Sharia law in the United Kingdom, launched at the House of Lords, London, in 2008. Eggerickx was also involved in launching The Freedom of Thought Report, published annually since 2012 on International Human Rights Day, which examines the treatment of non-religious people, atheists and freethinkers across the member states of the United Nations.

== Other involvements ==
Eggerickx is a patron of Pink Triangle Trust, an educational charity which aims to educate LGBT men and women about Humanism and will also educate Humanists and the wider public about LGBT rights and homosexuality.
