= Ateistene =

Non-partisan irreligious society in Norway from 1974

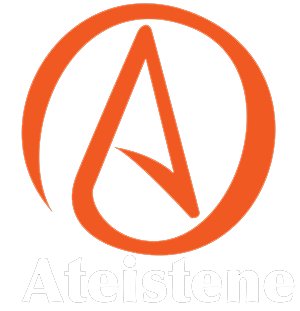
Logo of Ateistene.

Ateistene (English: The Atheists) is a non-partisan irreligious society that was established in 1974 and whose main focus is counteracting the Church of Norway and Christian influence in Norway.

The organization was established as Norwegian Heathen Society (Norwegian: Det norske Hedningsamfunn (DnH) or Hedningsamfunnet for short). The Heathen Society calls itself a humanist antireligious liberation movement. The organization advocates freedom of and, if need be, from religion and opposes Christian and Muslim influence.

Until the replacement of the Norwegian Penal Code in 2015, it challenged the so-called "blasphemy paragraph" in section 142 several times, which provided for punishment for anyone "who publicly insults or in an offensive manner shows contempt for any religious creed or for the doctrines or worship of any religious community lawfully existing [in Norway]". In 1982 it produced the cartoon Jesus Kristus & Co., depicting Jesus, which stirred considerable controversy. Charges were filed by the women's branch of the Christian Democratic Party, but later dropped.

Another of its actions was its successful demand for the right to call "God does not exist" from the rooftops after Oslo City Council granted a mosque the right to broadcast Adhan (prayer calls).

The society also supports the separation of church and state.

In 2017, the society changed its name to The Atheists (Norwegian: Ateistene)

In 2020, a history book about the organization was published; "Hedningsamfunnets historie" by Even Gran.

== Purpose ==
"The Norwegian Heathens' Society advocates man as the end and the togetherness of humans as the means of human society. We advocate liberation from authoritarian religions and from faiths belittling and dividing men, which rate the value of humankind according to man’s relation to a deity, and which use norms and dogmata to further inhibit human thoughts and emotions. We promote the freedom of confession and oppose any confession-based discrimination in general, and we oppose The Church of Norway and other religious institutions in particular."

== See also ==
- The Norwegian Humanist Association
