= World Population Foundation =

Non-profit organization

The World Population Foundation (WPF) was founded in 1987 in the Netherlands by Diana and Roy W. Brown. Their purpose was to create an organisation to draw attention to the effects of high birth rates and rapid population growth on maternal and infant mortality, communities and the environment, and to raise funds for population projects and programmes, with the ultimate aim of reducing world poverty and improving the quality of life of the world's poorest people.

From 1987 until 1994, WPF was a small organisation mainly supported by donations from the founders and by consultancy assignments. In 1994, the WPF played an important role in the Dutch delegation of the International Conference on Population and Development in Cairo, Egypt. At this conference, the Cairo Programme of Action was adopted which still serves as a foundation for WPF's work.

WPF works to reduce maternal and infant mortality, and improve sexual health and reproductive rights. It acknowledges that attention for these themes and to the improvement of services will contribute to the struggle against poverty worldwide. Therefore, WPF advocates the implementation of these themes in the UN's Millennium Development Goals.

2006–2009, the World Population Foundation's board members include Nafis Sadik, former executive director of UNFPA. As of 1 January 2011, Rutgers Nisso Groep and World Population Foundation (WPF) have merged under the new name Rutgers WPF. Chair of Rutgers WPF is Bert Koenders, former minister for Development Cooperation of the Netherlands.

== In developing countries ==
WPF mainly supports local organisations that provide young and underprivileged people with access to information and services concerning sexuality and reproduction.

WPF works to strengthen the capacity of local organisations, assists in developing and implementing activities, and provides management training. WPF's approach is based on Dutch policies on sexual and reproductive health, especially with regard to young people. As of 2006, WPF supported NGOs in nine countries.

Currently WPF maintains field offices in Pakistan, Vietnam and Indonesia (Rutgers WPF Indonesia).

== Advocacy activities ==
WPF engages in advocacy with policy makers in the Netherlands, Europe, and, at the international level, with the United Nations. Indirect advocacy includes public awareness creation through the Dutch media and with partner organizations in developing countries.

WPF is an active member of Share-Net and EuroNGOs. In 2004 WPF was granted 'Special Consultative Status' by the United Nations Economic and Social Council.

WPF established a youth organization: CHOICE for youth and sexuality. CHOICE went on to initiate the Youth Coalition and YouAct, a European youth network on sexual and reproductive health and rights.

In the Netherlands WPF is campaigning under the MYBODY label, with the slogan My Life, My Choice, MYBODY.

== See also ==
- Rutgers WPF Indonesia
