= Andrew Copson =

British humanist leader (born 1980)

Andrew Copson OBE
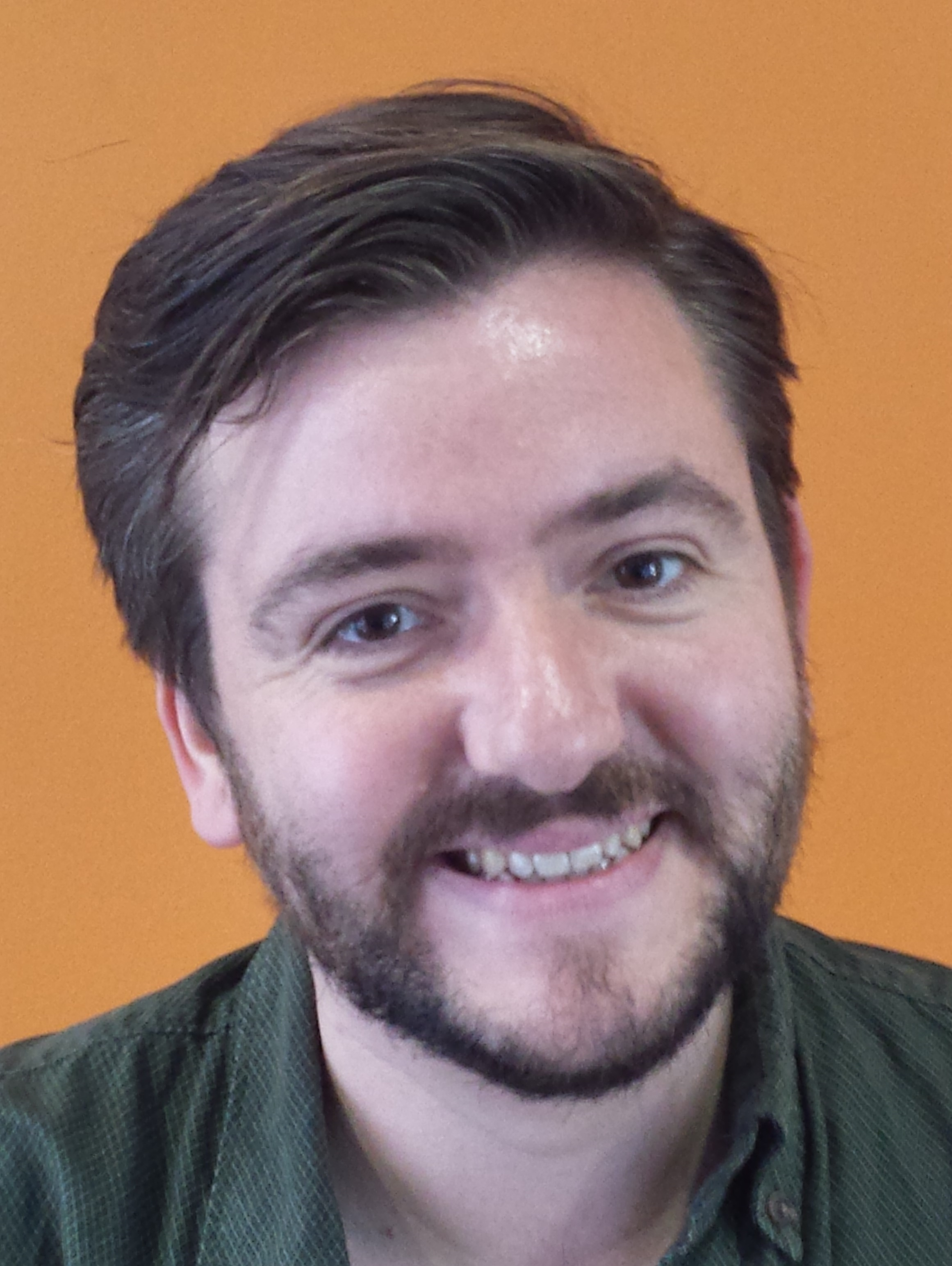
- Copson in 2015
- Born: Andrew James William Copson; 19 November 1980 (age 45); Nuneaton, Warwickshire, England
- Education: Balliol College, Oxford
- Occupation: Chief Executive of Humanists UK
- Spouse: Mark Wardrop (m. 2011)
- Parent(s): David Copson; Julia Heather Cunningham
- Andrew Copson's voice Recorded September 2015
- Website: andrewcopson.com

Andrew James William Copson OBE (born 19 November 1980) is a British humanist leader, civil society activist, and writer. He is the Chief Executive of Humanists UK, a former President and current Ambassador of Humanists International, and the author of a number of books on humanism and secularism. He was appointed an Officer of the Order of the British Empire (OBE) in the 2025 Birthday Honours for services to the Non-Religious Community.

== Early life ==
Copson was born on 19 November 1980 in Nuneaton, Warwickshire, England, to David Copson and Julia Heather Cunningham. He was educated at King Henry VIII School, Coventry, a private school that he describes as secular in its outlook. Coming from a working-class background, he went to the school as part of the government Assisted Places Scheme. He was brought up entirely without religion; as well as having non-religious parents, neither his grandparents nor his great-grandparents were religious and never had been. At secondary school, he first encountered Christianity, but rejected it when he did not see any truth in it.

He attended Balliol College, University of Oxford, initially studying Classics, then graduating in 2004 with a first-class Bachelor of Arts degree in Ancient and Modern History. He began volunteering for both the British Humanist Association and the Citizenship Foundation, an organisation that aimed to address democratic inequality on social, moral and political issues, after graduating from Oxford.

== Humanists UK (2005- ) ==
Copson first joined Humanists UK, known at the time as the British Humanist Association (BHA), in 2002 while at university: his mother had already been a member for some time. This was in response to a campaign Humanists UK was running at the time against the increase in the number of state schools run by religious organisations, or creationist academies.

In 2005, Copson started working at Humanists UK as director of education and public affairs. In December of the same year he won an award at the 2005 UK Young Education Programme, an organisation that promotes communication skills and rewards open debate on issues affecting society. In his role at the BHA he was responsible for campaigning for a secular state and promoting awareness of Humanism in schools and colleges and to the wider public.

In 2010, he became Humanists UK's youngest ever Chief Executive at the age of 29, having been appointed by the Board of Trustees the previous November, a position that he described at the time as "obviously a daunting one", saying that he felt "a huge responsibility to build on the BHA's many successes."

He is a former director of the European Humanist Federation, and has acted as representative of Humanist organisations to the United Nations, the Foreign and Commonwealth Office and the Organization for Security and Co-operation in Europe.

== Humanists International (2010-25) ==
Copson served on the board of Humanists International (formerly the International Humanist and Ethical Union, or IHEU) for fifteen years, from 2010 to 2025. In 2015, Copson was elected President taking over from the award-winning Belgian Humanist Sonja Eggerickx and served in that role for a decade, stepping down at the organization's General Assembly in Luxembourg in July 2025. He was succeeded as president by the American humanist Maggie Ardiente.

Copson's presidency was described as a "transformational era" for Humanists International during which Copson "led sweeping changes to Humanists International, making the General Assembly more democratic and the Board more globally diverse". During his tenure, the organization's global reach expanded considerably. Membership grew, and the diversity of the board and general membership increased, with greater representation from humanist groups in Africa, Asia, and South America. The organization underwent significant professionalization, moving from a largely volunteer-run body to a professional non-governmental organization with a Chief Executive and expert staff. He oversaw a strategic rebranding, changing the organization's name from the IHEU to Humanists International in 2019 to create a more unified identity. In a farewell tribute on behalf of the Humanists International Board, Guatemalan humanist David Pineda praised Copson for his focus on making the organization less Eurocentric, bringing "visibility to the struggles and the courage of humanists in the global south" and for creating a "more democratic, transparent, and inclusive" organization. Copson chaired the group that produced the revised Amsterdam Declaration of 2022.

As President, Copson worked to amplify the humanist voice on the global stage, expanding the organization's advocacy work, particularly at the United Nations and the Council of Europe. Humanists International launched several major initiatives during this period, including the annual Freedom of Thought Report, which documents global discrimination against the non-religious, and the international "End Blasphemy Laws" campaign. A key development was the creation of the "Humanists at Risk" programme, which provided direct support, public campaigning, and diplomatic assistance to humanists facing persecution, discrimination, or violence for their beliefs.

In June 2025, in recognition of his service to the global humanist movement, Copson was presented with the Nordic Humanist Honorary Award by the Nordic humanist organizations in Stockholm, with Trond Enger of the Norwegian Humanist Association saying that Copson had "championed the rights of non-religious people in every corner of the globe, from defending persecuted atheists in authoritarian regimes to supporting grassroots humanist organizations in emerging democracies". At the General Assembly in Luxembourg in July, he was presented by Dr Sudesh Ghoderao with the Honorary Award of the Federation of Indian Rationalists for "promoting the global partnership, broadening support for humanist groups around the world" and "creating cross-cultural and international relationships" and by Mary Jane Quiming with the Honorary Award of the Humanist Alliance Philippines International (HAPI) for "dedication, compassion and advocacy with a lasting impact on our work and the Filipino community." He was also awarded the Humanists International Distinguished Services to Humanism award 2025 for "his transformative leadership and global advocacy over a decade of presidency".

Copson delivered his farewell address at the 2025 General Assembly, which Humanists International called "a message of gratitude, reflection and enduring hope for the international humanist movement". Copson reflected on the organization's growth but also called for continued global solidarity within the movement, saying: "Humanism, by its very nature, should transcend borders and nationalistic sentiments… but even we are not immune to the tidal power of nationalism and isolationism which is distorting global civilisation in our times." Following his presidency, Copson stated he would rejoin the General Assembly as the head of the Humanists UK delegation. He was created an Ambassador of Humanists International alongside Pakistani humanist and women’s rights activist Gulalai Ismail and Nepalese humanist leader Uttam Niraula.

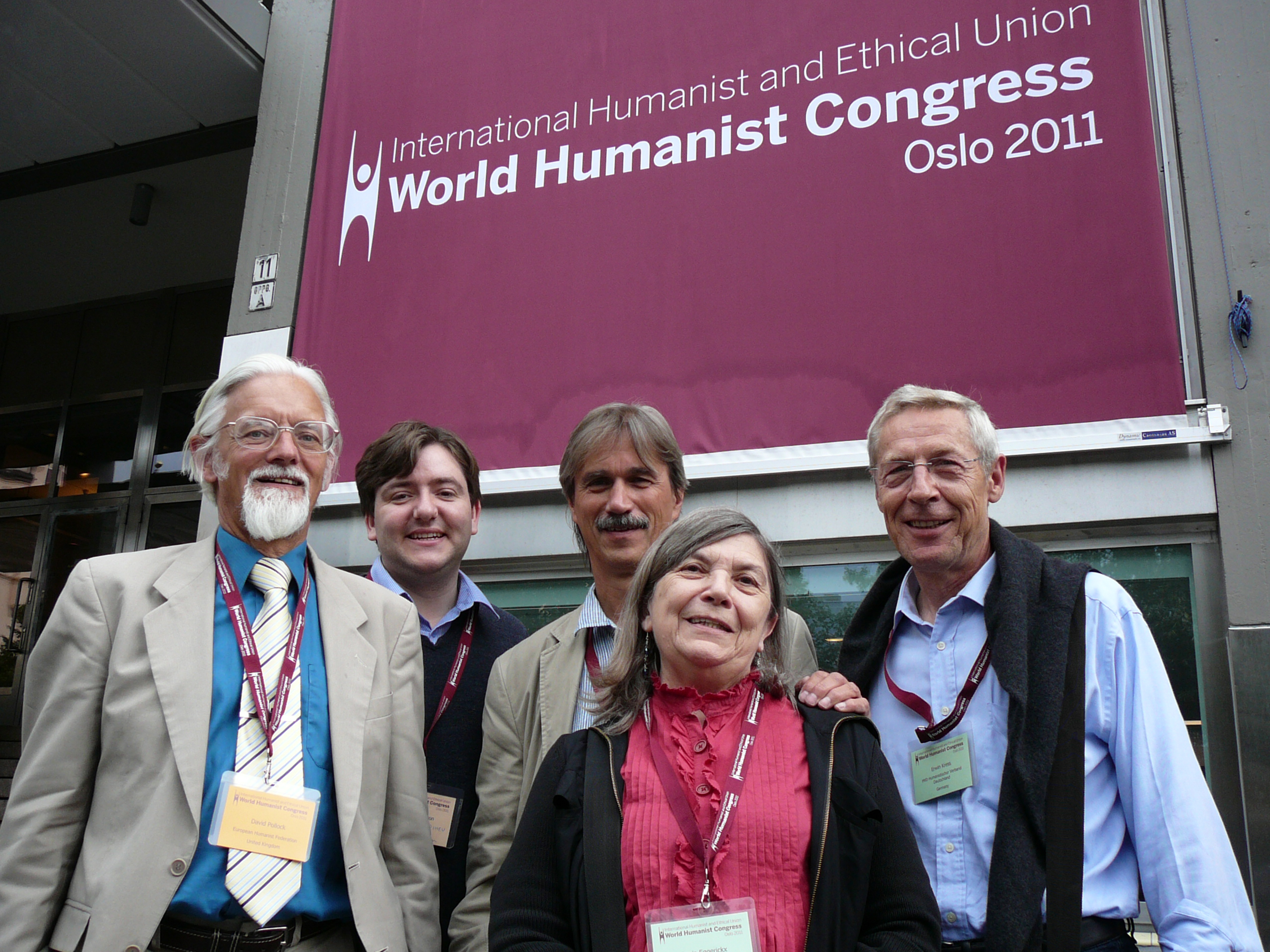
Copson (second left) at the 2011 IHEU World Humanist Congress

== Other Positions ==
As of 2018, Copson is a trustee of the following organisations:

- The Actors of Dionysus
- International Humanist Trust
- Electoral Reform Society
- Religious Education Council of England and Wales (Treasurer)

In the past, he has been on the executive committees of the Labour Humanists, Religious Education Council of England and Wales, Oxford Pride, of which he was a founding member in 2003, was chair of the Gay and Lesbian Humanist Association and has been a trustee of many organisations including All Faiths and None, the National Council for Faiths and Beliefs in Further Education, European Humanist Federation, Conway Hall Ethical Society (stepping down at the AGM on 10 November 2013) and the Values Education Council.

He is also a fellow of the Chartered Management Institute and the Royal Society of Arts and a member of the Chartered Institute of Public Relations, European Humanist Professionals and the Association of Chief Executives of Voluntary Organisations.

== Bibliography ==
- The Wiley Blackwell Handbook of Humanism (2015: Wiley), editor with A. C. Grayling.
- Secularism: Politics, Religion, and Freedom (2017: Oxford University Press)
- Secularism: a very short introduction (2019: Oxford University Press)
- The Little Book of Humanism (2020: Piatkus), with Alice Roberts
- The Little Book of Humanist Weddings (2021: Piatkus), with Alice Roberts
- Understanding Humanism (2021: Routledge), with Richard Norman and Luke Donnellan
- The Little Book of Humanist Funerals (2023: Piatkus), with Alice Roberts
- What I Believe: Humanist ideas and philosophies to live by (2024), editor.

== Views ==
Andrew Copson defining the terms 'humanism' and 'religion' at the European Skeptics Congress 2015

Copson is a regular contributor to New Humanist magazine, has written for The Guardian, New Statesman, The Times and The Independent, and has been interviewed on BBC News, ITV, Channel 4 and Sky for non-religious opinions on topics such as religious symbols in the workplace and euthanasia. He was one of the editors of The Wiley Blackwell Handbook of Humanism, a collection of essays that explore Humanism as the way of life. He also contributed a foreword to Filling the Void: A Selection of Humanist and Atheist Poetry, edited by Jonathan M.S. Pearce in 2016, and contributed to The Case for Secularism: A neutral state in an open society, a collection of essays from the Humanist Philosophers Group in 2014.

When asked whether his attitude to Humanism included scientific skepticism, he said: "A Humanist is someone who puts human welfare and the welfare of other sentient beings at the centre of their morality. Humanism is characterised by skepticism and the scientific method."

Copson has also spoken widely on the subject of secularism, the separation of religion from the state, particularly in regard to children's education, civil ceremonies such as marriages and funerals, Human Rights law, against the automatic right of unelected Anglican bishops to sit in the House of Lords and the provision of religious chaplains in institutions such as the prison system and hospitals and hospices. He states his opinion as freedom of belief, that people should be free to believe whichever religion they choose and the law should not discriminate against a person because of those beliefs.

"It is about equal respect, human rights, and a safe public space where all have the right to participate."

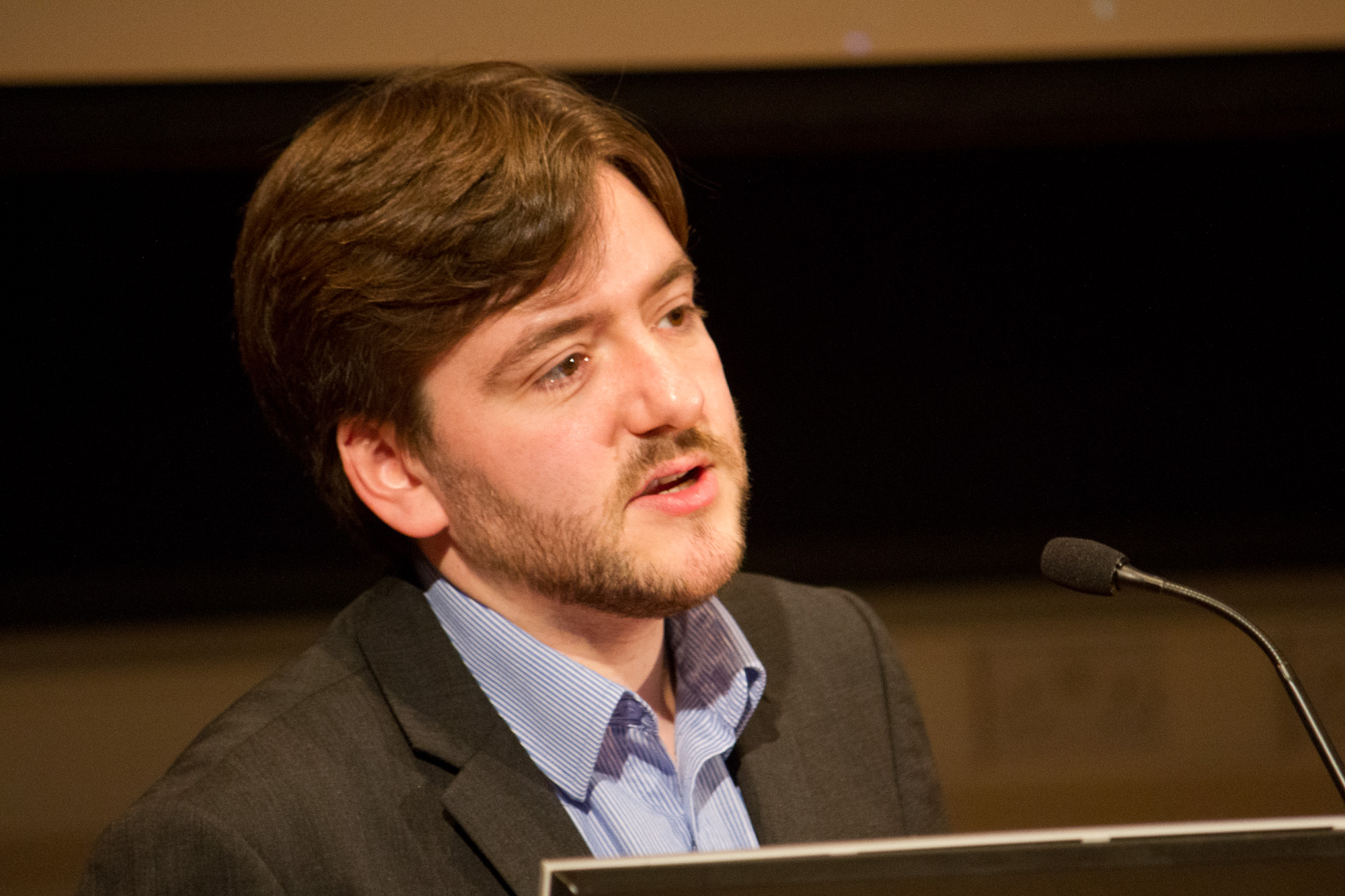
Andrew Copson speaking in 2012

Along with biologist and author Richard Dawkins, Copson has questioned the need for "atheist churches", an idea posited by Alain de Botton in response to a Humanist debate over the idea of creating an atheist temple, and has expressed doubt in regards to future success of The Sunday Assembly. He has also spoken frequently in regard to state education in England and the provision of non-religious schools and evidence-based teaching, both in his capacity as Chief Executive of the BHA and as a lifelong Humanist. Copson commented:

"It is vital that every young person receives a broad and balanced education, including teaching evolution as the only evidence-based view of how life came to be."

He considers collective worship and the teaching of religion in schools "one of the biggest education debates of our time."

Copson has also spoken publicly about the murders in Bangladesh of atheist bloggers Washiqur Rahman, Avijit Roy and the attack on his wife Rafida Ahmed, and Ananta Bijoy Das, calling on the Bangladeshi government to "do more to protect all its citizens from brutal fundamentalist thugs who would kill another human being for daring to think outside the confines of dogmatic religion."

He has also criticised the attempts of Nicolas Sarkozy in France to ban the burkini from French public beaches on the grounds that it disproportionately attacks women, demonises Muslim women specifically and is incompatible with religious freedom of choice.

On the subject of his own non-religious beliefs, Copson has expressed unease with the way Humanism is often defined negatively by what one does not believe in, for example a lack of belief in god or gods and in 2016 said:

"Many humanists, and I would certainly count myself among them, don't even care about the question of god one way or another. I wouldn't even go so far as to say I'm an atheist. The question of whether there's a god or not has no meaning or relevance in my life whatsoever."

In a 2025 interview, Copson described his own humanism as having been formed by a combination of his secular working class upbringing, representing "the idea that ethics arise from human needs and social living, and that community solidarity is part of the good life", and his academic education in history and Classics, which involved "critical thinking, imaginative sympathy, understanding context and tracing the development of ideas." He said "what the classicist and humanist Gilbert Murray called 'Hellenic humanism' still provides many of my cultural reference points"

== Personal life ==
In 2011, Copson entered into a civil partnership with Mark Wardrop.

== See also ==
- Atheism
- Civil and political rights
- Freethought
- Humanism
- Human rights
- Rationalism
- Skepticism
