= International Association of Lawyers against Nuclear Arms =

- Formation: 1988
- Type: Political advocacy
- Headquarters: Berlin
- President: Christopher Weeramantry
- Website: en.ialana.de

The International Association of Lawyers against Nuclear Arms (IALANA) is an international non-governmental organisation headquartered in Berlin. It was founded in 1988 and seeks "to build and strengthen international legal efforts to ban the use and threat of use of nuclear weapons." Its membership consists of individual lawyers and lawyer's organisations. The current co-presidents of the organisation are Peter Becker and Takeya Sasaki. The German section of the organisation was co-founded by former German Minister of Justice Herta Däubler-Gmelin. IALANA had a central role in the process that sought an advisory ruling on the legality of nuclear arms from the International Court of Justice.

The organisation has consultative status with the United Nations Economic and Social Council.

== See also ==
- International Court of Justice advisory opinion on the Legality of the Threat or Use of Nuclear Weapons
- Parliamentarians for Nuclear Non-Proliferation and Disarmament
- Treaty on the Prohibition of Nuclear Weapons
