= Tom Copson =

English singer-songwriter

- Born: Tom Copson; 13 October 1984 (age 41)
- Origin: Cambridge, United Kingdom
- Genres: Acoustic, folk, indie pop, folk rock
- Occupation: Singer-songwriter
- Instruments: Vocals, guitar,
- Years active: 2006–present
- Label: Independent artist.
- Website: www.tomcopson.com

Tom Copson (born 13 October 1984) is an English singer-songwriter, independent artist, musician and performer of acoustic music. He released a live album "Live at CB2" in 2011, followed by his first studio album Woven in 2012.

Copson was raised in Cambridge, England. His first experiences were as part of a group called Eske. After leaving the band he developed his career busking in England and Europe.

== Career ==
Copson has received positive reviews for his live performances. In 2009 Copson self-released his first solo material as an EP entitled Will my soul still make it home?

His first release since securing a deal with UK-based independent label Chiwawa Records was a live acoustic EP, which was recorded in his home town of Cambridge, entitled Tom Copson – Live at CB2.

=== Woven ===
Copson's debut album Woven was released on 18 March 2013. Tom Robinson from BBC Introducing recently played the opening track "Afraid to Fall" twice on his 6music show. Copson worked with producer Stu Reid, accompanied by a band of their friends and families, and recorded the album in churches.

=== Cloud Not A Star ===
Copson's next album ‘Cloud Not A Star' was released on 16 April 2021.
