= Roy W. Brown =

British activist

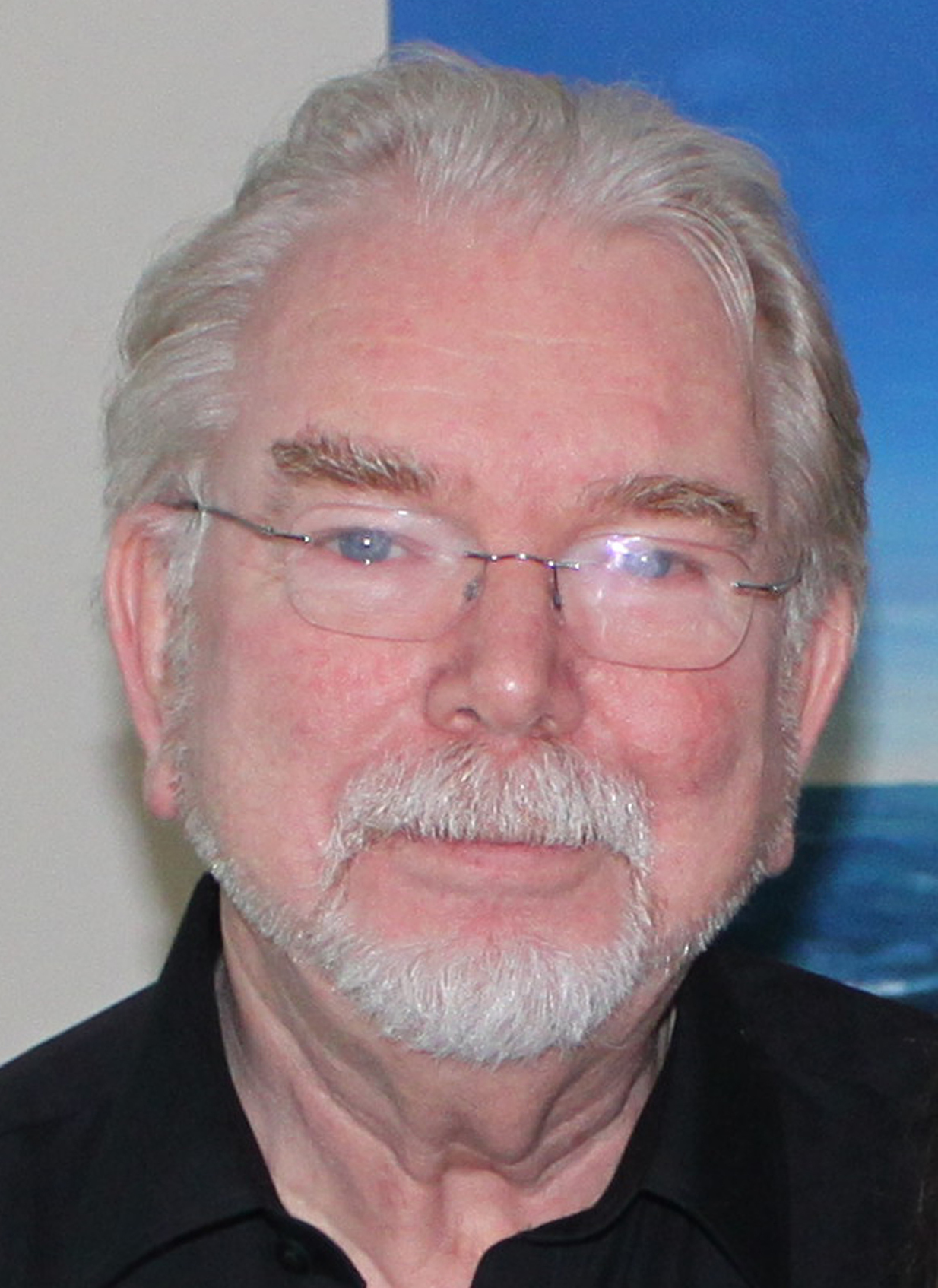
- Roy W. Brown
- Born: 2 November 1937 (age 88); London, England
- Education: Martin School, East Finchley
- Spouse: Diana
- Engineering career
- Discipline: Engineering, humanism and human rights activism
- Institutions: International Humanist and Ethical Union
- Employer: Metier Management Systems

Roy W. Brown (born 2 November 1937) is a British-born engineer, humanist and human rights activist. He was president of the International Humanist and Ethical Union (IHEU) from 2003 to 2006 and was for a time its main representative at the United Nations, Geneva.

== Early years ==
Roy Brown was born in London on 2 November 1937. He was educated at the Martin School, East Finchley and The Haberdashers' Aske's Boys' School, an Independent school in Elstree in Hertfordshire, and the University of London where he read engineering. He trained as an engineer with ITT in London working on the development of electronic systems, and the UK Atomic Weapons Research Establishment at Orford Ness and Aldermaston where he was part of the team developing monitoring systems for the international Test Ban Treaty. After emigrating to Canada where he worked for four years with Canadian Marconi in Montreal on the design of airborne radar and navigation systems he returned to the UK as Chief Designer for Racal Research in Tewkesbury, pioneers in the field of Computer Aided Design.

== Metier Management Systems ==
In 1976, with three colleagues: Richard (Dick) Evans, Robin Lodge and James Miller, Brown founded Metier Management Systems in London, the first company to develop and market mini-computer-based systems for the management of large scale projects. Their first product, Apollo, launched in 1977, was the first Project Management System to run on a minicomputer but was limited to network planning and scheduling. It was joined in 1978 by a sister product, Artemis which incorporated cost and resource management, and became the world's first commercially successful relational database system.

By the early 1980s, Artemis systems were in use in over 30 countries providing management information for some of the world's largest civil, aerospace, nuclear and military projects, including the construction of off-shore oil platforms, aircraft development, the construction of five military cities in the Middle East, the maintenance of the US navy fleets at Long Beach and Norfolk Naval Yard, aerospace projects, nuclear power plant maintenance, and production scheduling in the UK and US automobile industries.

From 1978 until 1982, as the business grew, Metier developed Artemis systems for other platforms including Hewlett Packard and IBM mainframes. From 1980 Metier embarked on an ambitious programme to develop their own RISC-based computer hardware and a complete software rewrite, to be called Artemis 2.

By 1985 when the partners sold the company to the Lockheed Corporation, one of their biggest customers, Metier had 700 employees (of whom 70 were shareholders) and offices in 21 countries.

== World Population Foundation ==
Brown moved to the Netherlands in 1984 where with his wife Diana he founded the World Population Foundation (WPF) to promote family planning: a major factor in improving the quality of life of women and families, and solving the problems of human development and rapid population growth in developing countries.

By 1993 WPF had become one of the leading population advocacy organisations in Europe, and in 1994 played an important role in the Dutch delegation to the International Conference on Population and Development, (ICPD), held in Cairo.

In 1996, WPF became a founding member of Eurongo, the European network of NGOs working in the field of Sexual and Reproductive Health and Rights, Population and Development, an organisation first proposed in 1991 by Brown, Sjaak Bavelaar (at that time executive director of WPF), and Ann Allport of CARE International.

WPF played a significant role in persuading the Dutch government to treble its funding for population assistance in 1998, becoming the largest single donor to the UN Population Fund. In 1999 WPF became more widely known when it was chosen by the UN to host the Hague Forum on Population and Development.

In 1998 Brown handed over the chairmanship of WPF to Nicolaas Biegman, former Dutch ambassador to the UN, but remained on the board until 2012.

== International Foundation for Population and Development ==
The family moved to Switzerland in 1987.

In 1999, together with Christine Magistretti, Charles Riolo and Frederick Naville, Brown became a founding member of the board of the International Foundation for Population and Development based in Lausanne Switzerland. Working with their partner organisation, the Centre for the Study of Social Change, CSSC, in Mumbai, India, IFPD created the WIN program, opening 20 clinics providing primary health care for mothers and their children, family planning, skills training and literacy classes for young women and girls in the slums around Bandra East. As of 2010, WIN was providing services to a population of over 80,000 people.

== International Humanist and Ethical Union ==
Brown was brought up as a Methodist but became a Humanist when he met his second wife Diana. He became a life member of the British Humanist Association, the National Secular Society and the Council for Secular Humanism, but only became active in the Humanist movement after attending the 14th World Humanist Congress in Mumbai in 1999. He became a member of the IHEU Committee for Growth and Development later the same year and chair of the Committee in 2000. He was elected a vice-president of IHEU in 2001, and president in 2003. He served as president until 2006.

Prior to the 50th anniversary of the foundation of IHEU, Brown acted as co-ordinator of the project to update its founding document, the Amsterdam Declaration. The Amsterdam Declaration 2002 was adopted unanimously that year by the 15th World Humanist Congress and the IHEU General Assembly as "the official defining statement of World Humanism".

As president of IHEU Brown initiated a process of decentralisation with the appointment of a number of regional representatives to work closely with the more than 100 IHEU member organisations in over 40 countries. In 2004 in Kampala, Uganda he inaugurated the launch of the African Humanist Alliance, uniting Humanist, secular and freethought organisations around Africa.

== Human Rights at the UN ==
Since 2004 Brown has also served as IHEU Main Representative at the UN, Geneva, where he has worked at the UN Commission on Human Rights and its successor, the Human Rights Council. Brown has prepared written submissions and spoken at the plenary sessions of the Commission and Council on issues as diverse as Female Genital Mutilation, the plight of the Dalits in India, slavery in North Africa, witchcraft and witch hunts in Africa, freedom of expression, the concept of defamation of religion, the incompatibility of the Cairo Declaration of Human Rights in Islam with the Universal Declaration, and the role of the Holy See in attempting to cover up the child abuse scandal and its failure to honour its obligations under the International Convention on the Rights of the Child.

== A Vision for Europe ==
In 2006 the German Chancellor, Angela Merkel, announced plans to celebrate the 50th anniversary of the foundation of the European Union with a declaration to be known as the Berlin Declaration that was to make reference to Europe's "Christian roots". The declaration was to be signed by all 27 heads of government of the European Union and would become the preamble to the proposed new European Constitution. Brown proposed a campaign to challenge this potentially divisive idea which promised to neglect not only other faiths but Humanism, secularism and Europe's debt to the Enlightenment.

IHEU agreed to work on a joint campaign, "A Vision for Europe", with the European Humanist Federation and the international NGO Catholics for a Free Choice to create an alternative to the Berlin Declaration, be called "the Brussels Declaration" to set out Europe's common heritage based on the values of the Enlightenment. Brown was appointed co-ordinator of the campaign.

The drafting process ran from October 2006 until January 2007 and involved hundreds of conversations and some 15 preliminary drafts. The Brussels Declaration was presented to the representative of the European presidency at the European Parliament on 27 February 2007, one month before the date of the anniversary celebrations, and addressed to all 27 heads of government with a plea that the values set out in the Brussels Declaration be incorporated into the Berlin Declaration.

The campaign was successful. When the Berlin Declaration was promulgated on 27 March 2007, three heads of government refused to sign because the declaration contained no reference to God, religion or Europe's supposed Christian heritage, and the declaration was eventually signed only by Angela Merkel as president of the European Council, Hans-Gert Pottering, president of the European Parliament, and Jose Maunuel Barroso, President of the European Commission. The declaration was then incorporated as the Preamble into the daft of the European Constitution.

One of the reasons for the success of the campaign was that rather than attempt to obtain a million or more signatures from ordinary citizens the campaign enlisted the support of 1000 leading Europeans including elder statesmen, religious leaders and Nobel laureates, all with considerable influence in their respective countries.

One not entirely unexpected result of the campaign was that a furious Pope Benedict XVI declared that "Europe has lost its soul" and demanded an invitation to address the European parliament. When the invitation was eventually received however the Pope declined, stating that the Parliament had become "too secular".

== Awards ==
1999, with his wife Diana, Council for Secular Humanism "Distinguished Humanists" award

2006, the Free Press Prize of the Danish Free Press Society, together with the Norwegian-Pakistani comedian Shabana Rehman. The prize announcement stated that "Roy Brown has been a tireless advocate of free speech as part and parcel of human rights. He has thus made an invaluable contribution to the defence of the open society and freedom of expression."

In 2008, Brown received the IHEU Distinguished Service to Humanism award for, among other things, his work representing the IHEU at the UN Human Rights Council in Geneva.
