= Indian Humanist Union =

The Indian Humanist Union (IHU) is an Indian Humanist organisation established in 1960 by Narsingh Narain.

The genesis of the Indian Humanist Union lay in an earlier society called the Society for Promotion of Freedom of Thought (SPFT) established in 1954 at Allahabad (India) by Narsingh Narain, a former teacher, civil servant and concurrent philosophy scholar. Later, when he learnt of the International Humanist & Ethical Union, as a sequel to the "Amsterdam Declaration" (1952), he changed the nomenclature of SPFT to "The Humanist Union" which he founded in 1960 at Nainital with the primary objective of the diffusion of knowledge concerning moral and social problems considered from the Humanist point of view, which, briefly according to IHU, stood for two basic values - love for fellow beings coupled with the scientific spirit of free enquiry. IHU is affiliated to the Humanist International (formerly known as International Humanist and Ethical Union IHEU). The official symbol of the IHU is a version of the Happy Human.

The first Chairman of the IHU was P N Sapru, former High Court Judge and Member of Indian Parliament. Narsing Narain who was working as the first General Secretary of the Union succeeded PN Sapru as the Chairman of IHU.

In 1966, Indian Humanist Union commenced the publication of a quarterly journal, The Humanist Outlook, devoted to the furthering of the scientific attitude, ethical values, social reform and communal harmony.

In 1970 at the joint initiative of Narsingh Narain and Abe Soloman, a distinguished humanist & Life Member of IHU the Humanist Endowment Fund Society, was set up by some members of the IHU to provide financial stability to the humanist movement in India. On his death in 1972 Narsingh Narain bequeathed all his life's savings to this Society. The Corpus of HEFS has continued to grow steadily though slowly, mainly through further donations by dedicated members.

After the death of Narsingh Narain, Shyam Kumari Khan, a noted social worker, General Secretary of the Indian Council for Child Welfare, Member of the Indian Parliament and a Founder Member of the IHU was elected as the new Chairperson.

Shyam Kumari Khan was succeeded by Sajid Hussain a former Member of the U.P. Legislative Assembly and Life Member of IHU.

Sajid Hussain was succeeded by Prakash Narain, a Founder Member of IHU with a brilliant academic record and a rich experience in the United Nations and the Government of India which included working as Chairman of the Railway Board and Principal Secretary to the Govt. of India and also as Secretary to Govt. of India in several other Ministries.

IHU is devoted primarily to the furtherance of human values and the building of a more humane society through an ethics based on human perceptions and capabilities without linking it with any supra-human entity, that is, on assessments made in a spirit of reason and free enquiry. Its endeavours are oriented towards bringing about attitudinal changes amongst humanists and others through diverse means like bringing out a quarterly journal and other publications, development of humanist music cassettes, staging of street plays, holding of periodical discussions, Symposia and Seminars as well as collaborative network linked voluntary social work.

The annual Narsingh Narain Memorial Seminars specially receive wide coverage in the national and international media which helps in spreading humanist values into a wider spectrum of society. The IHU also participates actively in the International humanist movement in regard to organizational and conceptual matters.
