= Levi Fragell =

Norwegian humanist

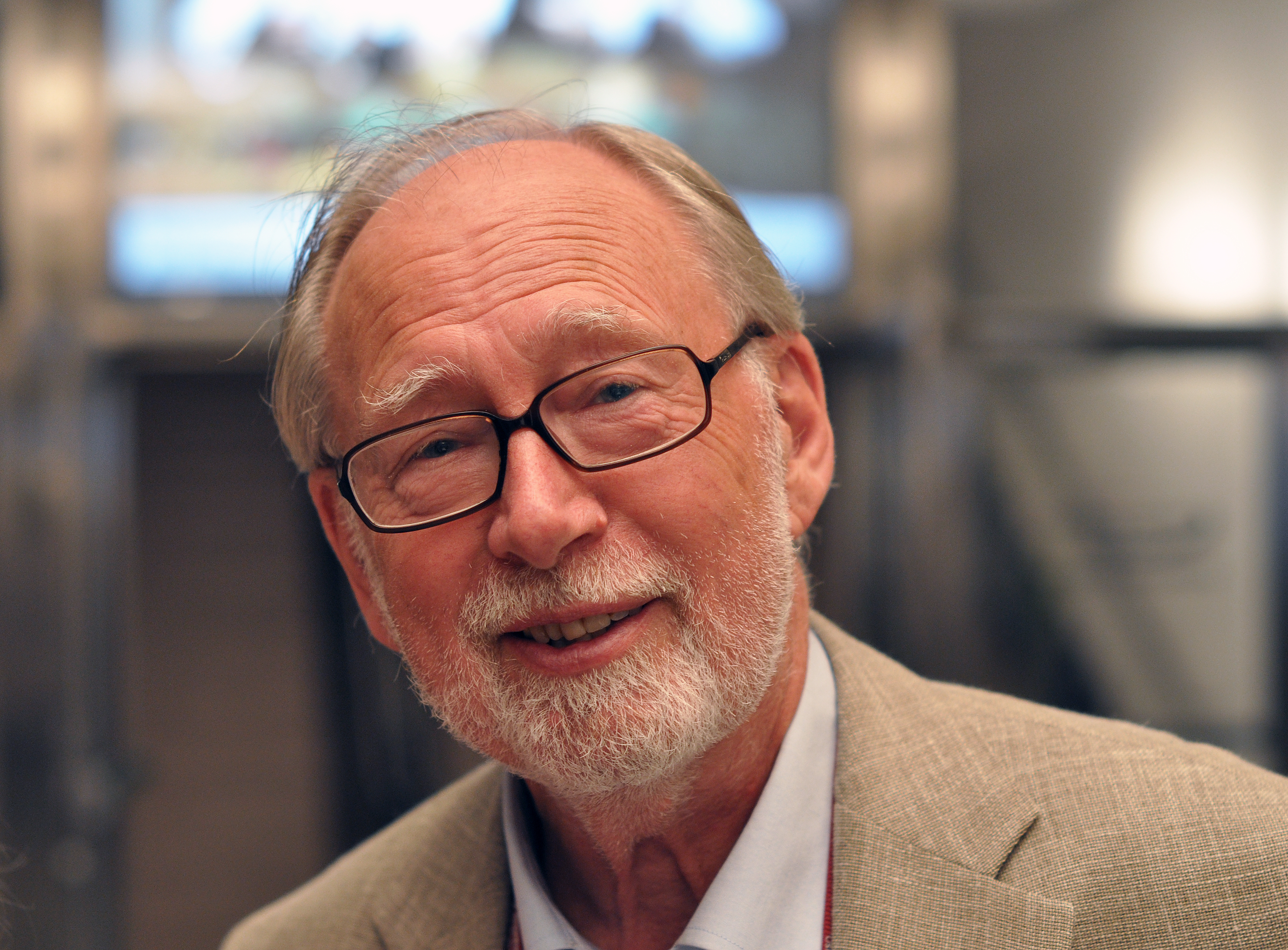
Fragell at the World Humanist Congress 2011 in Oslo

Levi Fragell (born 30 March 1939) is a Norwegian humanist. He has been chairman and secretary of the Norwegian Humanist Association, and was President of the International Humanist and Ethical Union (IHEU) between 1987–1990 (as one member of a troika) and, in his own right, between 1998–2003.

== Biography ==
His father was a Pentecostal preacher and in his teens Fragell also began working full-time as a preacher, before his studies in philosophy and comparative religion led him to leave the church. He took a University degree in the sociology of religion and then worked for a year as a school teacher in northern Norway, before becoming a journalist, and later working in marketing. He also became press secretary to several cabinet ministers in Norway.

In 1976, he became leader of the Norwegian Humanist Association (Human-Etisk Forbund) at a time when it had 1500 members; its membership later grew to over 75,000 making it, as a proportion of national population, the largest such organisation in the world. He joined the board of the IHEU in the 1980s, becoming its co-president in 1987 and sole president between 1998 and 2003. In 2003, he was one of the signers of the Humanist Manifesto. He later became Chair of the IHEU's Committee on Growth and Development, and has travelled widely to promote humanism, oppose racism and religious intolerance. In 2008, he was awarded a Lifetime Achievement Award by the IHEU. Periyar Maniammai University, Thanjavur of the south Indian state of Tamil Nadu, conferred the Doctor of Letters (Honoris causa) on Fragell, he delivered the 21st Convocation Address on 4 July 2014 of the University.
