= Humanists International =

Secular humanism advocacy organization

- Formation: 1952; 74 years ago
- Founders: Julian Huxley; Jaap van Praag; Harold Blackham
- Founded at: Amsterdam, Netherlands
- Type: International non-governmental organisation
- Legal status: 501(c)(3) organization
- Headquarters: London, United Kingdom
- Region served: Worldwide
- President: Maggie Ardiente
- Chief Executive: Gary McLelland
- Board of directors: Maggie Ardiente, Roslyn Mould, Yvan Dheur, Alavari Jeevathol, David Pineda, Leo Igwe, Nina Fjeldheim, Fraser Sutherland, Monica Belitoiu
- Website: humanists.international
- Formerly called: International Humanist and Ethical Union (1952–2019)

Humanists International (known as the International Humanist and Ethical Union, or IHEU, from 1952–2019) is an international non-governmental organisation championing secularism and human rights, motivated by secular humanist values. Founded in Amsterdam in 1952, it is an umbrella organisation made up of more than 160 secular humanist, atheist, agnostic, rationalist, skeptic, freethought and Ethical Culture organisations from over 80 countries, as of 2025.

Humanists International campaigns globally on human rights issues, with a specific emphasis on defending freedom of thought and expression and the rights of the non-religious, who are often a vulnerable minority in many parts of the world. The organisation is based in London but maintains a presence at the United Nations Human Rights Council in Geneva, the United Nations General Assembly in New York, and the Council of Europe in Strasbourg, among other international institutions. Its advocacy work focuses on shaping debates on issues associated with humanism, the rights of the non-religious, and promoting humanist attitudes to social issues.

Humanists International is particularly active in challenging blasphemy and apostasy laws around the world and at the UN. Its annual Freedom of Thought Report indexes the world's countries by treatment of the non-religious and their commitment to freedom of thought and expression. Working with its member organisations, it also helps to coordinate support for those fleeing danger from states which persecute the non-religious. It advocates a humanist approach to various social issues, contributing to bioethical debates and arguing in favour of sexual and reproductive health and rights, LGBT rights, children's rights and women's rights, and in opposition to slavery and caste discrimination.

Outside of its advocacy work, Humanists International functions as the democratic organ of the global humanist movement. It holds a general assembly each year and a World Humanist Congress usually every three years. The 2025 General Assembly was held in Luxembourg in July 2025. The 2026 World Humanist Congress was held in Ottawa, Canada, in August 2026.

Humanists International works to stimulate the growth of humanism and freethought and the spread of Enlightenment values around the world by supporting activists to form effective organisations in their home countries. In 2022, the Humanists International general assembly unanimously adopted the Amsterdam Declaration 2022, which presents as "the official defining statement of World Humanism".

Its official symbol, the Happy Human, is shared with its member organisations worldwide.

== Humanism as a life stance ==
In 2022, at the organisation's 70th anniversary General Assembly, delegates voted to replace the previous Amsterdam Declaration 2002 with the Amsterdam Declaration 2022.

Previously, in 2002, at the organisation's 50th anniversary World Humanist Congress, delegates unanimously passed a resolution known as the Amsterdam Declaration 2002, an update of the original Amsterdam Declaration (1952).

The Amsterdam Declaration 2002 defined Humanism as a "lifestance" that is "ethical", "rational", supportive of "democracy and human rights", insisting "that personal liberty must be combined with social responsibility"; it is "an alternative to dogmatic religion"; it values "artistic creativity and imagination" and is aimed at living lives of "fulfillment" through the powers of "free inquiry", "science" and "creative imagination".

In addition to the Amsterdam Declaration's "official statement of World Humanism", Humanists International provides a "Minimum Statement on Humanism":

Humanism is a democratic and ethical life stance, which affirms that human beings have the right and responsibility to give meaning and shape to their own lives. It stands for the building of a more humane society through an ethic based on human and other natural values in the spirit of reason and free inquiry through human capabilities. It is not theistic, and it does not accept supernatural views of reality.

Member Organisations of Humanists International are required, according to its membership regulations, to have objects that are "consistent" with this understanding of Humanism.

=== Other major resolutions ===
At the World Humanist Congress in 2005, in France, the General Assembly adopted The Paris Declaration 2005 on state secularism, which states:

There can be no freedom of conscience when religions rule societies. Secularism is the demand for equal rights for those who belong to any religion as well as for those who belong to none... For IHEU (International Humanist and Ethical Union) and its member organizations, the State must be secular, that is, neither religious not atheist. But demanding genuine democratic equality, recognized by the Law, between believers and humanists does not mean that the member associations of IHEU treat all philosophical points of view equally. We have no duty to respect irrationalism, however ancient its origins. True Humanism is the flourishing of freedom of conscience and the methods of free inquiry.

In 2007, in an "unprecedented alliance" of the (then) International Humanist and Ethical Union, the European Humanist Federation and Catholics for Choice, launched the Brussels Declaration, a secular response to a proposed Berlin Declaration, under which the amended EU Constitution would have made references to "God" and the "Christian roots of Europe". It made specific reference to policy positions on equality and human rights for different minority groups, concluding: "The principles and values on which European civilisation is founded are once again under threat. We call upon the people of Europe and all who care for freedom, democracy and the rule of law to join us in promoting and protecting them."

At World Humanist Congress 2011, in Norway, the Humanists International General Assembly adopted The Oslo Declaration on Peace, which concludes: "We urge each of our member organizations and Humanists globally to work for a more peaceful culture in their own nations and urge all governments to prefer the peaceful settlement of conflicts over the alternative of violence and war."

At World Humanist Congress 2014, in the United Kingdom, the Humanists International General Assembly adopted The Oxford Declaration on Freedom of Thought and Expression, which asserts: "Freedom of thought implies the right to develop, hold, examine and manifest our beliefs without coercion, and to express opinions and a worldview whether religious or non-religious, without fear of coercion. It includes the right to change our views or to reject beliefs previously held, or previously ascribed. Pressure to conform to ideologies of the state or to doctrines of religion is a tyranny."

In 2017, Humanists International held a special conference on threats to humanism and liberal democracy from rising authoritarian populism and extremism as part of its general assembly in London. At the following general assembly in Auckland, New Zealand, in 2018, Humanists International members agreed The Auckland Declaration on the Politics of Division, which condemned a recent global resurgence of demagogy, "exemplified in a new generation of so-called "strong men" politicians, who purport to stand up for popular interests, but who are eager to diminish human rights and disregard minorities in order to gain and retain power for their own ends". The Declaration commits humanist organisations "to addressing the social causes of the politics of division: social inequality, a lack of respect for human rights, popular misconceptions about the nature of democracy" and affirms the "values of democracy, rule of law, equality, and human rights."

In 2019, Humanists International members unanimously passed the Reykjavik Declaration on the Climate Change Crisis, acknowledging the scientific consensus on anthropogenic climate change and committing the international humanist movement to "foster a social and political commitment to urgent action and long-term policymaking to mitigate and prevent climate change."

In 2025, the humanist community passed the Luxembourg Declaration on Artificial Intelligence and Human Values, committing to upholding and promoting ten "principles" for ethical adoption of artificial intelligence, offered as a summation of the humanist community's stance on AI and as a contribution towards global regulation of artificial intelligence and AI alignment efforts. The statement was adopted with input from global thought leaders in artificial intelligence, including Kate Devlin.

== Organisation ==
=== Founding in 1952 ===
Five Humanist organisations—the American Ethical Union, American Humanist Association, British Ethical Union (later the British Humanist Association and now Humanists UK), Vienna Ethical Society and the Dutch Humanist League—convened a founding congress in Amsterdam in August 1952, establishing the International Humanist and Ethical Union (IHEU). Delegates adopted five resolutions, including a statement of the fundamentals of "modern, ethical Humanism" that became known as the Amsterdam Declaration (1952).

=== Development and later history ===
Early IHEU congress resolutions linked the organisation to post-war internationalism, including commitments aligned with United Nations human-rights ideals and an intention to seek NGO relations with UNESCO. In 1965, the board formulated ten characteristics describing what "ethical humanism" stood for; the text was adopted at the 1966 congress and later became known as the "Paris statement".

In the 1990s, the organisation developed baseline texts intended to be usable across a diverse membership. A "Minimum Statement on Humanism" was adopted in 1991 and revised in 1996. The organisation also professionalised parts of its administration and opened a London office in February 1997. By its first 50 years, the IHEU had grown to include more than 100 member organisations and was headquartered in London.

The IHEU was granted special consultative status with the United Nations Economic and Social Council (ECOSOC) in 2000. In 2012, the organisation began publishing the Freedom of Thought report on discrimination against atheists and other non-religious people.

At its 2017 General Assembly, delegates passed a resolution mandating a change of name from the International Humanist and Ethical Union and directing the Board to oversee a transition to a revised organisational identity. In February 2019, Humanists International was adopted as the organisation's operating name and brand, replacing the longer IHEU name with a shorter public identity for its international federation of member organisations.

The organisation continues to operate through separately incorporated entities. In the United States it operates as Humanists International Inc (EIN 52-2194803; tax-exempt since 2002). In the United Kingdom, a charitable company incorporated in November 2020 was initially registered as Humanists International and later renamed Humanists International 2020 (company number SC682230). The UK entity is registered with the Office of the Scottish Charity Regulator as charity SC050629.

=== Current structure ===
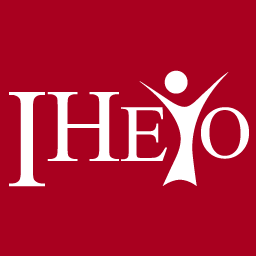
The former IHEYO logo, prior to rebranding as Young Humanists International

Humanists International is a democratic organisation, the Board of which is elected by representatives of the member organisations at annual General Assemblies. The President as of 2025 is Maggie Ardiente. Humanists International is structured as two companies: a US not-for-profit 501-c(3) registered in New York and a charity registered in Scotland. It shares a registered US address in Washington, DC with the American Humanist Association, along with a UK address in Glasgow, Scotland.

Representatives of Humanists International member organizations ratify new memberships annually during a General Assembly, which is hosted by a different member organisation each year. Following the 2025 General Assembly, it listed its membership as 120 Member Organisations from over 60 countries. Member organisations pay one per cent of their overall income to the international body. This in turn funds international advocacy, resources, and support for member organizations across every continent.

Humanists International maintains delegations to the United Nations Human Rights Council in Geneva, the United Nations in New York, and the Council of Europe in Strasbourg. It is an international NGO with Special Consultative Status with the United Nations, General Consultative Status at the Council of Europe, Observer Status with the African Commission on Human and Peoples' Rights, and maintains operational relations with UNESCO. It also supports its members to participate in domestic and international advocacy, including the Universal Periodic Review, and supports its European members through its European Policy Forum advocacy project.

Humanists International has a wing for people aged up to 35 called the Young Humanists International.

The organization's 2017 General Assembly passed a resolution "mandating the Board to oversee a transition to a revised identity for the organization". The rebrand to Humanists International, a new operating name for the IHEU, was completed in February 2019.

=== Board members ===
Humanists International is governed by an international board of directors, whose body is elected by member organisations at annual general assemblies, including a directly elected president.

As of July 2025, the Board of Humanists International comprises:

- Maggie Ardiente (President) – Secular Coalition for America/American Humanist Association
- Roslyn Mould (Vice President) – Humanist Association of Ghana
- Yvan Dheur (Treasurer) – deMens.nu (Flemish Community, Belgium)
- Leo Igwe – Humanist Association of Nigeria
- Alvari Jeevathol – Humanists UK
- Mary Jane Quiming – Humanist Alliance Philippines, International
- Nina Fjeldheim – Norwegian Humanist Association
- David Pineda – Humanistas Guatemala
- Fraser Sutherland – Humanist Society Scotland
- Monica Belitoiu – Romanian Secular Humanist Association

=== Staff and ambassadors ===
Humanists International has a staff team of 10 based remotely, primarily across Europe and Asia, headed by Chief Executive Gary McLelland. It has teams focused on freedom of thought casework, UN advocacy, communications, supporting member organizations, and internal operations.

In addition, Humanists International has three appointed "ambassadors", who are described as "leading humanists from around the work who work with the Board of Humanists International to help promote our aims and objectives" – all of whom are former Board members. As of July 2025, its ambassadors are:

- Gulalai Ismail – US-based Pakistani human rights activist in exile; founder of Aware Girls
- Uttam Niraula – Nepalese humanist organizer and human rights campaigner; founder of Nepal Society for Humanism
- Andrew Copson – UK-based humanist writer and campaigner; former President of Humanists International

=== Membership ===
Humanists International is a membership federation of humanist organisations. Organisational membership is divided into Full Members, Specialist Members and Associate Members. Full membership is intended for established national democratic membership organisations (including umbrella organisations). Specialist membership is intended for non-membership organisations (for example educational institutions, academic institutes, publishers and trusts) that actively support humanism. Associate membership is intended for local humanist organisations, newly formed national membership organisations, and organisations for which promoting humanism is not the primary activity.

Applications for organisational membership (and changes in organisational membership status) are decided by the General Assembly on the basis of an application and recommendations from the Board. Between General Assemblies, the Board may grant provisional membership, which is subject to confirmation by the next General Assembly. Organisational members are expected to comply with the organisation's bylaws and to provide information needed for periodic recalculation of membership dues.

Membership dues are payable annually. Dues are set by membership category and are calculated on the basis of an organisation's recurrent income, with minimum contribution levels. The dues regulations (including inflation adjustments) are reviewed at least every three years. Organisations in arrears may lose the right to attend and vote at the General Assembly until dues are settled or an arrangement is agreed.

The organisation has also offered an individual membership scheme, including free individual membership for people in countries where establishing or joining a humanist organisation would be illegal.

At the end of 2022, Humanists International had 60 Members and 70 Associates (130 organisational members and associates in total). At the end of 2024, it had 61 Members and 55 Associates (116 in total).

=== World Humanist Congress ===
The World Humanist Congress is Humanists International's flagship international gathering and is typically held alongside meetings of its General Assembly (the organisation's decision‑making forum for member organisations). Congress and General Assembly meetings are used to coordinate international campaigning, adopt declarations and policy resolutions, and conduct organisational business such as elections and membership decisions.

World Humanist Congresses are hosted in different countries over time. Congresses are typically delivered in partnership with a Humanists International member organisation (or member organisations) acting as local host(s).

==== World Humanist Congresses ====
World Humanist Congresses (themes and documented outcomes)
No.	Year	Host city (country)	Themes and notable outcomes
1	1952	Amsterdam (Netherlands)	Theme: “Humanism and Ethical Culture”. Founding congress of the organisation (then the International Humanist and Ethical Union) and adoption of the Amsterdam Declaration (1952); the congress also recorded support for the Universal Declaration of Human Rights and an application for consultative status at UNESCO.
2	1957	London (United Kingdom)	Congress discussions addressed the organisation's views on philosophy, personal and social life, and mission; adoption of a resolution on nuclear weapons (“the atomic weapon and human survival”).
3	1962	Oslo (Norway)	Theme: “In Search of Long Range Goals for Humanism”. Adoption of multiple resolutions including calls for a new perspective on international life and support for the Food and Agriculture Organization’s Freedom from Hunger campaign.
4	1966	Paris (France)	Theme: “The humanist response to the problems and aspirations of man”. Adoption of a “Paris Statement” outlining features of humanism; resolutions also included one congratulating UNESCO on its 20th anniversary and committing support for UNESCO's aims and ideals.
5	1970	Boston (United States)	Theme: “To seek a humane world”. First congress held outside Europe; discussion included youth protest movements and environmental concerns. Resolutions included support for the United Nations on its 25th anniversary and a human-rights resolution reaffirming commitment to the Universal Declaration of Human Rights.
6	1974	Amsterdam (Netherlands)	Theme: “The Humanist Revolution”. Resolutions included support for UN initiatives (including the 1974 World Population Conference and International Women's Year); International Humanist Award presented to Harold John Blackham.
7	1978	London (United Kingdom)	Theme: “Working for human needs in a just society”. Adoption of a human-rights declaration and resolutions on limiting population growth, women's equality and choice, and concerns about neo‑fascism; International Humanist Award presented to V. M. Tarkunde.
8	1982	Hanover (West Germany)	Theme: “Antihumanistic trends: challenge and response”. Adoption of resolutions including on attacks on humanism by dogmatic or fundamentalist forces, homosexuality, arms transfers, and human rights; creation of the role of International Humanist Ombudsman.
9	1986	Oslo (Norway)	Theme: “Humanists say yes to life”. Adoption of statements/resolutions including on sexual exploitation of children, the UN International Year of Peace, international solidarity, ending nuclear weapons tests, and urging action against apartheid in South Africa.
10	1988	Buffalo (United States)	Theme: “Building a world community: humanism in the 21st century”. Adoption of resolutions including welcoming détente and calling for a complete ban on nuclear tests.
11	1990	Brussels (Belgium)	Theme: “The secularisation of society on the basis of liberty, equality and fraternity”. Programme focus included tolerance as political culture and threats to women's rights linked to religion.
12	1992	Amsterdam (Netherlands)	Theme: “Humanism for head and heart” (40th anniversary year). Adoption of resolutions on human rights and development and on peace, alongside country‑specific statements including on Poland's abortion law and religious education in Northern Ireland; statements also addressed Vatican positions on lesbians and gay men and committed to including women's issues in plenary sessions.
13	1996	Mexico City (Mexico)	Theme: “Global Humanism for the Cyber Age”. Sessions included the “infomedia” revolution and global humanism, humanist values and development, and secularism in the Middle East in a “cyber age”.
14	1999	Mumbai (India)	Theme: “Humanism for human development and happiness”. Adoption of policy statements including on caste discrimination, euthanasia, organ donation after death, and LGBT human rights.
15	2002	Noordwijkerhout (Netherlands)	Theme: “All different – all equal: human diversity, human rights, humanism”. Marked the 50th anniversary of the 1952 declaration and adopted the Amsterdam Declaration 2002, updating the 1952 statement.
16	2005	Paris (France)	Theme: “Separation of religion and state” (linked to the centenary of France's 1905 law). Adoption of the Paris Declaration on state secularism and a statement condemning terrorism and violence committed in the name of religion.
17	2008	Washington, D.C. (United States)	Theme: “Out of many, one: reclaiming humanistic values”. Adoption of resolutions including on science/education and on abolishing corporal punishment of children; General Assembly sessions included discussion of UN human‑rights processes and organisational work in Africa.
18	2011	Oslo (Norway)	Theme: “Humanism and peace”. Adoption of the Oslo Peace Declaration and resolutions including on humanist chaplaincy/pastoral care for non‑religious military personnel and on anti‑corruption measures.
19	2014	Oxford (United Kingdom)	Theme: “Freedom of thought and expression”. Programme included more than 40 events with more than 70 speakers; adoption of the Oxford Declaration on Freedom of Thought and Expression.
–	2020	Miami (United States) (planned)	Planned congress was cancelled due to the COVID-19 pandemic; organisational decision‑making was conducted through an online General Assembly instead.
20	2023	Copenhagen (Denmark)	First in‑person congress since 2014; delegates adopted the declaration “Democracy: a humanist value” and passed further resolutions addressing challenges to democracy.
21	2026	Ottawa (Canada) (planned)	Planned congress in Ottawa (7–9 August 2026); theme announced as “Humanism as Resistance”.

=== Programmes ===
Ongoing programme work combines member support and capacity building with international advocacy and protection-related casework.

==== Movement-building and organisational development ====
Capacity-building support includes a “Growth & Development” plan that combines training and other capacity-building events with grantmaking intended to strengthen humanist organisations and groups and support movement-building in different regions. The programme has used small grants to support locally delivered projects by humanist organisations and groups, and has reported an expansion of grantmaking from the late 2010s onward.

Grantmaking has included multiple strands (for example, development grants, digital humanism grants, and grants linked to humanist ceremonies, youth participation, and community-format “Café Humaniste” events), reflecting a mix of organisational development and public-facing movement-building work. A public register of supported projects is maintained by the organisation, summarising funded initiatives and host organisations over time. Member-facing support has also included practical resources intended to help organisations develop their work (for example guidance materials and peer support through a “twinning” scheme that links organisations for mutual exchange and learning).

==== Advocacy training and coordination ====
Advocacy support includes training and coordination to help member and associate organisations engage with international human-rights mechanisms, including the Universal Periodic Review (UPR). Guidance has included a detailed UPR briefing and calendar resources, as well as workshops for organisations in countries due for review, covering civil-society roles in the process, advocacy planning, and drafting written submissions and preparing oral interventions. Reported outputs of this work have included training for participants from member and associate organisations, member-led written submissions, and joint statements delivered at the United Nations Human Rights Council in connection with UPR adoption sessions.

Alongside UPR-focused activity, member organisations receive access to broader advocacy-oriented resources (including guidance and toolkits used in campaigning and engagement with policy processes).

==== Humanists at Risk ====
Protection-related casework is organised through the “Humanists at Risk” programme, which supports individuals facing persecution, threats, harassment, or other serious harm linked to their humanist identity or non-religious beliefs, including cases involving detention or criminal charges. Requests for assistance have been reported as frequent, and casework prioritisation is used to focus on people assessed to be at the greatest risk and where support is most feasible.

Forms of assistance described for the programme include letters supporting asylum claims; public campaigning and advocacy (including raising cases with international institutions and state authorities); networking and coordination with member organisations on the ground; and referrals or signposting to other forms of support when direct assistance is not possible. Casework processes described for the programme include intake of requests, verification and needs assessment, provision of support (which may include coordination with relocation initiatives and emergency support), and ongoing communication and follow-up; many cases are handled confidentially for safety and privacy reasons. The organisation has also published periodic reporting connected to the programme's work, including a 2020 action report examining risks faced by non-theists in multiple countries and describing advocacy and support responses linked to such cases.

==== Young Humanists International ====
Young Humanists International (YHI) is the organisation's youth section, focused on connecting and supporting young humanists (aged 18–35) through networking, learning opportunities and support for youth-led activities. The youth section was previously known as the International Humanist Ethical Youth Organization (IHEYO).

Structurally, YHI operates within the wider federation and is organised through a Young Humanists International Committee, appointed from among young representatives nominated by member organisations and associates. The youth section also recognises a network of “Young Humanists International affiliates”, connecting youth organisations and groups associated with the federation's members.

== International institutional engagement ==
Humanists International engages with intergovernmental and regional human-rights institutions through formal accreditation and consultative arrangements. These statuses provide channels for non-governmental organisations to contribute expertise and participate in meetings and related processes, including through written submissions and interventions in public sessions.

=== United Nations ===
Humanists International holds special consultative status with the United Nations Economic and Social Council (ECOSOC). ECOSOC consultative status is the framework used for NGO participation across parts of the UN system, including accreditation pathways for engagement with UN human-rights mechanisms.

Within the UN Human Rights Council system, NGOs in ECOSOC consultative status may participate as observers, including attending public meetings, submitting written statements, making oral interventions and organising side events under the Council's procedures. Under its former name, the International Humanist and Ethical Union, the organisation has submitted joint written statements for Human Rights Council sessions. Humanists International has also taken the floor in Human Rights Council debates on Universal Periodic Review outcomes.

=== Council of Europe ===
The Council of Europe grants international non-governmental organisations (INGOs) a “participatory status” as a framework for structured cooperation. INGOs with participatory status form the Conference of INGOs of the Council of Europe and take part in its General Assembly and committee work.

Humanists International has participatory status with the Council of Europe. Under the European Social Charter's collective complaints procedure, it is among the international NGOs entitled to submit collective complaints.

=== African Commission on Human and Peoples’ Rights ===
At its 44th Ordinary Session (2008), the African Commission on Human and Peoples’ Rights granted observer status to the International Humanist and Ethical Union. The Commission's observer-status criteria set out participation channels for recognised NGOs, including attending public sessions, requesting to make statements, proposing agenda items and accessing non-confidential Commission documents under the Commission's rules.

=== UNESCO ===
UNESCO maintains “official partnership” relations with non-governmental organisations under categories including consultative relations, governed by UNESCO's directives on partnerships with NGOs. Humanists International has consultative relations with UNESCO as an NGO in official partnership.

== Strategy and activities ==
The aim of Humanists International is to "build, support and represent the global humanist movement, defending human rights, particularly those of non-religious people, and promoting humanist values world-wide". As a campaigning NGO, Humanists International aims "to influence international policy through representation and information, to build the humanist network, and let the world know about the worldview of Humanism."

=== The Freedom of Thought Report ===
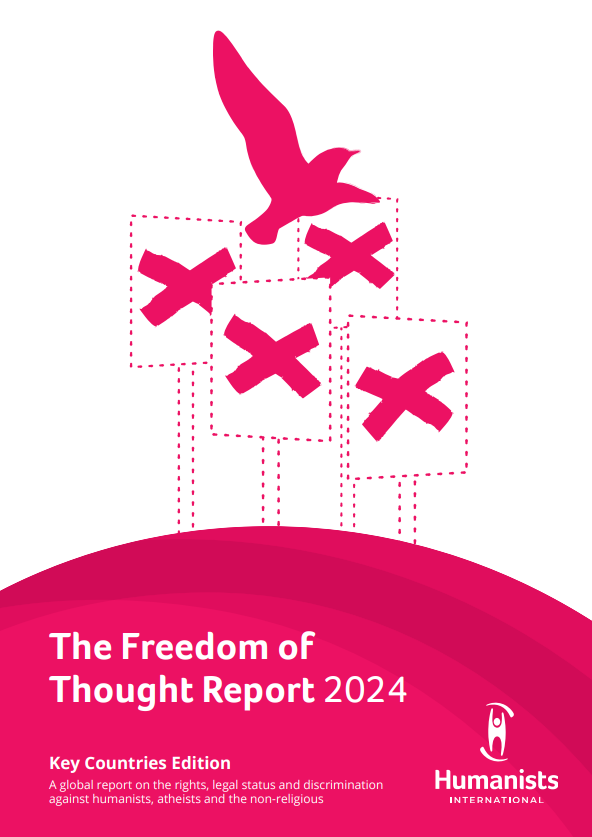
Cover of the 2024 Freedom of Thought Report

Humanists International began publishing an annual Freedom of Thought Report in 2012. The report examines every country in the world for its record on upholding rights and equality for non-religious people, including humanists and atheists. The online edition includes a country chapter for each country in a "Country Index". Humanists International also makes available a downloadable PDF "Key Countries Edition".

Each country is assessed against a range of "boundary conditions", with each condition associated with one of four thematic strands ("Constitution and government", "Education and children's rights", "Society and community", and "Freedom of expression, humanist values") and placed at one of five severity levels ("Free and equal", "Mostly satisfactory", "Systemic discrimination", "Severe discrimination" and "Grave violations"). Humanists International makes the assessment data available under a Creative Commons Attribution-ShareAlike 4.0 license.

==== Findings of the Freedom of Thought Report ====
The report includes maps that colour countries by the most severe boundary condition applied in each category, as well as a "Summary score" based on average severity across all four categories.

Freedom of Thought Report 2024 – Summary score

Key

Grave violations (5) Severe discrimination (4) Systemic discrimination (3) Mostly satisfactory (2) Free and equal (1) No rating

Freedom of Thought 2024 Report: basic summary scores by country (1 = best, 5 = worst).

=== Focus of advocacy and campaigns ===
Recurring themes of Humanists International's advocacy and campaigns work include LGBTI rights and women's rights, sexual and reproductive health and rights, laws against blasphemy and apostasy, caste-based discrimination, slavery, and advocacy of secularism.

==== Persecuted non-religious individuals ====
Individuals persecuted for expressing their non-religious views (actual or perceived) have frequently been the subject of IHEU campaigns. Some prominent cases include:

- In the 1990s, IHEU was instrumental in highlighting the threats against Taslima Nasrin, who lives in exile from Bangladesh and who also acted as a representative of the IHEU at UNESCO.
- The IHEU and Amnesty International led the campaign in 2004 to try to obtain the release of Younus Shaikh, who was accused of "blasphemy" in Pakistan.
- In 2013, the IHEU urged the authorities in Egypt to ensure the safety of Alber Saber after he was accused of "offending religion" for allegedly linking to the YouTube video Innocence of Muslims.
- In 2014, the IHEU blew the whistle on the case of Mubarak Bala from Nigeria, who was detained in a psychiatric hospital after he talked openly about being an atheist. He was freed following international media coverage.
- In 2017, after a government minister in Malaysia said members of an atheist meetup group would be "hunted down", the IHEU called for respect for the atheists' human rights, and the organization's condemnation of the minister's remarks was reported in Malaysian media.

The IHEU delegation at the United Nations Human Rights Council has repeatedly raised the imprisonment and corporal punishment of Raif Badawi for "insulting religion", and Waleed Abulkhair for "disrespecting the authorities", both in Saudi Arabia.

Humanists International similarly highlights cases where individuals are accused of "apostasy", such as the blogger Mohamed Cheikh Ould Mkhaitir currently on death row in Mauritania, and the poet Ashraf Fayadh currently imprisoned in Saudi Arabia. In June 2016 at the 32nd session of the Human Rights Council, the IHEU's delegate took the unusual step of reading one of Ashraf Fayadh's poems during General Debate.

==== Bangladesh machete murders ====
Humanists International (then the International Humanist and Ethical Union, IHEU) said it had raised concerns about threats to secular writers and activists in Bangladesh as early as 2006, describing secular intellectuals as being "terrorised" by Islamist fundamentalists. From 2013, as a series of machete attacks targeted secular and atheist bloggers and freethinkers, it issued repeated statements and campaign calls in response and highlighted the killings at the UN Human Rights Council. In early 2013 it responded to the murder of blogger and activist Ahmed Rajib Haider and the attack on Asif Mohiuddin, and criticised the subsequent arrest and prosecution of bloggers for "hurting religious sentiments".

In 2015–2016 the organisation continued to comment publicly on individual killings and attacks, including the murder of writer Avijit Roy on 26 February 2015. It also publicised the case of writer Ananta Bijoy Das, including excerpts from correspondence about his rejected visa application to Sweden, following his murder on 12 May 2015. After a coordinated attack against two separate publishing houses in Dhaka on 31 October 2015, in which publisher Faisal Arefin Dipon was killed, and publisher Ahmedur Rashid Chowdhury was seriously injured, the organisation published an interview with Chowdhury about the attack and his escape to Norway. It coordinated a coalition open letter calling on the Bangladeshi government to protect threatened writers and repeal laws used against secular bloggers; the initiative was also reported by bdnews24.com. Humanists International and partner organisations organised solidarity events abroad, including a "solidarity book fair" in The Hague held alongside the annual Ekushey Book Fair in Dhaka. After further killings in 2016, its president Andrew Copson warned that unless the government defended free expression, "the only voices that will be heard will be those of murderous extremists".

==== End Blasphemy Laws campaign ====
In January 2015, in part as a response to the Charlie Hebdo shooting, Humanists International, alongside other transnational secular groups the European Humanist Federation and Atheist Alliance International and a two-hundred-strong organisational coalition, founded the End Blasphemy Laws Campaign. End Blasphemy Laws is "campaigning to repeal "blasphemy" and related laws worldwide."

==== Other campaigns ====
The "First World Conference on Untouchability" was organised by Humanists International in London, June 2009. Anticipating the event, the BBC News quoted then-Executive Director Babu Gogineni as saying that legal reforms alone would not end caste discrimination: "There are Dalit politicians in India, but nothing has changed. The answer is to educate Dalits and empower them." The event was preceded by questions in the UK Parliament, and guests included Lord Desai and Lord Avebury from the UK House of Lords; Binod Pahadi, Member of the Constituent Assembly, Nepal; and Tina Ramirez, US Congressional Fellow on International Religious Freedom. The Second World Conference on Untouchability was held in Kathmandu, in April 2014.

In 2013, Humanists International criticized the US-based Appeal of Conscience Foundation for awarding their "World Statesman Award" to then-president of Indonesia Susilo Bambang Yudhoyono; it argued that the award "is a slap in the face to prisoners of conscience across the world. While Alexander Aan suffers in an Indonesian jail for posting his beliefs to Facebook, his jailer will be honored in New York as a champion of freedom of belief."

A year later, Humanists International, as part of a "coalition of secular groups", led a campaign around the hashtag "#TwitterTheocracy" to protest the social media website Twitter's implementation of tools blocking "blasphemous" tweets in Pakistan.

== Historical dates and figures ==
=== Chairs and presidents ===
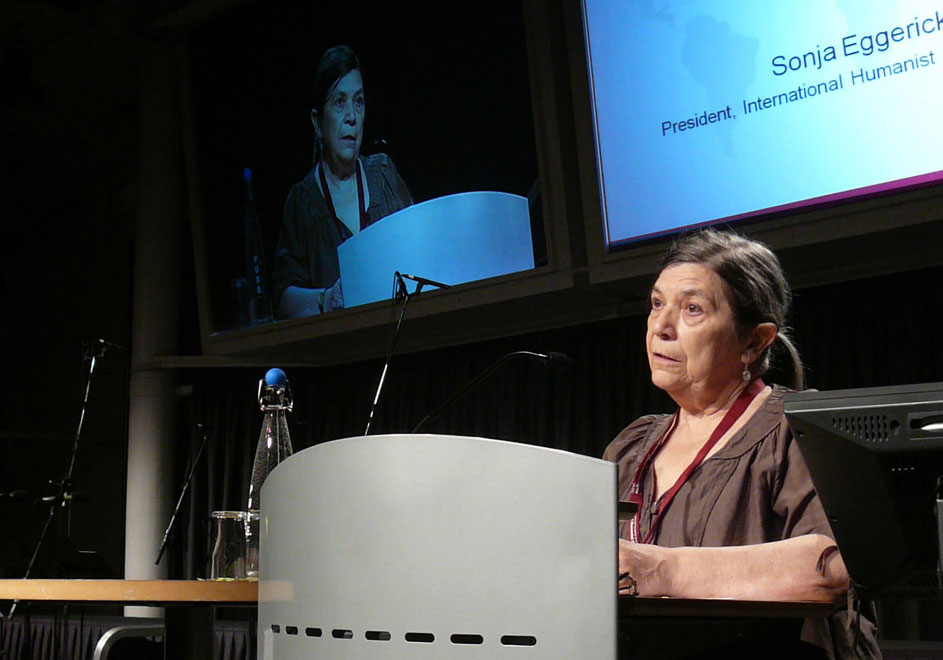
Previous IHEU President Sonja Eggerickx

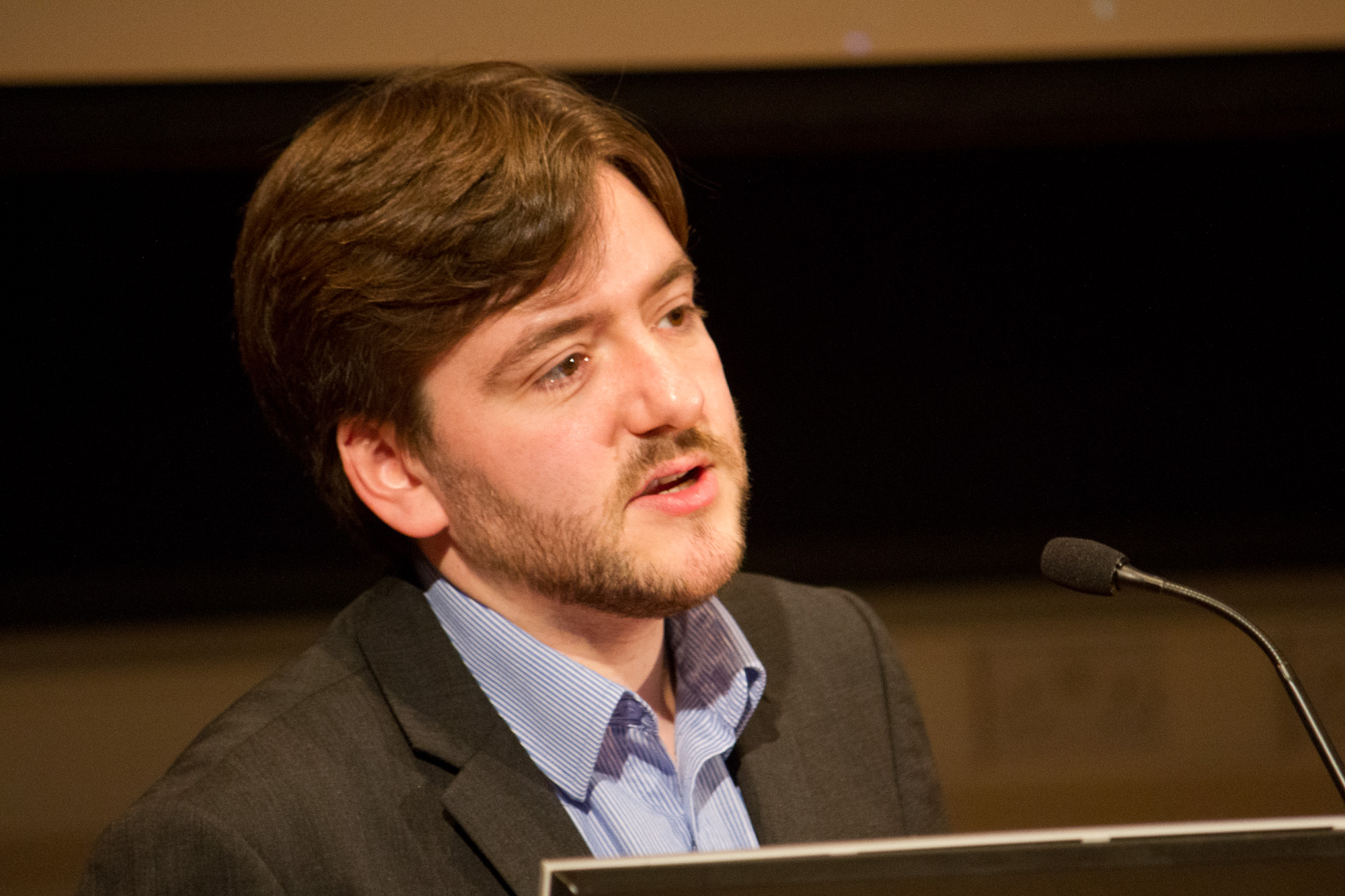
Previous IHEU President Andrew Copson

Years	Position	Holder(s)		
1952	President	Julian Huxley		
1952–1975	Chairman	Jaap van Praag		
1975–1979	Chairman troika	Piet Thones	Mihailo Marković	Howard B. Radest
1979–1985	Chairman troika	Bert Schwarz	Mihailo Marković	Howard B. Radest
1985–1986	Chairman troika	Bert Schwarz	Svetozar Stojanović	Howard B. Radest
1986–1987	Chairman troika	Rob Tielman	Svetozar Stojanović	Paul Kurtz
1987–1990	Chairman troika	Rob Tielman	Levi Fragell	Paul Kurtz
1990–1993	Chairman troika	Rob Tielman	Kari Vigeland	Paul Kurtz
1993–1994	Chairman troika	Rob Tielman	Jane Wynne Willson	Paul Kurtz
1994–1995	Chairman troika	Rob Tielman	Jane Wynne Willson	
1995–1996	Chairman troika	Rob Tielman	Jane Wynne Willson	Vern Bullough
1996–1998	President	Rob Tielman		
1998–2003	President	Levi Fragell		
2003–2006	President	Roy W Brown		
2006–2015	President	Sonja Eggerickx		
2015–2025	President	Andrew Copson		
2025–		Maggie Ardiente		

=== Awards ===
Humanists International makes a number of regular and occasional awards.

==== International Humanist Award ====
The International Humanist Award recognises outstanding achievements and contributions to the progress and defence of Humanism. The award is usually presented at the IHEU World Humanist Congress.

- 1970: Barry Commoner (United States of America), environmentalist professor
- 1974: Harold John Blackham (UK), founding member of IHEU, IHEU secretary (1952–1966)
- 1978: Vithal Mahadeo Tarkunde (India), former judge of the Bombay High Court
- 1982: Kurt Partzsch (Germany), former Minister for Social Affairs in Lower Saxony (Germany)
- 1986: Arnold Clausse (Belgium), professor emeritus of education
- 1986: The Atheist Centre (India), for pioneering social reform activities
- 1988: Andrei Sakharov (USSR), nuclear physicist, developer of the hydrogen bomb for the Soviet military, and winner of the Nobel Peace Prize
- 1990: Alexander Dubček (Czechoslovakia), leader of Czechoslovakia during the "Prague Spring" of 1968
- 1992: Pieter Admiraal (Netherlands), a Dutch anaesthetist and euthanasia advocate
- 1999: Paul Kurtz (USA), writer and founder of the Committee for Skeptical Inquiry
- 2002: Amartya Sen (India), economist, social theorist, and winner of the 1998 Nobel Memorial Prize in Economic Sciences
- 2005: Jean-Claude Pecker (France), astronomer
- 2008: Philip Pullman (UK), best-selling author of children's literature, including His Dark Materials trilogy
- 2011: Sophie in 't Veld (Netherlands), MEP and vice-chair of the European Parliament Committee on Civil Liberties, and PZ Myers (USA), biology professor at the University of Minnesota Morris and author of the Pharyngula blog
- 2014: Gulalai Ismail (Pakistan), the founder and chair of Aware Girls, and Wole Soyinka (Nigeria), Nobel Prize-winning author

==== Distinguished Service to Humanism Award ====
The Distinguished Service to Humanism Award recognises the contributions of Humanist activists to International Humanism and to organised Humanism.

- 1988: Corliss Lamont (United States of America); Indumati Parikh (India); Mathilde Krim (United States of America)
- 1990: Jean Jacques Amy (Belgium)
- 1992: Indumati Parikh (India); Vern Bullough (USA); Nettie Klein, also volunteer IHEU secretary general (1982–1996)
- 1996: Jim Herrick (UK); James Dilloway
- 1999: Abe Solomon; Paul Postma
- 2002: Phil Ward
- 2005: Barbara Smoker (UK); Marius Dées de Stério
- 2007: Keith Porteous Wood (UK)
- 2008: Roy W. Brown (UK)
- 2011: V. B. Rawat (India); Narendra Nayak (India); David Pollock (UK)
- 2012: Margaretha Jones (United States of America)
- 2013: Josh Kutchinsky (UK)
- 2014: Robbi Robson (UK)
- 2015: Hope Knutsson (Iceland)
- 2016: Sonja Eggerickx (Belgium)
- 2017: Leo Igwe (Nigeria)
- 2020: Becky Hale (USA); Bert Gasenbeek (Netherlands); Sudesh Ghoderao (India)
- 2021: Steven Pinker (USA); Bonya Rafida Ahmed (Bangladesh); Shanti Gurung (Nepal)
- 2023: Kristin Mile (Norway); Anne-France Ketelaer (France)

==== Other awards ====
Other awards include:

- 1978: Special Award for Service to World Humanism: Harold John Blackham; Jaap van Praag; Sidney Scheuer (also IHEU treasurer, 1952–1987)
- 1988: Humanist Laureate Award: Betty Friedan; Herbert Hauptman; Steve Allen
- 1988: Humanist of the Year Award: Henry Morgentaler
- 1992: Distinguished Human Rights Award: Elena Bonner
- 1996: Humanist Awards: Shulamit Aloni; Taslima Nasrin; Xiao Xuehui
- 2008: Lifetime Achievement Award: Levi Fragell (Norway)
- 2017: Distinguished Services to Anti-Superstition Award: Narendra Dabholkar (India)
- 2021: Freedom of Thought Award: Mubarak Bala (Nigeria)

== See also ==
- World Humanist Day
