= Amsterdam Declaration =

2002 statement of the fundamental principles of modern humanism

The Amsterdam Declaration 2022, also known as the Declaration of Modern Humanism, is a statement of the fundamental principles of modern Humanism. The declaration was passed unanimously by the General Assembly of Humanists International (HI) at the 70th anniversary General Assembly in Glasgow. According to HI, the declaration "is the definitive guiding principles of Modern Humanism."

The Amsterdam Declaration 2022 replaced the Amsterdam Declaration 2002, passed by the General Assembly of Humanists International at the 50th anniversary World Humanist Congress 2002. The 2002 Declaration replaced the original declaration passed at the founding congress of the International Humanist and Ethical Union in Amsterdam on 22–27 August 1952.

The Declaration is officially supported by all member organisations of HI including:

- American Humanist Association
- Association humaniste du Québec
- Council of Australian Humanist Societies
- Council for Secular Humanism
- Gay and Lesbian Humanist Association
- Humanist Canada
- Humanist Society of New Zealand
- Humanists UK
- Human-Etisk Forbund, the Norwegian Humanist Association
- Humanistic Association Netherlands (Humanistisch Verbond)
- Humanistischer Verband Deutschlands, the Humanist Association of Germany
- Humanist Association of Ireland
- Indian Humanist Union
- Sapiens Foundation, India
- Philippine Atheists and Agnostics Society (PATAS)

A complete list of signatories can be found on the HI page (see references).

The Amsterdam Declaration 2002 made exclusive use of capitalized Humanist and Humanism, which was consistent with HI's general practice and recommendations for promoting a unified Humanist identity. To further promote Humanist identity, these words are also free of any adjectives, as recommended by prominent members of HI. Such usage is not universal among HI member organizations, though most of them do observe these conventions.

== History ==
At the first World Humanist Congress in the Netherlands in 1952, Humanists International (then: International Humanist and Ethical Union, IHEU) general assembly agreed a statement of the fundamental principles of modern Humanism known as The Amsterdam Declaration. British Humanist Hector Hawton brought together the complex ideas expressed at the congress to draft the final text of the Amsterdam Declaration in clear and simple language

In 2001 and 2002, IHEU vice-president Roy W. Brown acted as project coordinator to update the original Amsterdam Declaration. At the 50th anniversary World Humanist Congress in the Netherlands in 2002, the IHEU General Assembly passed a resolution updating the declaration – "The Amsterdam Declaration 2002".

At the 70th World Humanist General Assembly in Glasgow in 2022, Humanists International passed a resolution replacing "The Amsterdam Declaration 2002" with "The Amsterdam Declaration 2022".

== See also ==
- A Secular Humanist Declaration, a similar document adopted in 1980 by the Council for Secular Humanism
- Criticism of religion
  - Anti-clericalism
  - Separation of church and state
- Ethical veganism
- Evolution in public education
- Irreligion by country
- Jewish secularism
- Marxist humanism
- Secular Buddhism
- Secular morality
- Social philosophy
- The Necessity of Atheism, a 1811 essay written by the English poet Percy Bysshe Shelley
- The Necessity of Secularism, a 2014 essay written by the Center for Inquiry president Ronald A. Lindsay
- Universal Declaration of Human Rights, a similar document adopted in 1948 by the U.N. General Assembly
- Vegetarianism and religion
