= Norwegian Humanist Association =

Organization

- Human-Etisk Forbund
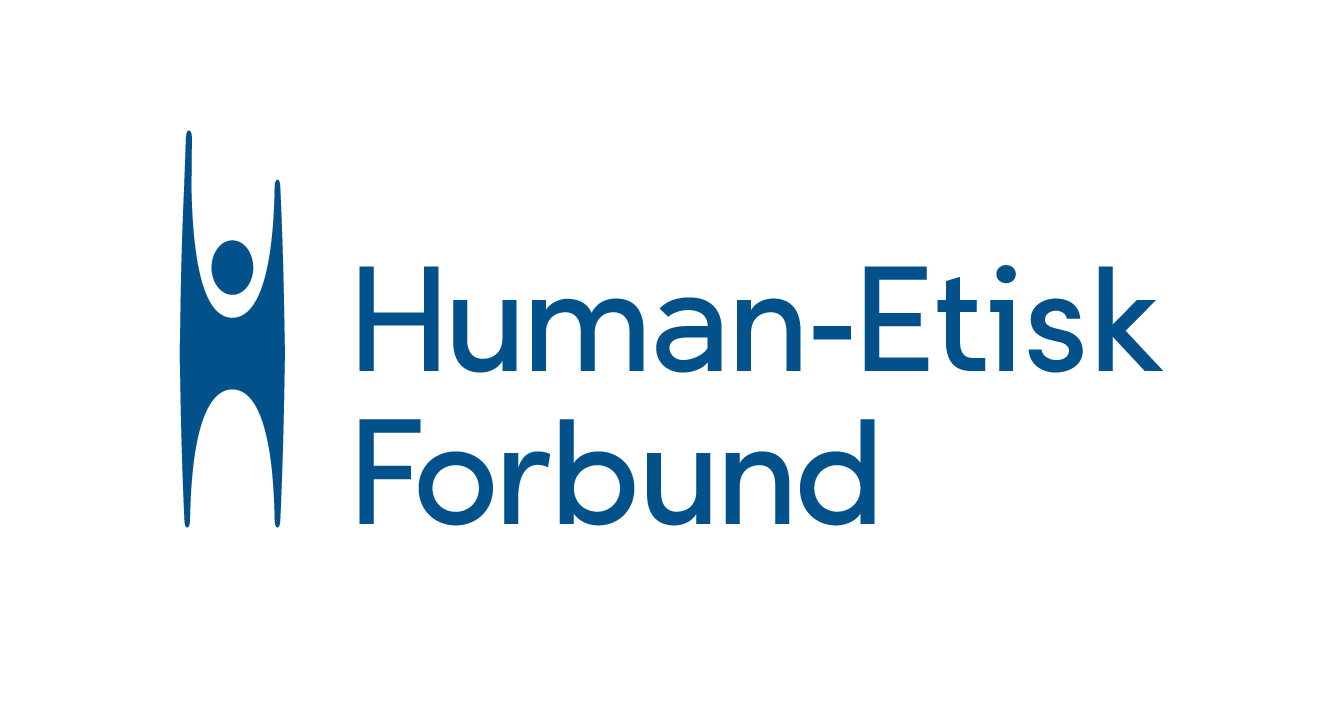
- Abbreviation: HEF
- Formation: 9 April 1956; 70 years ago
- Region served: mainly Norway
- Members: 150,000 (2024)
- President: Christian Lomsdalen
- Website: human.no

The Norwegian Humanist Association (Norwegian: Human-Etisk Forbund; HEF) is one of the largest secular humanist associations in the world, with over 130,000 members. Those members constitute 2.3% of the national population of 5.47 million, making HEF by far the largest such association in the world in proportion to population. The association publishes the magazine Fri tanke (Free Thought).

== History and activities ==
Founded in 1956, the HEF is a member of the Humanists International (HI). The Norwegian Humanist Association is an organisation for people who base their ethics on human, not religious values. Most of its members are agnostics or atheists. HEF supports the following statement of the IHEU:

Humanism is a democratic, non-theistic and ethical life stance which affirms that human beings have the right and responsibility to give meaning and shape to their lives and therefore reject supernatural views of reality.

Former HEF secretary general, Levi Fragell, was president of the IHEU (1988–2003) and later Chair of IHEU's Committee for Growth and Development. Since September 2021, Christian Lomsdalen is chairman of the Board of the organization.

According to its bylaws, the organization works to ensure access to humanist ceremonies and spreading knowledge of humanism. The organization previously also worked for a separation of church and state (the Evangelical-Lutheran Church of Norway was the state church of Norway until 2012). A civil confirmation organized by HEF has gained popularity among the Norwegian young during recent years. About 19 percent of Norwegian 15-year-olds were in 2018 taking part in HEF's civil or humanist confirmation, whereas 56% took part in the ceremonies of "state church", with the ceremonies of HEF increasing in popularity while the opposite happens to the church ceremonies. Locally the percentage of humanist youth ceremonies have been significantly higher and also significantly lower in the churches.

On July 9, 2006, a prominent member of the Norwegian Humanist Association, Jens Brun-Pedersen, called for prime minister Jens Stoltenberg to advocate the separation of church and state. He argued that the second article of the constitution of Norway which defines the "Evangelical-Lutheran Religion" as "the official religion of the State" and the 12th article of the constitution which requires half of the ministers of the cabinet to be members of the state church is discriminatory, and that Norway cannot criticise countries advocating sharia law when the constitution favours Lutheran members of society.

The Norwegian Humanist Association hosted the 18th World Humanist Congress of the IHEU. The Congress was held at the Oslo Congress Center in Oslo, Norway, on the 12–14 August 2011. The theme was Humanism and Peace. HEF also hosted the 3rd in 1962 and the 9th in 1986.

Although raising public awareness of scepticism is not a primary goal of the Norwegian Humanist Association, an online campaign was organized in 2011 called Ingen liker å bli lurt (No one likes to be fooled), which led to media debate of the issues. The campaign was kicked off by three appearances in Norway by James Randi, a Canadian-American retired stage magician and a scientific skeptic who has extensively challenged paranormal and pseudo scientific claims.

A youth wing of the HEF, Norwegian Humanist Youth (Humanistisk Ungdom), was founded in August 2007. The current president of the board is Sina Inngjerdingen.

== See also ==
- Norwegian Heathen Society
