= Killing of disabled children in Uganda =

In some parts of Uganda, disabled children are put to death. In traditional rituals, infant body parts are claimed to bring benefits. Those who continue these practices describe it as "mercy killing", meaning that the children are spared from enduring painful disabilities.

== Rituals ==
=== Process ===
Most of the time, a witch doctor will resort to these rituals to save the disabled children from their painful disability after the failure of multiple attempts using other methods that include herbal remedies or animal sacrifices which are less powerful. During the rituals of child sacrifice, the witch doctor is in presence of his accomplices and starts by verifying any evidence of demonization in the child. Then, he removes different parts of the child's body by force and uses the blood to make a potion mixed with herbs. These body parts are mostly heads, genitals, eyes, tongues, limbs, teeth, and organs. According to the perpetrators, these rituals are necessary to bring about success, healing or wealth.

=== Practitioners ===
The killing of disabled children in Uganda is perpetrated by witchdoctors who praise the power of these rituals to their clients in search of wealth, health or fame. Those witchdoctors are often compared to traditional healers which have resulted in the propaganda stating that witchcraft is associated with the healing practices of the indigenous culture although they are, in reality, responsible of horrible crimes unlike traditional healers who do not use human organs. The parents of disabled children also play a major role in the rituals by allowing it and leading their children to death because they believe that the so-called 'mercy killing' would avoid them the pain of enduring these disabilities.

== Investigations ==
In 2018, Members of the European Parliament strongly condemned the "mercy" killing of disabled children in Uganda.

=== Findings ===
The European Parliament was involved in finding resolutions for the killings of disabled people in Uganda. They strongly condemned "the unjustifiable and inhumane killing of children and new-borns with disabilities", saying that "human dignity is inviolable and must be respected and protected at all times" and that "everyone has the right to life, regardless of their abilities and disabilities". People with disabilities are often excluded from community activities. Disabled children are usually hidden from the public, cast out, and even killed. Mothers of these children experience isolation from their extended families, while most of the fathers neglect their families. The Ugandan National Household Survey reports only record disabled people of age 5 and above, leaving out most children. 7.1% of Ugandans, which is equivalent to 2.1 million people, are reported to be disabled.

=== Actions and penalties ===
In Uganda, the law prohibits discrimination against persons with physical, sensory, intellectual, or mental disabilities in employment, education, air travel and other transportation, access to health care, and the provision of other state services. However, the government's efforts in enforcing these laws have not been effective.

The form of treatment given to people with disability has not been encouraging of late. A report released in 2012 by the National Council on Disability (NCD) indicated 55 percent of persons with disabilities lacked functional literacy skills, and only 33 percent studied to primary grade seven. The report found some children with mental disabilities were sometimes denied food and were tied to trees and beds with ropes in order to control their movements. The report further stated the needs of children with autism and learning difficulties were ignored due to an insufficient number of special needs schools.

Government agencies responsible for protecting the rights of persons with disabilities included the Ministry of State for Disabled Persons, the NCD, and the Ministry of Gender, Labor, and Social Development, but these entities lacked sufficient funding to undertake any significant initiatives.

In the government's effort to ensure that there is adequate representation of people with disability in roles of position, there are 5 seats in parliament which have been reserved for persons with disabilities. This initiative is intended to empower a historically marginalized group.

== See also ==
- Child sacrifice in Uganda
- Witchcraft accusations against children in Africa
