= Leo Igwe =

Nigerian human rights activist (born 1970)

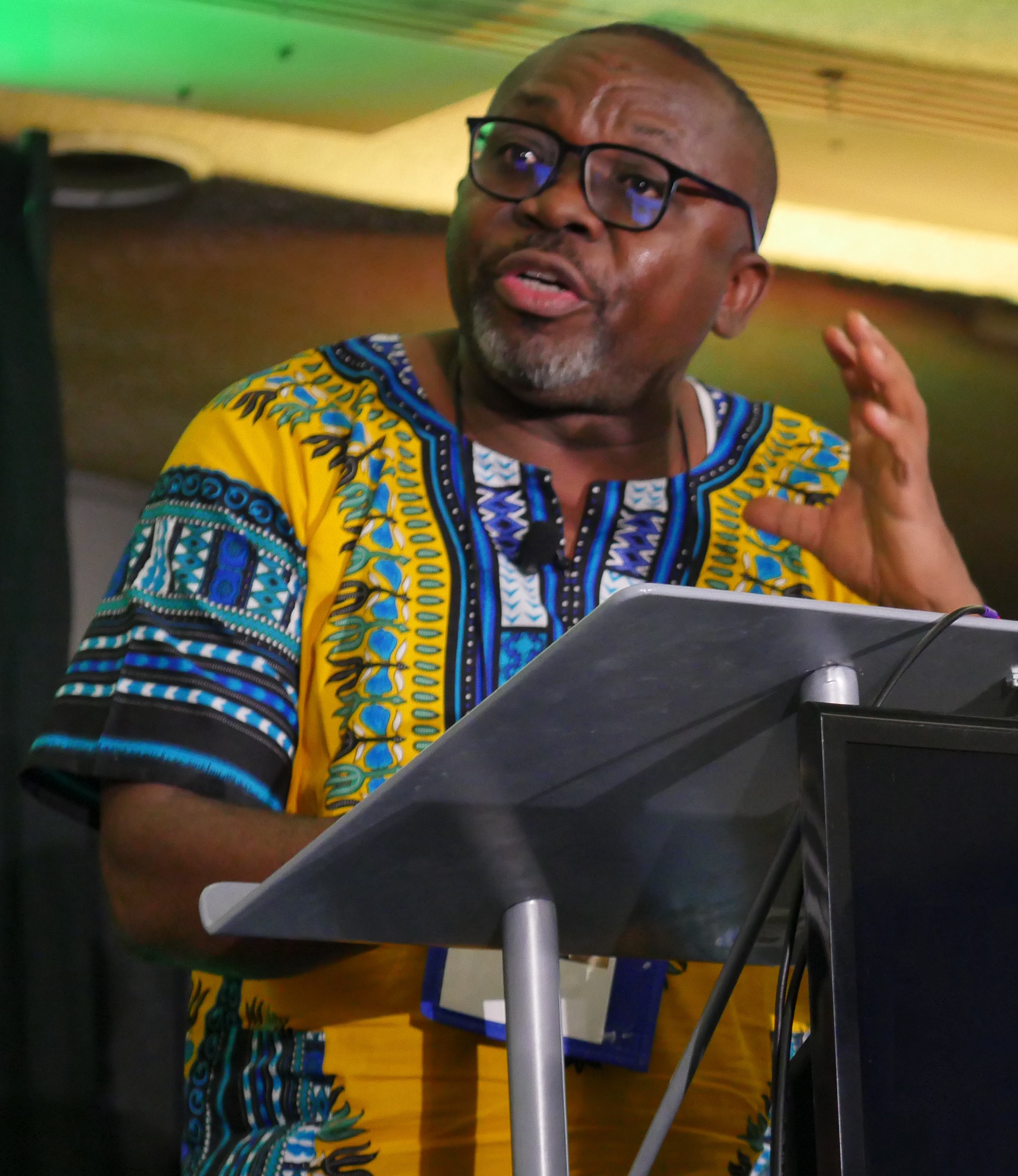
- Igwe in 2026
- Born: 26 July 1970 (age 56); Nigeria
- Education: University of Bayreuth, University of Calabar
- Known for: Human rights advocacy, skepticism
- Leo Igwe's voice Recorded September 2017
- Website: ieet.org/index.php/IEET/bio/igwe

Leo Igwe (born 26 July 1970) is a Nigerian human rights advocate and secular humanist. A campaigner both in Nigeria and internationally as part of Humanists International, he specializes in documenting the impacts of child witchcraft accusations in Africa and in combating discrimination against atheists. He holds a Ph.D. from the Bayreuth International School of African Studies in Germany and a graduate degree in philosophy from the University of Calabar in Nigeria.

Igwe's human rights advocacy has brought him into conflict with high-profile witchcraft believers, such as Liberty Foundation Gospel Ministries, because of his criticism of what he describes as their role in the violence and child abandonment that sometimes result from accusations of witchcraft. Igwe's fieldwork has led to his arrest on several occasions in Nigeria.

Influenced by the writings of Paul Kurtz, Igwe is a champion of humanist values, and in particular, the importance of rationalism, scientific skepticism, secular ethics, and human rights-centred liberal democracy. He has held leadership roles in the Nigerian Humanist Movement, Humanists International, Atheist Alliance International, and the Center For Inquiry–Nigeria.

== Early life ==
Igwe was raised in southeastern Nigeria, and describes his household as being strictly Catholic in the midst of a "highly superstitious community," according to an interview in the Gold Coast Bulletin. At age twelve, Igwe entered the seminary and began to study for the Catholic priesthood. "In the seminary," he said in a subsequent interview with the European Skeptics Podcast, "they promote their Christian Catholic beliefs and these beliefs question the traditional beliefs." This "odd blend of tribalism and fundamentalist Christianity" led to a period of research and internal conflict. "[W]hen I started questioning, I found out that whether it's Christianity or traditional magic, it's all about superstition, it's all about hearsay, it's all about people making things up. It's all about people peddling beliefs without evidence." At the age of 24, Igwe resigned from the seminary and relocated to Ibadan.

== Human rights activism ==
Igwe was influenced to become a humanist activist through the writings of Paul Kurtz, which he read in magazines published by the Center for Inquiry.

Igwe is listed as a Junior Fellow for the Bayreuth International Graduate School of African Studies, where his project is a case study of witchcraft accusation in northern Ghana.

In a fall 2000 article in the quarterly journal Free Inquiry, Igwe enumerated different ways in which religious extremists in Nigeria have co-opted the local government and used it to enforce religious codes of law, hindering the upholding of human rights in those areas.

Igwe wrote in 2004 that in his own country of Nigeria, contemporary belief in witchcraft leads to ritual killing and human sacrifice, noting that women and children are more likely to be said to possess or practice "negative" witchcraft abilities, while men are more often depicted as possessing benign witchcraft abilities.

In 2008, a BBC documentary, Saving Africa's Witch Children, featured an appearance by Igwe, as one of the primary subjects was "witch hunter Helen Ukpabio." The documentary detailed reported "terrible crimes committed against children accused of witchcraft," and premiered as an HBO feature in 2010. The film also follows the efforts of Sam Itauma, a human rights activist and founder of the Child Rights and Rehabilitation Network (CRARN), who offers shelter and protection to children who have been abused or abandoned, and Gary Foxcroft, who founded Stepping Stones Nigeria, a UK-registered charity.

In 2009, Igwe represented the International Humanist and Ethical Union at the African Commission on Human and Peoples' Rights in Banjul, Gambia, where he spoke out on the IHEU's behalf against caste-based discrimination in Africa. In his talk, Igwe brought attention to discrimination against the Osu, a group of people perceived by some to be of lower class, who Igwe says "continue to suffer discrimination and indignity, particularly in the areas of marriage and family, right to own property and inheritance, access to land, political rights and representation, education, development, infrastructure, and distribution of basic amenities."

In 2010, according to a release by the European Humanist Federation (EHF), Igwe's home was invaded by soldiers and police officers "following a fictitious murder charge," which was allegedly brought on by a man that Igwe had attempted to have prosecuted for allegedly committing sexual crimes against a 10-year-old girl in 2006. According to the report, Igwe had been arrested three times since beginning work on the rape case, as a result of allegedly malicious petitions, prompting David Pollock of the EHF to write to then vice-president of Nigeria, Goodluck Jonathan, on Igwe's behalf.

According to the EHF, later in August 2010, Igwe's home and family were attacked when two unidentified men assaulted and blindfolded Igwe's father, causing "extensive injuries to his face and head", and resulting in the elder Igwe having to have his eye surgically removed. The case has been taken up by Amnesty International after police reportedly refused to open an investigation.

On 11 January 2011, while attempting to rescue two children who were victims of witchcraft accusation in Uyo Akwa State in southern Nigeria, Igwe was "imprisoned and beaten by police," in an effort, according to Sahara Reporters, by the state governor Godswill Akpabio, to begin "clamping down on activists involved in the rescue of children accused of witchcraft." Igwe was later released without charge, according to Gary Foxcroft of Stepping Stones Nigeria, and "in good spirits".

On 11 February 2014, Igwe was chosen as a laureate of the International Academy of Humanism. In 2017, he was given the Distinguished Services to Humanism Award from the International Humanist and Ethical Union General Assembly. Upon receiving the award, Igwe dedicated it "to all humanists at risk around the globe".

Igwe is an outspoken supporter of the Campaign for the Establishment of a United Nations Parliamentary Assembly, an organisation which campaigns for democratic reformation of the United Nations. When discussing the matter, Igwe has argued that "the United Nations needs to be handed back to those to whom it actually belongs—the people of the world."

Igwe continues to speak out against attacks on alleged witches in Malawi. According to him, recent cases of such attacks in December 2019 and January 2020 "...contained seeds of an effective advocacy against witch persecution in Malawi. First of all there is an urgent need for advocates for alleged witches throughout the country to become more visible and proactive." He proposes that, in addition to widespread education about the real causes of misfortune, "There should be heavy penalties including suspension and summary dismissal for the head of any village, or district where an alleged witch is attacked or killed."

=== Liberty Gospel Church ===
Igwe's activism against witchcraft accusations has included lobbying for the enforcement of a law in Nigeria that prohibits accusing children of witchcraft, which has led to conflict with Pentecostal group Liberty Foundation Gospel Ministries and in particular Pastor Helen Ukpabio, who has been criticized by Igwe and others, according to a New York Times article, for her teachings "having contributed to the torture or abandonment of thousands of Nigerian children—including infants and toddlers—suspected of being witches and warlocks."

On 29 July 2009, Igwe was scheduled to speak at a meeting in Calabar, Nigeria, "condemning the abandonment, torture and killing of children alleged to be witches." As he was about to deliver his talk, members of the Liberty Gospel Church, more than 150 people, invaded the meeting and attacked Igwe, who was "beaten and robbed, relieved of his camera, money and mobile phone before managing to escape to a nearby police station to seek help." Portions of the altercation were captured on film.

After the attack, the leader of Liberty Gospel Church, pastor Helen Ukpabio, sued the state government, as well as several critics, including Igwe, seeking 2 billion naira (about US$13 million, 2010) and an "order of perpetual injunction," restraining her critics' speech from further criticizing her work. Ukpabio's application was later dismissed by Justice P.J. Nneke at the Federal High Court in Calabar.

Responding to criticism by Igwe and other activists, Ukpabio told The New York Times reporter Mark Oppenheimer that "her filmic depictions of possessed children, gathering by moonlight to devour human flesh" (as seen in her film End of the Wicked) were not meant to be taken literally, and stated, according to Oppenheimer, that the BBC documentary Saving Africa's Children "exaggerates or invents the problem of child abandonment." According to Oppenheimer, "Asked how she could be so sure, she said, 'because I am an African!' In Africa, she said, 'family ties are too strong to have a child on the street.'"

== Skepticism ==
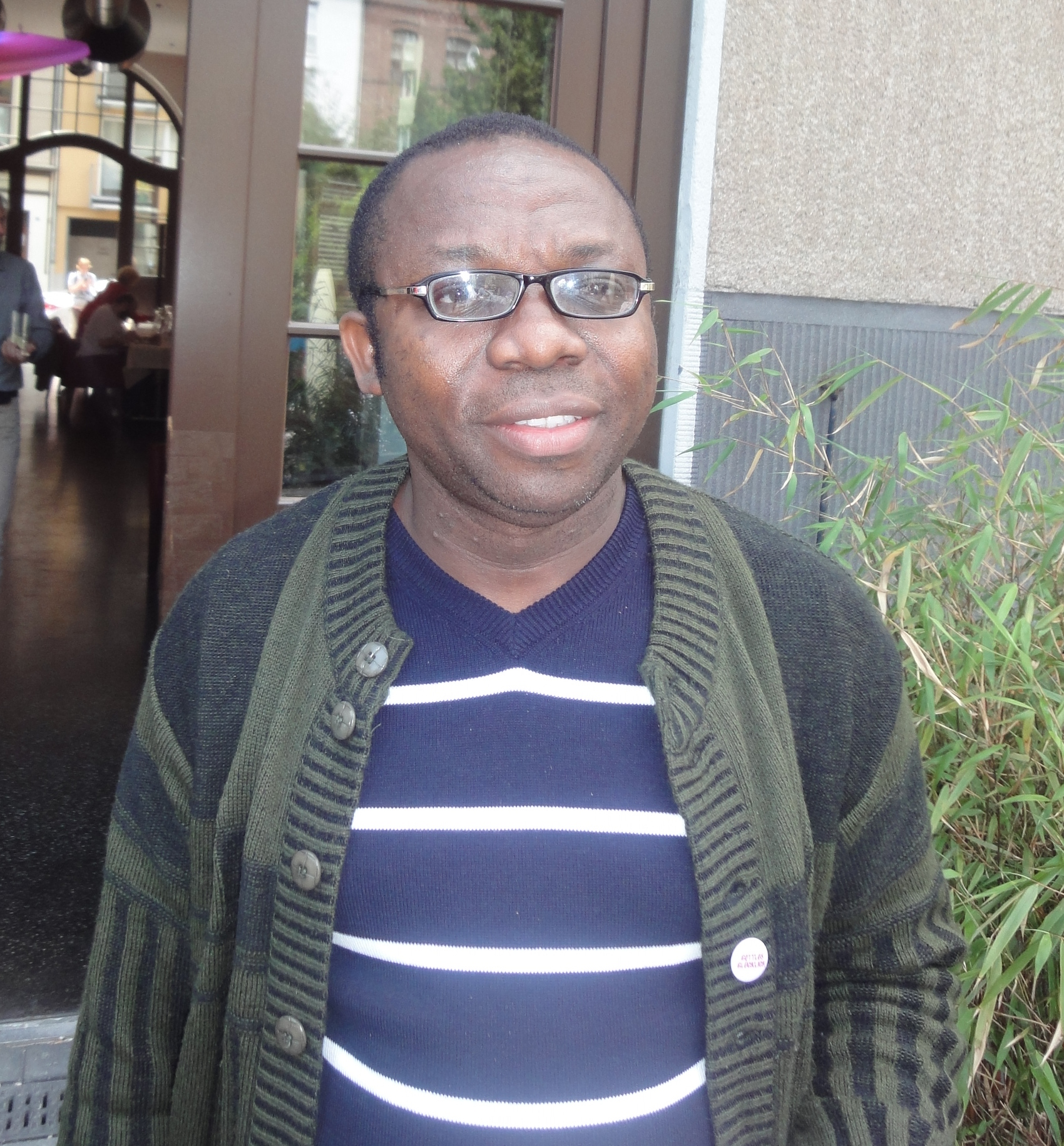
Leo Igwe

Igwe's role as coordinator of the Nigerian Humanist Movement has led to his being awarded the Freidenker's Award for an outstanding contribution to world atheism during the 2005 Stars of Freethought Convention, hosted by Atheist Alliance International and Atheists United. In addition to founding the Nigerian Humanist Movement, Igwe was also a main organizer and presenter in 2007 at the first international humanist conference in Sub-Saharan Africa.

Igwe has also served on the board of directors of Atheist Alliance International, where he facilitated collaboration between AAI and the Nigerian Humanist Movement, resulting in the NHM receiving both the AAI International Freidenker Award and the AAI Community Cooperation Award.

In June 2009, as director of the Center For Inquiry–Nigeria, Igwe was interviewed on the BBC World Service about the center's efforts to raise awareness about violence and neglect resulting from witchcraft belief, both in the name of its practice and resulting from fear of magic.

In 2012, Igwe wrote A Manifesto for a Skeptical Africa, which received endorsements from multiple public activists in Africa, as well as skeptical endorsers around the world.

Igwe presented a poster at the Sixth World Skeptics Congress (18–20 May 2012) in Berlin, Germany, with graphic accounts of the trials that he and many of his supporters have faced in Africa while protesting the persecution and killing of children and minorities, and the failures on the part of law enforcement and religious leaders to challenge such atrocities.

On 12 July 2012, Igwe participated in a panel discussion at The Amaz!ng Meeting (TAM), "From Witch-burning to God-men: Supporting Skepticism Around the World." Igwe's presentation addressed the issue of poverty driving both the supply of and demand for self-styled exorcists, which preys on desperate communities and results in the abandonment or neglect of children. With panelist Eran Segev (then-President, Australian Skeptics) and moderator Brian Thompson (Outreach Director, JREF), Igwe discussed his efforts in human rights advocacy and the deleterious effects of superstition and witchcraft accusation in Nigeria, Ghana, and Malawi.

In October 2012, Igwe was appointed as a research fellow of the James Randi Educational Foundation (JREF), a skeptical nonprofit organization founded by magician and skeptic James Randi. Randi said of the appointment, "We at the JREF are proud to work with Mr. Leo Igwe in fighting deadly misinformation in Africa, and around the world," adding that the JREF's mission "fits in perfectly with Mr. Igwe's very important work."

In 2013, Igwe presented a speech at the London Black Atheists meeting entitled 'Breaking The Taboo of Atheism in Black Communities', in which he said "God has not turned up! Black people should speak out because we suffer most from religious excesses".

In 2017, Igwe attended the seventeenth European Skeptics Congress (ESC). Here, he spoke on the topics of science and religion. He attended a panel discussion with Petr Jan Vinš, a priest from the Old Catholic Church, who spoke about bringing more critical thinking to religion. Igwe was "sternly polite with his comments about not talking down to religious people and embracing science."

In a 2017 Ted Talk on humanism, Igwe shared how the example of his parents' hard work inspired him to adopt a philosophy that emphasizes human agency in his approach to challenges like poverty, disease, and superstition. "In some cases, religion drives many Africans to extraordinary length: to attack other human beings, to commit ritual killing, targeting those living with albinism, those with a humpback, and as I recently learned, those with a bald head. In Africa, superstition is widespread, with so many people believing in witchcraft, something that has no basis in reason or in science. Yet alleged witches, usually women, children and elderly persons are still routinely attacked, banished and killed. And I've made it part of my life's mission to end witchcraft accusation and witch persecution in Africa."

=== Witchcraft tests ===
At the JREF's The Amaz!ng Meeting (TAM) in July 2013, Igwe spoke on a panel on "Supporting Skepticism Around the World." While attending the conference, Igwe gave an interview to Christopher Brown from the Meet the Skeptics podcast, during which Igwe provided a description of three tests used to determine whether a person is "guilty" of practicing witchcraft. Each of the three tests are heavily biased against the accused and include the use of the randomness of nature (chickens or crocodiles) or the laws of physics (brooms).

The chicken test involves the candidate providing a few chickens to a diviner. The diviner ceremoniously beheads the chickens and watches how the decapitated animals fall. If the chickens land facing the sky, the suspect is innocent; but if they fall facing the ground, the accused is guilty.

The crocodile test is a simple one in which the accused is thrown into a river in which crocodiles are known to live. The suspect is guilty if attacked and eaten. This test is supposedly no longer in use. Igwe suspects that this may be due to over-hunting of crocodiles in the locations where the tests were performed.

The broom test uses the laws of physics to put the accused at a distinct disadvantage. The suspect is seated upon a small seat which provides very little support or balance. After some ritual actions, the bristle ends of two brooms are pushed against the front of the suspect's neck. If the brooms separate, or rather if the potential witch is able to remain upright, then the suspect is innocent. If the brooms do not separate and the accused is pushed from the seat, the suspect is guilty.

=== iDoubt ===
Igwe described a method of critical thinking in an article for Committee for Skeptical Inquiry that he calls "iDoubt". iDoubt is a way to categorize and scrutinize information before accepting it as fact. Igwe labels the five doubts as "individual doubt, inspire doubt, inculcate doubt, inform doubt, and Internet doubt."

"Individual doubt" labels one's personal questions based upon one's experience with a given subject. "Inspire doubt" refers to commending those who employ critical thinking and express doubts instead of freely accepting information as factual. "Inculcate doubt" highlights that while many people doubt naturally, critical thinking needs to be taught, preferably from a young age. "Inform doubt" identifies the need to express our critical thoughts in order to circulate them and encourage others to do the same. Finally, "Internet doubt" displays a way to prompt further critical thinking by posing questions and receiving more questions in response.

=== Critical thinking workshops ===
Igwe has created teaching aids for teachers and primary school pupils on the topic of critical thinking. On 23 June 2021, he held his first workshop at Funmade Nursery and Primary School in Oyo State, southwest Nigeria. On 1 July, he presented the case for critical thinking in primary schools to fifty teachers in the Ibadan local government area of Nigeria. This was the first teacher training on critical thinking for primary schools in the state.

According to Igwe, the African school system needs a paradigm shift and a radical change in the culture of teaching and learning for pupils. The teaching of critical thinking, he said, is intended to stimulate this change and spark an intellectual awakening and renaissance in schools.

== Ex-cellence Project ==
In 2022, Igwe founded an initiative that provides social and psychological support to non-religious former clergy in Africa. Named Ex-cellence Project, it is intended to correct misconceptions about leaving religion and resigning from clerical work, help individuals lead happy and meaningful lives outside of religion and clericalism, and provide a refuge for those who are physically and psychologically abused. The project aims to offer counselling and therapeutic programmes as well as a sense of community and belonging to members, regardless of their religious or clerical background.

== Honours ==
Igwe was appointed as a research fellow of the James Randi Educational Foundation, where he continues working toward the goal of responding to the deleterious effects of superstition, advancing skepticism throughout Africa and around the world. In 2014, he was chosen as a laureate of the International Academy of Humanism, and in 2017, he received the Distinguished Services to Humanism Award from the International Humanist and Ethical Union.

In 2021, he won the Heart of Humanism Award, an award that recognizes individuals who exemplifies great humanist values.

== See also ==
- African Commission on Human and Peoples' Rights
- Atheist Alliance International
- Center for Inquiry
- Child Rights and Rehabilitation Network
- International Academy of Humanism
- International Humanist and Ethical Union
- James Randi Educational Foundation
