= Effacer le tableau =

2002–2003 genocide of Bambuti pygmies

- Part of the Second Congo War and Violence against pygmies and the Ituri conflict
- Map of Ituri Province within the DRC.
- Location: Mambasa and the Ituri rainforest, Democratic Republic of the Congo
- Date: October 2002 to January 2003
- Attack type: Genocidal massacre, Ethnic cleansing, cannibalism, war rape
- Deaths: 60,000 to 70,000 (40% of the Eastern Congo's Pygmy population killed) (Note: Eastern Pygmy population was reduced to 90,000 after a campaign that killed 60,000 implying a 40% decline)
- Victim: Bambuti pygmies
- Perpetrators: Movement for the Liberation of the Congo (Jean-Pierre Bemba); Rally for Congolese Democracy
- Motive: Territorial conquest of the North Kivu province of the DRC

Effacer le tableau (French pronunciation: [efɑse lə tablo], lit. 'erase the board' or 'clean the slate') was a military operation carried out during the Second Congo War by the Movement for the Liberation of the Congo and Rally for Congolese Democracy-National between October 2002 and January 2003 against the government-aligned Rally for Congolese Democracy-Movement for Liberation. The goal of the operation was to capture the town of Mambasa, Ituri District, along with the areas to the south and southeast, ultimately aiming to seize the city of Beni in North Kivu.

Using terror as a weapon of war, the operation included serious human rights violations, including arbitrary executions, rape, torture, and forced disappearances. While the campaign affected the civilian population as a whole, it specifically targeted the Bambuti pygmies for mass killing and the severe deprivation of other fundamental rights, which may "support a possible prosecution for genocide", according to the Minority Rights Group International. Summary executions also targeted members of the Nande people.

== Background ==
In 2002, Mambasa was a town of about "20,000 to 25,000 inhabitants." A Congolese town near the borders of Uganda and South Sudan, it lies in the eastern part of Ituri, which Human Rights Watch described in 2003 as "the bloodiest corner" of the DRC.

The extermination was carried out by soldiers from the Movement for the Liberation of the Congo (MLC), who became known to locals as les effaceurs ("the erasers") and led by President Jean-Pierre Bemba, and troops from the Rally for Congolese Democracy (RCD-N), led by Roger Lumbala.

== Massacre ==
The primary objective of Effacer le tableau was the territorial conquest of the North Kivu province of the DRC and ethnic cleansing of Pygmies from the Congo's eastern region whose population numbered 90,000 by 2002. The Bambuti were targeted specifically as the rebels considered them "subhuman", and it was believed by the rebels that the flesh of the Bambuti held "magical powers". Senior officers justified these beliefs with Bible passages (such as Deuteronomy 20:13–20:17).

=== Timeline ===
There were three separate military operations in Mambasa:

- On October 12, MLC/RCD-N forces captured Mambasa and subjected it to looting, mass rape, destruction, and violence. The commander of the operation was Colonel Freddy Ngalimu.
- At the end of October, RCD-ML troops counterattacked and recaptured Mambasa.
- In November and December, the MLC/RCD-N recaptured Mambasa under the command of Colonel Widdy Ramses Masamba.

Commanders Ngalimu and Masamba both reported to General Constant Ndima Kongba, according to the UN-mandated mission. The latter officer is nicknamed "Effacer le tableau" and was part of a group bearing the same name. However, the MLC claimed in 2021 that Constant Ndima did not take part in these operations.

There were reports of cannibalism being widespread. It is estimated 60,000 to 70,000 Pygmies were killed in the campaign, and over 100,000 more were displaced. Investigations found that beyond the effaceurs, attacks on and the killing of the Bambuti became common among all forces during the Second Congo War.

== Aftermath ==
In March 2016, the International Criminal Court found Jean-Pierre Bemba guilty of war crimes and crimes against humanity in the Central African Republic. Bemba was the vice president of the DRC, and leader of the MLC during the year-long extermination campaign. He was fully acquitted by the ICC's appeal court in June 2018.

== See also ==
- Bibliography of genocide studies
- List of incidents of cannibalism
- Outline of genocide studies

== Bibliography ==
- Congo, Réseau des Associations Autochtones Pygmées du (2004-07-06). 'Erasing the Board' Report of the international research mission into crimes under international law committed against the Bambuti Pygmies in the eastern Democratic Republic of Congo. London: Minority Rights Group. ISBN 978-1-904584-21-6.
- Annan, Kofi A. (25 June 2003). Letter dated 25 June 2003 from the Secretary-General addressed to the President of the Security Council (Report). United Nations Digital Library. Archived from the original on 31 December 2023.
- Gilbert, Jérémie (2016). Nomadic Peoples and Human Rights (1st ed.). Routledge. p. 43. ISBN 978-1138666498.
- Lattimer, Mark (21 March 2016). "Bemba guilty verdict upholds doctrine of command responsibility". Minority Rights Group International. Archived from the original on 29 February 2024.
- Penketh, Anne (6 July 2004). "Extermination of the pygmies". The Independent. Archived from the original on 6 April 2024.
- Deibert, Michael (12 September 2013). The Democratic Republic of Congo: Between Hope and Despair. Zed Books. ISBN 978-1-78032-348-0.
