= Irreligion in Africa =

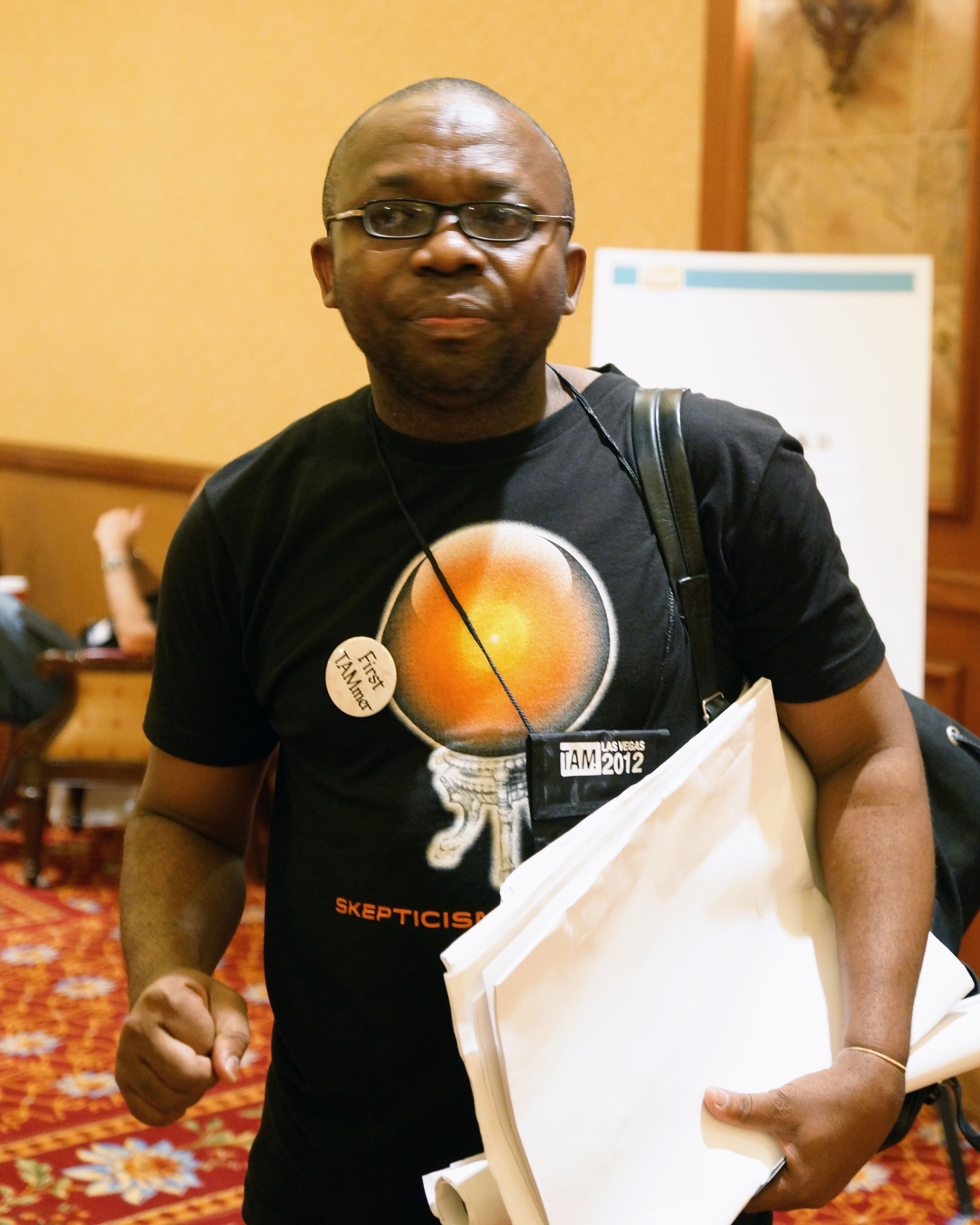
- Prominent Nigerian atheist Leo Igwe

Religion
- Irreligion (including atheism, physicalism, metaphysical naturalism, metaphysical logicism (logicalism), agnosticism, deism, skepticism, freethought/freethinker, secular humanism, ignosticism, nonbeliever, non-theist, rationalist)

Irreligion in Africa, also encompassing atheism in Africa as well as agnosticism, secular humanism and general secularism, has been estimated at over tens of millions in various polls. While the predominant religions in Africa are Islam and Christianity, many groups and individuals still practice their traditional beliefs. Despite this, the irreligious population is notable, especially in South Africa where 3.1% of the population describe themselves as irreligious, atheist or agnostic, and in Botswana, where 7.1% of the population describes themselves as non-religious.

== History ==
Sources promoting irreligion in Africa have been dated to go back several millennia. Other sources have noted that many African philosophies such as Ubuntu are rooted in a secular humanistic framework. During the 1950s and 1960s, irreligion in Africa became increasingly widespread among the educated classes as communism, socialism and anti-colonial movements gained influence on the continent.

== Demographics ==
The largest self-declared populations of the irreligious in Africa are found in Southern African countries such as South Africa, Mozambique, and Botswana. Irreligion in Ghana has also been the subject of some study. There may be claims that irreligious people are also growing in North Africa, in particular, ex-Muslims, however there is no credible study to back this narrative up.

== Trends ==
In tandem with the increase of irreligion around the world, the declared population of irreligionists in Africa has been noted to be on the rise.

== Notable irreligious people in Africa ==
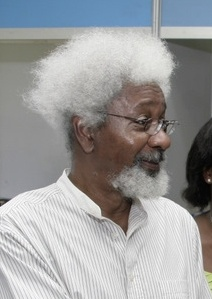
Wole Soyinka, Nigerian writer and winner of the 1986 Nobel Prize in Literature

=== Algeria ===
- Rachid Boudjedra, Algerian writer and novelist.
- Kateb Yacine, Algerian novelist and playwright.

=== Egypt ===
- Kareem Amer, Egyptian blogger and political activist.
- Aliaa Magda Elmahdy, Egyptian feminist.
- Sherif Gaber, Egyptian political activist and blogger.
- Maikel Nabil Sanad, Egyptian blogger and political activist.

=== Kenya ===
- Barack Obama Sr., Kenyan economist and father of U.S. President Barack Obama.

=== Morocco ===
- Zineb El Rhazoui, Moroccan journalist and human rights activist.

=== Mozambique ===
- Samora Machel, socialist leader and President of Mozambique.

=== Nigeria ===
- Leo Igwe, Nigerian human rights activist.
- Seun Kuti, Nigerian musician.
- Tai Solarin, Nigerian writer and educator.
- Wole Soyinka, Nigerian writer and Nobel Prize winner.

=== Tanzania ===
- Kingunge Ngombale–Mwiru, veteran Tanzanian politician.

=== South Africa ===
- Zackie Achmat, South African anti-apartheid activist.
- Nadine Gordimer, ANC activist and writer.
- Chris Hani, South African anti-apartheid activist and General Secretary of the South African Communist Party.
- Govan Mbeki, South African anti-apartheid activist and father of President of South Africa Thabo Mbeki.
- Ronnie Kasrils, South African anti-apartheid activist.
- Joe Slovo, South African anti-apartheid activist and General Secretary of the South African Communist Party.

== See also ==
- Religion in Africa
- Atheism in the African diaspora
