= Dennis V. Razis =

Greek oncologist (1923–2017)

Dennis Vincent Razis (30 May 1923 – 1 September 2017) was a Greek oncologist and academic. He was considered to be the first practitioner of formal oncology in modern Greece. Razis was also the President of the Delphi Society, an interdisciplinary assembly of philosophers and scientists concerned with the social and ecological crises that threatens life on earth.

== Background ==
Dennis Razis was born in Argostoli, Kefallonia, Greece, the last of seven children to a middle-class family engaged in trade and agriculture. His father was a merchant and landowner. Before the Second World War, Kefallonia had a rich cultural heritage with distinct music and popular interest in theatre and opera, which the whole family attended regularly. However he was expected to work in his father’s store while he attended school. He finished high school in 1941, at the time of the Italian occupation. He and his older siblings were involved in the popular resistance.

Razis studied medicine in the University of Athens, graduating in 1948. This was a difficult period for Greece, when occupation and economic collapse were followed, after the war, by protracted and vicious civil war. This period left an indelible mark on the young medical student who still remembers that on the black market a single injection of Penicillin cost one gold sovereign, an enormous sum at the time.

Immediately after graduation he was drafted in the army and served for 3½ years as a physician in Military Hospitals attached to frontline units engaged in fighting. After the army he served at Evangelismos Hospital in Athens, as a resident and was granted, after exams, the specialty of Internal Medicine.

Razis died on 1 September 2017, at the age of 94.

== Oncology in Greece ==
In 1954 he travelled to USA, where he worked for the following seven years, in the clinical and research Departments of Internal Medicine and Medical Oncology in leading hospitals such as Illinois Research and Educational Hospital, Cook Country Hospital – in Chicago, Ill., and Memorial Sloan-Kettering Cancer Center and Roswell Park Memorial Hospital in New York and Buffalo, respectively.

In 1961 he returned to pioneer modernizing Medical Oncology in Greece. He started working as a Scientific Advisor to the newly established Greek Cancer Society and consequently, with a group of U.S. trained physicians, he led the organization of the Cancer Institute of Piraeus where he served as President of the Scientific Committee, member of the Board of Directors, and Director of the First Medical Oncology Clinic in Greece.

He was instrumental in creating the environment for training a considerable number of Greek Medical Oncologists at the Cancer Institute of Piraeus. He also promoted clinical cancer research transferring much of the knowledge he acquired in the US to a new generation of doctors who went on to spread the oncology specialty in universities and public hospitals.

After socialization of Medicine, he joined Hygeia, the leading private hospital where he founded the first Medical Oncology Department in the private sector. Over the years, he served as President of the Scientific Committee and President of the Board of Directors. He is also credited with organizing the first Ethics Committee in a private hospital in Greece.

== The Delphi Society ==
Razis always maintained a keen interest in the environment, as well as a deep concern for increased population of the earth, which resulted from the rising standards of hygiene as well as advances in medicine, without the corresponding adjustment of the reproductive rate. He became increasingly worried about the possibilities of catastrophic and irreversible damage to the environment, what became known as the sixth mass extinction of life of earth. He founded the Delphi Society of which he presides since 1995. The society is concerned with the biological world view of human behavior and the current issues of modern humanism.

The Delphi Society’s goals are embodied in The Delphi Declaration which aimed at contributing effectively to the principal issues confronting human kind today which are largely the prevention of global ecological disaster and the Creation of an environment supportive of peace and progress for all human beings.

The Delphi Society organized two Interdisciplinary International Congresses with the participation of prominent Scientists and Nobel Laureates. Since 1996 Delphi Society organized Monthly scientific meetings in Athens on topics related to the social and ecological crises that threaten life on the planet with the 6th mass extinction.

== Affiliations ==
Razis was a member of the American Society of Clinical Oncology, of the American Society of Surgical Oncology, a member of the International Humanist and Ethical Union and a permanent member of the International Academy of Humanism, whose membership is limited to 80 scholars and Nobel laureates from all scientific fields.

== Publications ==
Razis wrote extensively both in academic periodicals and in serious press in Greece, Europe and The United States, on a wide ranging subjects ranging from medical research (mainly Oncology), to the social and economic aspects of healthcare in Greece, to ecological and social crisis in relation to Human Nature.

Razis published four books in English: Two on the socio – ecological crisis:

1. The Human Predicament – An International Dialogue on the Meaning of Human Behavior (Prometheus Books, New York, USA publishers), 1996.
2. The Human Predicament II – Ecological Dynamics and Human Nature. The risk of a mass extinction of life in the planet. (Published by the Greek Ministry of Culture), 2003.

and two on Medical Topics:

1. Medical Ethics and/or Ethical Medicine. Dennis V. Razis, MD Professor George Mathe, and M. Jodeau-Grymberg. Publishers: Scientific Elsevier, Paris, 1989.
2. Cancer: Present Advances and Future Perspectives. Sharon Kleefield Ph.D and Dennis V. Razis MD, editors, 2005.
