= Witchcraft accusations against children in Africa =

Witchcraft accusations against children in Africa have received increasing international attention in the first decade of the 21st century.

The phenomenon of witch-hunts in Sub-Saharan Africa is ancient, but the problem has been exacerbated by charismatic preachers such as Helen Ukpabio. According to UNICEF, accusations are spurred on by "urbanization, poverty, conflict and fragmenting communities".

== Practice ==
Recent reports by UNICEF, United Nations High Commissioner for Refugees, Save the Children and Human Rights Watch have also highlighted the violence and abuse towards children accused of witchcraft in Africa. Accusations of witchcraft in Africa are a very serious matter as the witch is culturally understood to be the epitome of evil and the cause of all misfortune, disease and death. Consequently, the witch is the most hated person in African society and subjected to punishment, torture and even death.

The victims of witchcraft accusations in African societies have usually been the elderly, the disabled, albinos and anyone who was considered different. In recent years due to the impact of rapid urbanisation, economic decline, as well as the HIV/AIDS pandemic, children have become more and more the victims of witchcraft accusations, especially orphans. Other factors of the rise of accusations include the rise of charismatic preachers such as Helen Ukpabio, generational social conflicts and the deterioration of education systems. Religiously-inspired films also legitimize beliefs about children witches.

Child victims of witchcraft accusations are more vulnerable than adult victims as they cannot defend themselves as they are confronted with physical and psychological abuse from their family and community.

The sheer scale and intenseness of the recent witch-hunts targeting children classifies as unprecedented in written history.

— Ethnologist Felix Riedel

Children accused of witchcraft may be subjected to violent exorcism rituals by African Pentecostal-Charismatic pastors who mix Christianity with African witchcraft beliefs. Such exorcism may include incarceration, starvation, being made to drink hazardous substances or even being set on fire with gasoline. In other cases accused children are expelled and end up living on the streets, are trafficked and in some instances they are killed.

== By country ==
=== Angola ===
In Angola, many orphaned children are accused of witchcraft and demonic possession by relatives in order to justify not providing for them. Various methods are employed: starvation, beating, unknown substances rubbed into their eyes or being chained or tied up. Many of those who are rejected by their family end up in orphanages and are shunned by the population.

=== The Gambia ===
In the Gambia, about 1,000 people accused of being witches were locked in government detention centers in March 2009. They were forced to drink an unknown hallucinogenic potion, according to Amnesty International. They were then forced to confess to witchcraft, with some being severely beaten.

=== Uganda ===
Witchdoctors, who also identify as traditional healers, will consult the spirits for anyone who can pay their fee. The spirits will communicate via them the kind of sacrifice for appeasement that they want. Often these sacrifices are chickens or goats, but when such sacrifices fail to make the client prosper instantly, ‘the spirits' will demand human sacrifices.

When a child is sacrificed, the witch doctor and his accomplices will generally undertake the whole process. This includes: the witch-hunt, the abduction, followed by the removal of certain body parts, the making of a potion and lastly if required the discarding of the child's body.

=== Nigeria ===
In Nigeria, Helen Ukpabio and other Pentecostal pastors have incorporated African witchcraft beliefs into their brand of Christianity, resulting in a campaign of violence against young Nigerians. Children and babies branded as evil are being abused, abandoned and even murdered. The preachers make money out of the fear, providing costly exorcism services to their parents and their communities. Human rights activists opposing the practice have been threatened and some, such as humanist Leo Igwe, mobbed and harassed by police. One source estimates 15,000 children in the Niger Delta alone have been forced on the streets by witchcraft accusations.

[Children] are taken to churches where they are subjected to inhumane and degrading torture in the name of 'exorcism'. They are chained, starved, hacked with machetes, lynched or murdered in cold blood.

— Humanist Leo Igwe

In Akwa Ibom State and Cross River State of Nigeria, about 15,000 children were branded as witches and most of them end up abandoned and abused on the streets. A documentary aired on Channel 4 and the BBC, Saving Africa's Witch Children, shows the work of Gary Foxcroft and Stepping Stones Nigeria in addressing these abuses. The Danish humanitarian Anja Ringgren Lovén founded a charity to rescue abandoned and tortured children, and to give them the opportunity to go to school.

=== Sierra Leone ===
In Sierra Leone and neighbouring countries, the young survivors of the ebola epidemic are often accused of witchcraft, losing parents to the disease and community support to superstition.

According to a disputable empiric construction, sick infants tend to have better survival rates due to witch-hunts:

[T]he effect of the witch cleansing probably lasts for years in the sense that mothers are predisposed to tend their babies with more hopefulness and real concern. Therefore many babies who, before the arrival of the witchfinder, might have been saved if the mothers had had the heart and will to stop at nothing to tend their babies, will now survive precisely because they will receive the best attention, as the mothers now believe that the remaining children are free of witchcraft. So there is a reduction in the infant mortality rate in the years immediately following the witchcleansing movement.

=== Congo ===
In the Democratic Republic of the Congo, it is estimated that there are 25,000 homeless children living on the streets of the capital city. Of these, 60% were expelled from their homes because of allegations of witchcraft. Accusations of witchcraft is the only justifiable reason for the refusal to house a family member, no matter how distant the relation. As a result, 50,000 children are kept in churches for exorcisms.

=== Ethiopia ===
In Ethiopia, Mingi is the traditional belief among the Omotic-speaking Karo people and Hamar people in southern Ethiopia that adults and children with physical abnormalities are ritually impure. The latter are believed to exert an evil influence upon others, so disabled infants have traditionally been disposed of without a proper burial. Children are killed by forced permanent separation from the tribe by being left alone in the jungle or by drowning in the river.

Reasons for being declared impure include birth out of wedlock, the birth of twins, the eruption of teeth in the upper jaw before the lower jaw, and chipping a tooth in childhood.

== Possible solutions ==
Interventions until now have been limited and localised such as the safe houses run by Safe Child Africa and their partners in Akwa Ibom State in Nigeria by Bishop Emílio Sumbelelo of St. Joseph's Catholic Church, Roman Catholic Diocese of Uíje, Angola, and by Africa Outreach in Malawi. Following the distribution of documentaries on the topic, such as Saving Africa's Witch-Children (2008) and Dispatches: Return to Africa's Witch Children, global awareness of the problem of child witchcraft accusations in Africa is growing as evidenced by the above-mentioned UNICEF and UNHCR reports.

According to Dr. Erwin Van der Meer, a researcher with the University of South Africa, it is likely that increased global awareness of the problem of child witchcraft accusations in Africa will eventually lead to more initiatives to assist its victims. Nevertheless, it is equally important to address the underlying socioeconomic, political and environmental factors that contribute to this problem.

Van der Meer suggests that, in the meantime, the general population in countries where child witchcraft beliefs are prevalent need to be convinced that the torture and killing of children is unacceptable. This can be done by means of grass-roots awareness and prevention campaigns, conferences and theological education with the support of religious leaders. The judiciary, human rights organizations, civil society, and local and national governments can also aid this.

Leo Igwe criticizes Western interpretations of witchcraft as a socially stabilizing mechanism and suggests that the most effective way to end witch persecution is to state clearly the superstitious nature of witchcraft belief. According to Igwe, campaigns against witch persecution should be based on fact and science. While Igwe supports collaborating with faith-based individuals and organizations, his approach includes calling out religious efforts that threaten or undermine advocacy against witch persecution.

== Spread to the UK ==
Research by Leo Ruickbie has shown that the problem of child witchcraft accusations is spreading from Africa to areas with African immigrant populations. In some cases this has led to ritualised abuse and even murder, particularly in the UK with such high-profile cases as that of Kristy Bamu in 2010.

== See also ==
- Witchcraft accusations against children
- Kindoki
- Modern witch-hunts

Related:

- Child sacrifice in Uganda
- Murder for body parts in African traditional medicine
- Persecution of people with albinism, Africa
- West African Vodun
