= End of the Wicked =

1999 Nigerian horror film

End Of The Wicked
- Original release poster
- Directed by: Teco Benson
- Written by: Helen Ukpabio
- Produced by: Helen Ukpabio
- Starring: Charles Okafor; Charles Okafor; Hilda Dokubo; Alex Usifo; Helen Ukpabio; Ramsey Nouah
- Cinematography: Solomon Nwoko
- Edited by: Iyke Okafor Nwoko
- Music by: Stanley Okorie
- Production company: Liberty Films
- Release date: 1999
- Running time: 94 minutes
- Country: Nigeria
- Language: English

End Of The Wicked is a 1999 Nigerian horror film directed by Teco Benson and written by Helen Ukpabio. The film was blamed for a rise in witchcraft accusations against children in the 1990s and early 2000s.

== Plot ==
The film centers on the Amadi family, comprising Chris, his wife Stella, their two children and Chris's Mother. Unknown to the family, Chris's mother is a member of a witchcraft coven and operates under the name Lady Destroyer. Through her involvement with the coven, she orchestrates a series of misfortunes against her own family, affecting Chris's business, marriage and children. The children experience disturbing nightmares, while Chris's personal and professional life begins to deteriorate. As the family's problems escalate, Chris's mother manipulates him into seeking help from a traditional spiritual practitioner, while discouraging him from listening to his wife's concerns. The coven also influences children, including members of the Amadi family, to participate in its activities. Meanwhile, Stella seeks spiritual intervention and eventually encounters a Christian pastor, who encourages her to embrace Christianity. Chris, however, rejects the opportunity to change his ways and ultimately dies as a result of his mother's actions.

Following Chris's death, Stella is accused of being responsible for his demise. With the help of the pastor, she refuses to participate in a traditional ritual intended to establish her innocence and instead turns to prayer. During a subsequent prayer session, Lady Destroyer's activities are exposed, and she confesses to killing her son and causing harm to other members of the family. An animal-like creature emerges from her body before she dies, bringing an end to her schemes.

== Cast ==
- Charles Okafor as Chris
- Hilda Dokubo as Stella
- Alex Usifo Omiagbo as Beelzebub
- Patience Oseni as Mama Chris
- Larry Okon as Morgan
- Mary Ushie as Stephanie
- Helen Ukpabio as Pastor
- Elizabeth Akpabio as Tina
- Iniobong Ukpabio as Mercy
- Kanu Unoaba as Tempest
- Abasiofon as Junior
- Ramsey Nouah as Emeka
- Mfonido Ukpabio
- Chukwudi Onu

== Reception ==
The movie was very controversial in Nigeria and abroad and was heavily criticized for "blurring the line between fact and fiction."
