= Witchcraft accusations against children =

Overview of the topic

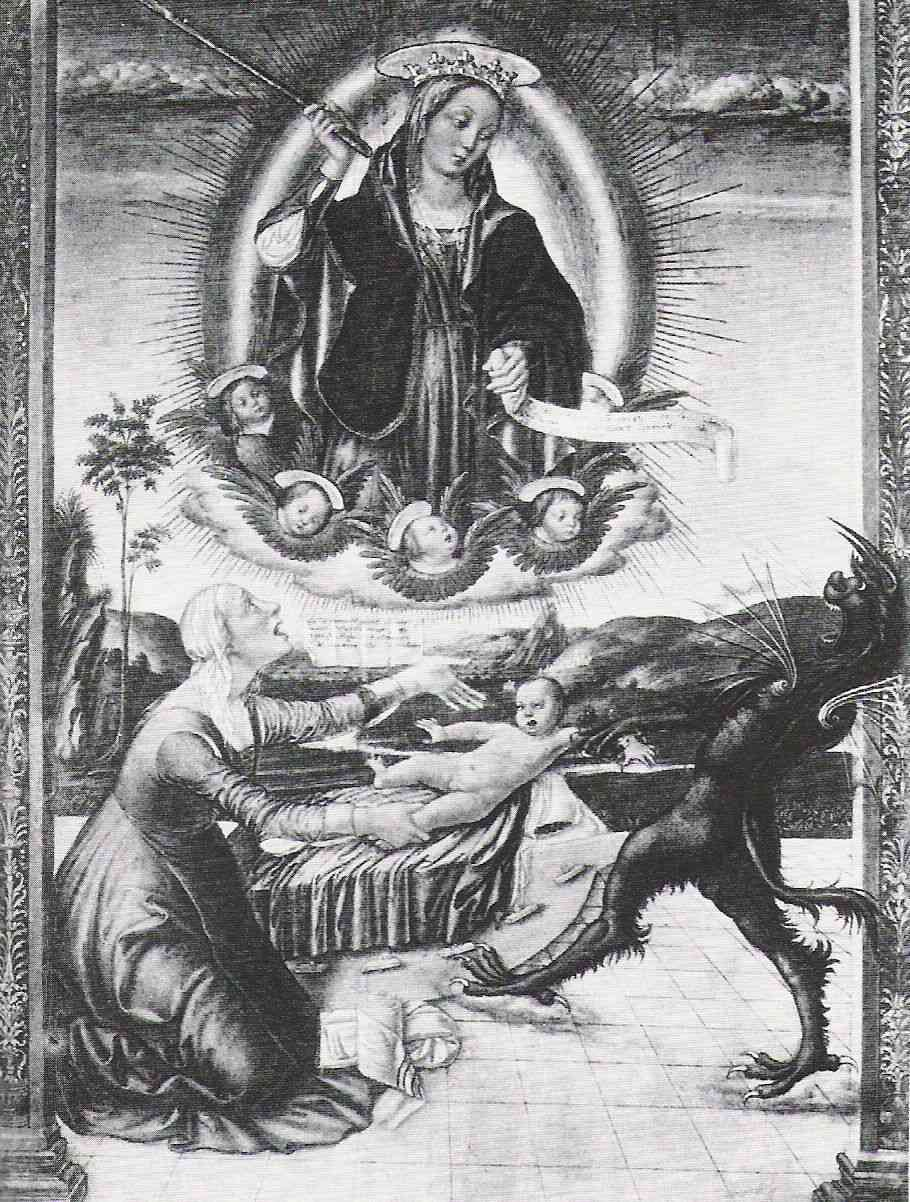
The Madonna frees an infant from the clutches of a demon (15th century), painting by Niccolò Alunno

Children have been accused of witchcraft, both historically and in contemporary times, in societies that harbor beliefs about the existence of witches and black magic. These accusations have led to punishment, imprisonment, torture, and execution of children.

== Historical ==
=== Witch finders and accusers ===
In sixteenth-century Europe, older children sometimes comprised a special category of witch hunters, bringing accusations of witchcraft against adults. In 1525, the traveling judge in the Navarrese witch hunt utilized two "girl witches" who he felt would be able to identify other witches. He hung about forty of these "witches" based on the testimony of the two girls.

Child witchhunters sometimes accused their family members of being witches. In seventeenth-century Europe, one child, Alison Device, was accused of witchcraft by a young boy who fell into a "fit" after refusing to acquiesce to her requests. Alison, believing that she had inherited her magical powers from her grandmother, who had inadvertently "tainted" the bloodline with her supernatural powers, confessed to using witchcraft against the boy. Her younger siblings, Jennet and James, were used as witnesses in her prosecution. Jennet and James provided testimony against their sister, leading to her eventual execution by hanging. The two siblings were once again questioned following Alison Device's trial and execution about a neighborhood meeting, which resulted in allegations leveled against several more adults and children. By the end of that year, Jennet had accused and seen the executions of several neighborhood adults, her sister, brother, mother, and grandmother.

The most renowned trials caused by child accusations occurred in Salem, Massachusetts in 1692. Children were viewed as having an important role in convicting witches, due to their being able to identify people impulsively. Children who made such allegations often directed them at adults with whom they had strained relationships such as teachers or puritanical neighbors.

=== Child witches ===
By the start of the seventeenth century, many children were being punished and put in prison for taking part in alleged witchcraft. This usually occurred because of their alleged participation in Sabbats. It was a common belief that witches' children inherited witchcraft from their parents. It was often the practice to charge a whole family of witchcraft, even if only one individual was suspected. Accused witches who confessed often claimed that they learned witchcraft from a parent.

Pierre de Lancre and Francesco Maria Guazzo believed that it was enough proof of a witch's guilt if they had parents who were accused witches. They believed "witch" parents introduced the children to Satan, took the children to Sabbats, married children to demons, inspired the children to have sex with Satan(devil) or had sex with Satan with the child present. Many times the child accused of witchcraft, due to being shunned, became aggressive and threatened community members, thereby reinforcing community beliefs that the child was a witch.

The sixteenth century brought forth more prevalent child involvement in witchcraft hunts and accusations, which slowly turned the narrative to the persecution of children themselves as witches. Children admitted to the practice of witchcraft to accuse their teachers and mentors alike, which led to children began to be accused themselves by the seventeenth century.

There are several cases of witchcraft in the late seventeenth and early eighteenth centuries that involved children accused as witches. In Sweden in 1669 a large number of children were included in a witch hunt and in Würzburg as in Salem in 1692, children were the focus of witch hunts. In the early seventeenth century, the territory of Würzburg was a prevalent actor in persecuting children. Over 40 children were executed due to being accused of witchcraft during this time. The late seventeenth century brought forward the child witch accusations in Calw, Germany, though to a lesser extent than in Würzburg.

In Augsburg, beginning in 1723 an investigation into twenty children between the ages of six and sixteen resulted in them being arrested following accusations of witchcraft. Said to have been led on by the Devil, these children were accused of malicious acts through the town. These proposed acts led to the children being imprisoned in filthy conditions, turned in by their own parents. They were held for a year in solitary confinement before being transferred to a hospital. The last child was freed in 1729.

One example of a child-witch narrative in Germany is of a seven-year-old girl named Brigitta Horner. In 1639, Brigitta claimed to be a witch and that she had participated in witch's Sabbats where the Devil was present. Brigitta claimed to have been baptized in the name of the Devil instead of God. The pastor who baptized Brigitta was married to her grandmother who was accused of teaching Brigitta witchcraft.

Norway was also home to child witch accusations in the seventeenth century, following the rest of Europe in the witch craze. A specific narrative includes a group of children in the Northern district of Finnmark that were accused of witchcraft. This group was made up of six girls, accused in the mid-seventeenth century. These girls were Ingeborg Iversdatter, Maren Olsdatter, Karen Olsdatter, Karen Nilsdatter, Kirsten Sørensdatter, and Sigri Pedersdatter. Ingeborg Iversdatter was the first child to be accused of witchcraft, having been reported by an adult. Many of these children had family connections to others accused as witches.

== Contemporary belief in child witchcraft ==
=== UK ===
In the United Kingdom, research by Dr Leo Ruickbie showed that the problem of child witchcraft accusations was spreading from Africa to countries with African immigrant populations. In some cases this has led to ritualized abuse and even murder. This was evident in the high-profile case of Kristy Bamu in 2010.

In 2000, a young girl, Victoria Climbie, was sent by her parents to live with her great-aunt Marie-Thérèse Kouao to attend school and receive a better education. Doctors and social workers suspected Kouao to be physically abusing and neglecting Victoria following two suspicious hospitalizations – although Victoria was discharged in her great-aunt's care in both instances. Kouao turned to pastors and churches, stating that Victoria was suffering from demonic possession, and eventually authorized a deliverance ritual to be performed on her by the pastor of the church she attended. Subsequently, Victoria's condition continued to deteriorate from the prolonged abuse, neglect, and torture, eventually leading to her admission to the North Middlesex Hospital. She died on February 25, 2000, from heart, lung, and kidney failure. Kouao and her boyfriend were both convicted of murder following Victoria's death, both receiving a life sentence.

In 2005, three adults were charged and convicted of cruelty to a child. The eight-year-old girl was entrusted to one of the three adults who was reportedly a distant relative of the child's mother. The young girl was eventually accused of witchcraft by another child within the household. She suffered severe abuse by the adults in their attempt to force the devil from her body; including, starvation, beatings, and cuts to her chest. At one time, she was intentionally drowned and only saved for fear of the British Police suspecting the adults in the home of her murder and maltreatment.

In the year 2005, alone, there were eighteen separate allegations of abuse against children following an accusation of witchcraft or possession of a demonic entity.

=== Africa ===
In Africa, there have been numerous cases of children being targeted in witch hunts in the past couple decades.

In Bangui, the capital city of the Central African Republic, witchcraft accusations against children still occur. In the Central African Republic, as well as in other neighboring countries, witchcraft allegations against children have increased alongside the Christian revivalist churches. Christian pastors and "traditional healers" have sprayed children with gasoline, locked them in churches, at times without access to food, performed exorcisms, and forced the children to drink poison, according to The United Nations Children's Fund, also known as UNICEF.

In Congo, it is estimated that there are 25,000 homeless children living on the streets of the capital city. Of these, 60% were expelled from their homes because of allegations of witchcraft. Accusations of witchcraft is the only justifiable reason for the refusal to house a family member, no matter how distant the relation.

In Gambia, about 1,000 people accused of being witches were locked in detention centers in March 2009. They were forced to drink a dangerous hallucinogenic potion, according to Amnesty International.

In Ghana between 1994 and 2009 there were multiple counts of child witch hunts still happening.

In Malawi, specifically the Southern region, has also been home to child witchcraft accusations. With beliefs of child witches running prevalent in modern day, children and their teachers alike are still faced with the public's want for harsh punishments, including beatings and even executions. Present day beliefs still harbor negative connotations against children believed to be involved in witchcraft, and abuse and murder of said children are still prevalent as of 2013. This hatred for the children has also been linked to the HIV/AIDS pandemic, with child witchcraft being one blame for parents dying of AIDS, therefore leading to the child being punished and abandoned by family.

In Nigeria, some African Pentecostal pastors like Helen Ukpabio have incorporated African witchcraft beliefs into their brands of Christianity resulting in a campaign of violence against young Nigerians. Children and babies branded as evil are being mistreated, abandoned, and even murdered. The preachers make money out of the fear by providing costly exorcism services of their parents and their communities.

In the Nigerian states of Akwa Ibom and Cross River about 15,000 children were branded as witches and most of them end up abandoned and abused on the streets. A documentary aired on Channel 4 and BBC, Saving Africa's Witch Children, shows the work of Gary Foxcroft and Stepping Stones Nigeria (now Safe Child Africa) in addressing these abuses.

According to a disputable empiric construction, in Sierra Leone sick infants tend to have better survival-rates due to witchhunts: "the effect of the witch cleansing probably lasts for years in the sense that mothers are predisposed to tend their babies with more hopefulness and real concern. Therefore many babies who, before the arrival of the witchfinder, might have been saved if the mothers had had the heart and will to stop at nothing to tend their babies, will now survive precisely because they will receive the best attention, as the mothers now believe that the remaining children are free of witchcraft. So there is a reduction in the infant mortality rate in the years immediately following the witchcleansing movement".

While crisis is generally accepted as a factor in the DRC and Nigeria, its impact and ramifications are in discussion by African and European scholars. According to Riedel, two major Nollywood films depicting children as witches don't show any economic stress and play in a middle-class environment.

== See also ==
- Child sacrifice in Uganda
- Human rights in Nigeria
