= Saving Africa's Witch Children =

- Directed by: Mags Gavan, Joost van der Valk
- Starring: Gary Foxcroft
- Original language: English

Original release
- Network: Channel 4
- Release: 12 November 2008

Saving Africa's Witch Children is a documentary directed by Mags Gavan and Joost van der Valk. It features Gary Foxcroft and his organisation Stepping Stones Nigeria who campaign against the branding of children as witches in Nigeria, primarily by the evangelical "Liberty Foundation Gospel Ministries", headed by Helen Ukpabio.

In some of the poorest parts of Nigeria, Pentecostal evangelical fervour combines with longstanding beliefs in sorcery and black magic. Thousands of children are victimised, abused, abandoned or even killed as they are blamed for having brought about disease, misfortune, death and famine by alleged witchcraft.

The film was part of Channel 4's Dispatches Series and won numerous awards, including a BAFTA and an International Emmy for Best Current Affairs.

== See also ==
- Witchcraft accusations against children in Africa
- Witchcraft accusations against children
