= Anatomy murder =

Murder for medical research or teaching

An anatomy murder (sometimes called burking in British English) is a murder committed in order to use all or part of the cadaver for medical research or teaching. It is not a medicine murder because the individual body parts do not have any medicinal use. The motive for the murder is created by the demand for cadavers for dissection, and the opportunity to learn anatomy and physiology as a result of the dissection. Rumors concerning the prevalence of anatomy murders are associated with the rise in demand for cadavers in research and teaching produced by the Scientific Revolution. During the 19th century, the sensational serial murders associated with Burke and Hare and the London Burkers led to legislation which provided scientists and medical schools with legal ways of obtaining cadavers. Rumors persist that anatomy murders are carried out wherever there is a high demand for cadavers. These rumors, like those concerning organ theft, are hard to substantiate, and may reflect continued, deep-held fears of the use of cadavers as commodities.

== History ==
Dissection as a way of acquiring medical knowledge has existed since the ancient world, but during the Renaissance, increasingly widespread clandestine practices of post-mortem dissection led to fears that victims, especially the poor and outcast, would be murdered for their cadavers. During his years at the University of Padua, Andreas Vesalius made it clear that he had taken human remains from graveyards and ossuaries for his classic anatomical text De humani corporis fabrica. Both he and his successor, Gabriele Falloppio, were rumored to have practiced human vivisection, although these rumors were not substantiated; however, Falloppio himself reported that he was asked by the judicial authorities to carry out an execution on a condemned criminal, whose cadaver he then dissected. During the 18th century, prominent British obstetrician William Smellie was accused of murder to obtain cadavers for his illustrated textbook on childbirth. In 1751, Helen Torrence and Jean Waldie were convicted of murdering John Dallas, aged 8 or 9, and selling his cadaver to medical students in Edinburgh.

The great expansion in medical education in Great Britain in the early 19th century, as a result of the Napoleonic Wars, led to increased demand for cadavers for dissection. Body-snatching became more widespread, and local communities reacted by setting guards around graveyards. In 1828, Parliament convened a select committee to examine the means by which cadavers were obtained for medical schools. This was the same period when the most famous of the anatomy murders were carried out by William Burke and William Hare. They killed 16 people over the course of a year, selling the cadavers to the anatomist Robert Knox. Two years later, the London Burkers, John Bishop and Thomas Williams, murdered a boy identified as Carlo Ferrari, and attempted to sell his cadaver to a London surgeon.

The need for dead bodies mainly affected poor people. Anatomists gathered unclaimed bodies from workhouses and prisons using legal loopholes. This unfair system made it easy for the illegal body collection, which drove crimes like those of Burke and Hare. The crimes of Burke and Hare are the most well-known; the same practices were carried out worldwide. In Australia and New Zealand during the colonial period, anatomists obtained bodies from the indigenous population and prisoners. In the U.S., medical schools relied on the unclaimed bodies of the poor and the African American population

The most recent account of anatomy murders was in 1992, when a Colombian activist, Juan Pablo Ordoñez, claimed that 14 poor residents of Barranquilla, Colombia, had been killed to provide cadavers for the local medical school. One of the alleged victims managed to escape from his assailants and his account was publicized by the international press.

The exploitation was extended beyond class to racial targeting. 19th-century American medical schools disproportionately recruited cadavers from Black communities and Native populations, with some anatomists collecting skulls for racist "scientific" studies. This was facilitated by legislation that rendered unclaimed bodies - typically those of enslaved individuals or institutionalized minorities - legal material for dissection. The effects of these policies persisted well into the 20th century.

Besides laws, forensic science also became a significant deterrent. by the 1880s, fingerprinting, blood testing, and photographic proof made it increasingly difficult to hide anatomy murders. The London Burker's case in 1831 was a breakthrough wherein medical professionals began keeping records systematically of cadaver sources - something that grew into modern-day chain-of-custody techniques.

== Legislation ==
The difficulty of prosecuting cases of anatomy murders arises because of the difficulty of obtaining evidence. The victims are generally marginal and do not have anyone to report their disappearance. The cadavers, which may show evidence of homicide, are destroyed by dissection. Those dissecting the bodies may believe that they have been obtained legitimately, or may have a vested interest in keeping their practices quiet.

For these reasons, legislation from the 19th century on has focused on removing the motive for murder by providing legal sources of cadavers for medical research and teaching. In Great Britain, the Anatomy Act 1832 provided for cheap, legal cadavers by turning over the bodies of those who died in caretaker institutions to medical schools. Although there were public protests at using the bodies of the poor as raw material for medical students, proponents of the act were able to use fear of burking in order to get it passed. The Massachusetts Anatomy Act of 1831 was also inspired by the anatomy murders.

It is clear that the legislation reduced the demand for illegally obtained cadavers and may have acted as a deterrent against grave-robbing, as the latter practice persisted in localities without adequate provision for cadavers to dissect. It is likely, however, that the main deterrent against anatomy murders was the increasing sophistication of forensic science from the 19th century onward.

Medical anthropologist Nancy Scheper-Hughes makes a comparison between the anatomy murders of the 19th century and the current organ trafficking networks. the fieldwork in ten nations, the poor are compelled to sell kidneys and other organs to wealthy customers, much like the poor were exploited for dissection during the past. Similar to the Burke and Hare scenario, these contemporary behaviors illustrate how the demand for medical procedures can lead to the exploitation of human bodies as commodities, particularly among the marginalized.

There are forensic parallels too: while 19th-century anatomists were prone to blind eyes towards disreputable sources of corpses, some modern transplant centers have been known to accept knowingly organs obtained illegally. Such parallels suggest that the moral issues in treating bodies as commodities, first exposed by anatomy murders, remain unresolved in global medicine.

== See also ==
- Murder for body parts
