= Association of Black Humanists =

British non-religious support organisation

- Predecessor: London Black Atheists
- Formation: 2012
- Founders: Clive Aruede, Lola Tinubu
- Website: londonblackatheists.com

Association of Black Humanists (formerly known as London Black Atheists) is a British organisation based in London, England. It encourages humanists and atheists to meet up, socialise, share information and support other atheists as they "come out" to friends and family, particularly (but not limited to) people in ethnic minorities and people of the African diaspora.

== Formation ==
Association of Black Humanists was formed (as London Black Atheists) in November 2012 by Clive Aruede, a former Catholic Church eucharistic minister, Lola Tinubu, who had grown up an evangelical Christian and two other friends. They formed the group as both had found it difficult and felt socially isolated without the acceptance of the religious communities they had grown up in. Aruede has also made the observation that while the group is not separatist, in his experience black people are more likely to "come out" within a group with other black people than a predominantly white group, and the group supports all free thinkers, nonbelievers, atheists and humanists.

Aruede became an atheist after confronting challenging questions from his 12-year-old daughter and researching cosmology, genetics and evolution. Tinubu left her religion following a visit from her Nigerian father that made her confront the cognitive dissonance she saw between his faith and his scientific understanding.

Both felt there was a need for an atheist advocacy and support group for people from minorities, and in particular those from conservative religious societies in which religion can define one's way of life. Tinubu found that many people in Africa and the African diaspora equate rejecting religion with rejecting one's cultural heritage and traditions.

The association of Black Humanists uses the language of LGBT self-disclosure such as "coming out" when publicly stating one has left a religion and supports individuals' anonymity who do not wish their atheism to be revealed publicly.

== Work and meetings ==
The association of Black Humanists uses online platforms such as Facebook and Meetup to organise talks, meetings, social functions, marches and fundraisers. It us not affiliated with Humanists UK. Works in partnership with Central London Humanists group. The group does not focus on speaking out against a particular religion, but discussion typically centres around Christianity, as Aruede explains this is the religion most blacks from the Caribbean and continent of Africa have been brought up in.

Association of Black Humanists has hosted prominent speakers such as Leo Igwe (Breaking the Taboo of Atheism in Black Communities'), Gus Casely-Hayford and Maryam Namazie, who is also a patron of the organisation.

They have also presented at secular conferences such as the Humanists UK conference 2017, the 2017 International Conference on Free Expression and Conscience, and the Council of Ex-Muslims of Britain annual conference 2015.

On Christmas Day 2014 Aruede gave the annual Christmas message for the Metro newspaper on behalf of The Association of Black Humanists.

== See also ==
- Atheism in the African diaspora
- Faith to Faithless
- Humanists UK
- Southall Black Sisters
