= Helen Ukpabio =

Nigerian Christian leader

- Born: 1969 (age 56–57); Akwa Ibom State, Nigeria
- Occupation: Evangelical Christian pastor
- Spouse: Dr. Elijah Ukpabio
- Children: 3
- Website: libertyfoundationgospelministries.org

Helen Ukpabio is the founder and head of African Evangelical franchise Liberty Foundation Gospel Ministries based in Calabar, Cross River State, Nigeria. She is widely accused of causing large-scale harassment and violence against children accused of witchcraft.

== Personal life ==
Ukpabio was born in the village of Mbente, Akwa Ibom State, Nigeria, and is married to Dr. Elijah Ukpabio. She has three children.

Ukpabio claims to have been a teenage witch, "betrothed to Satan" before being "set free by the gospel."

In 1992, Ukpabio founded Liberty Foundation Gospel Ministries with the aim of spreading her often literal interpretations of the Bible to the people of West Africa.

== Views on demonic possession and witchcraft ==
Ukpabio and her organisation believe that Satan has the ability to manifest himself in the bodies of children by demonic possession and make them become his servants in the form of 'witches' or 'wizards'.

Exploiting superstitious beliefs, particularly those related to spiritual or demonic possession or witchcraft, Helen Ukpabio's organisation has grown exponentially throughout Nigeria and West Africa since its foundation. There are now major Liberty Gospel Churches in Cameroon, Ghana and South Africa as well as Nigeria. Ukpabio has published her views in several books, which have also been heavily criticized. An example is 'Unveiling The Mysteries of Witchcraft', in which she states that:

If a child under the age of two screams in the night, cries and is always feverish with deteriorating health he or she is a servant of Satan.

She also produces, through her film production company, Liberty Films, part of the Liberty Foundation Gospel Ministries franchise, a number of films to spread the view that children can become possessed by evil spirits. The most famous of these is End of the Wicked in which child actors are shown to eat human flesh and murder their parents.

Her activities are not limited to Nigeria. Ukpabio announced she would preach in Limbe, Cameroon, to promote a program she calls "Freedom From Strong Family Darkness", October 18–22, 2017.

She incites violence against imputed witches who are usually women, children and elderly persons. The people of Cameroon should resist Ukpabio. They should reject her 'gospel' of hate and division in families and communities. - Leo Igwe

== Media coverage ==
In 2007 an Observer newspaper article claimed Ukpabio and other evangelical pastors were encouraging an upsurge in the numbers of children being accused of witchcraft and being abused and stigmatised by parents and communities as a result.

In 2008, the TV news documentary Dispatches Saving Africa's Witch Children by UK broadcaster Channel 4 stated the views that she expresses have led to a massive upsurge in children stigmatised and abandoned by their families in West Africa, particularly in Akwa Ibom State, Nigeria. Both reports followed the activities of two charities, CRARN and Stepping Stones Nigeria, now known as Safe Child Africa, which aimed to look after the children who have been rejected by their parents for displaying what they believed to be signs of witchcraft, assertions which have also been made by the Associated Press. The Telegraph Thursday 14 April 2011. The accusation and her defence against them have been reported in The New York Times.

A 2009 conference in Nigeria that was critical of her organisation was violently disrupted by members of her organisation.

=== Libel suit against her critics ===
In 2014, Ukpabio brought a libel case against the British Humanist Association (BHA) and Witchcraft and Human Rights Information Network (WHRIN) seeking damages of £500,000,000. Ukpabio claims that the BHA misrepresented her by saying that she ascribed certain behaviours in children to Satanic possession when she in fact attributed them to possession by 'witchcraft spirits'. The BHA described the case as libel tourism. After sending a mob to disrupt a meeting led by humanist Leo Igwe in 2009, she filed a suit for $1.3 million against the government for allowing the police to protect Igwe's group. The suit was promptly dismissed. Ukpabio also used smears against other groups critical of her actions, notably the non-governmental organization Safe Child Africa. She has been prevented by the Home Office from entering Great Britain by revoking her visa after calls from campaigners in 2014 that she be banned from Britain on child protection grounds.
