= The Transcendental Temptation =

Book by Paul Kurtz

The Transcendental Temptation: A Critique of Religion and the Paranormal
- Author: Paul Kurtz
- Language: English
- Publisher: Prometheus Books
- Publication date: 1986
- Publication place: United States
- Media type: Print
- ISBN: 0-87975-645-4

The Transcendental Temptation: A Critique of Religion and the Paranormal is a 1986 book by the philosopher Paul Kurtz. The book was published by Prometheus Books, a company founded by Kurtz in 1969.

== Summary ==
Kurtz analyzes the bases of religion: how provable are the claims of the famous prophets who founded religion in their name: Jesus, Moses, Muhammad, Joseph Smith, Ellen G. White and others? He asks what the prospects are for developing a humanistic society based on scientific and humane foundations.

The book considers several aspects of religion including the existence of God, belief in the afterlife, reincarnation, mysticism, astrology and ufology; he concludes by directing the reader towards rational skepticism.

== Reception ==
In the award of the Norton Medal (endowed by Charles Phelps Norton) to Kurtz in 2001, The Transcendental Temptation was noted, amongst Kurtz's other contributions to secular humanism, as a seminal work on the topic. The award also noted Kurtz's founding of the Center for Inquiry.
