= Atheism in the African diaspora =

Atheism experienced by black people outside of Africa

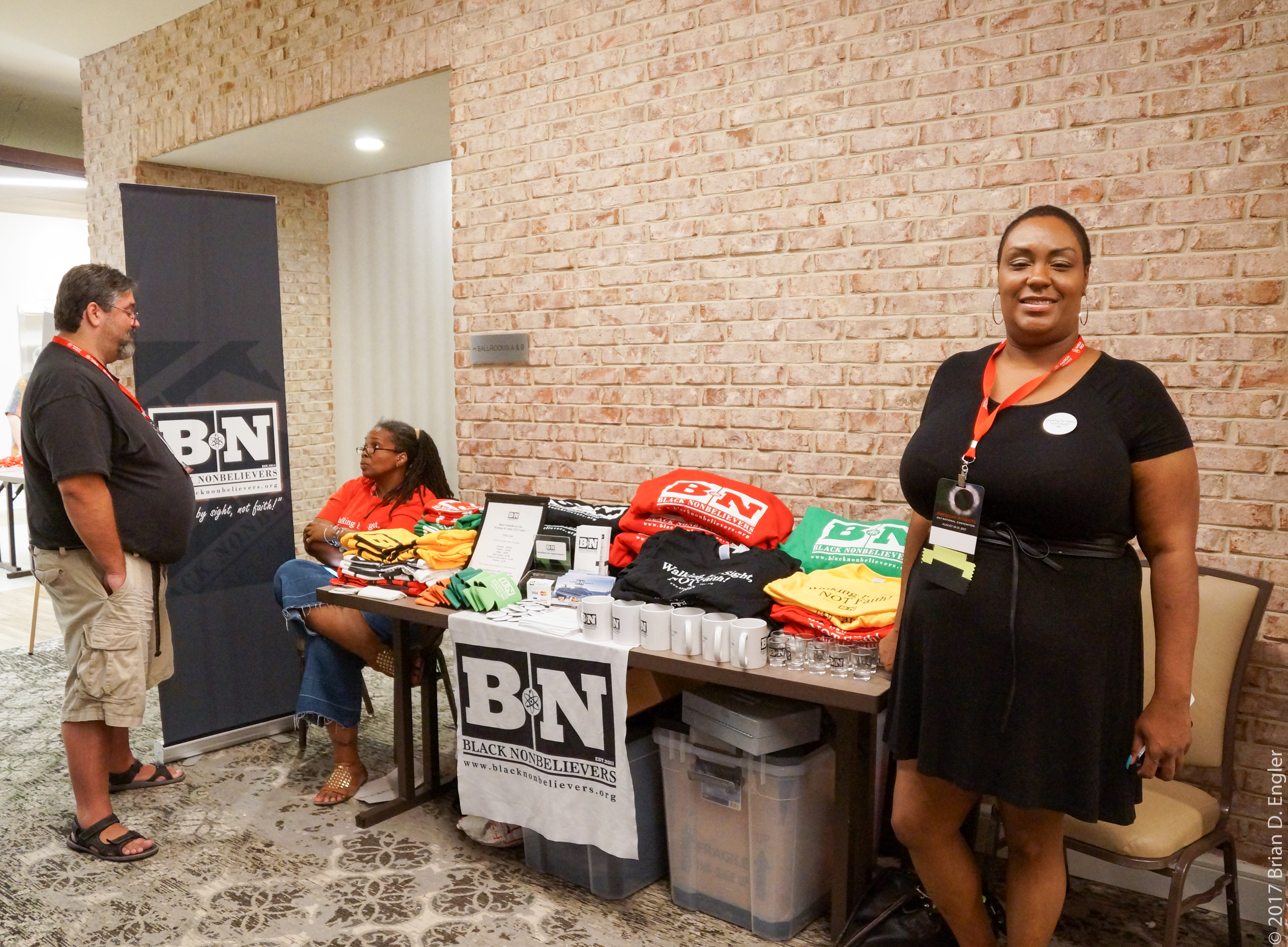
Black Nonbelievers table at AACon August 2017

Atheism in the African diaspora is atheism as it is experienced by black people outside of Africa. In the United States, black people are less likely than any other ethnic groups to be religiously unaffiliated, let alone identifying as atheist. The demographics are similar in the United Kingdom. Atheists are individuals who identify with atheism, a disbelief, denial, or simply a lack of belief in a God or gods. Some, but not all, atheists identify as secular humanists, who are individuals who believe that life has meaning and joy without the need for the supernatural or religion and that all individuals should live ethical lives which can provide for the greater good of humanity. Black atheists and secular humanists exist today and in history, though many were not always vocal in their beliefs or lack of belief.

Issues that face black atheists include the fact that they are "racially different" from the larger and more visible atheist movement and "religiously different" from the black community. Black atheists are often a minority group in their own countries and locations. They are an even smaller minority in the atheist group, which is itself often a minority.

Sometimes, atheism is seen as a whites-only club by black people and in the United States, African American history, slavery, and the civil rights movement are all closely tied to Christianity. Religion has very much become part of the tradition of black history and culture. Even when there is a strong atheist or secular humanist movement in the African diaspora, it has been ignored. In surveys of history, black expressions of humanism and secularism have been ignored by historians.

A study published in 2021 by the Pew Research Center found that 21% of Black Americans were religiously unaffiliated, with 1% identifying as atheist.

== Black atheism and religion ==
During the Harlem Renaissance, several prominent black authors in America wrote or discussed their criticisms of the Christian church in various forms. Anthony Pinn called Christianity a tool for keeping the status quo and historically, for supporting slavery. Michael Lackey sees African American atheism as a way to celebrate a "revolutionary victory" over what he perceives as an oppressive and violent god-concept. Many African American atheists see hope in a secular world view and find "religious culture a reason for melancholic mourning." Similar views have been expressed by black atheists in the UK, some of which have roots in countries like Nigeria. These atheists are sorry to see religion having a deleterious effect on their homeland.

African-American communities tend to believe that the church is the center of morality and often turn to the church to solve various social problems that the government is not being perceived to solve or care about. As writer Cord Jefferson put it, "For a long time, black houses of worship doubled as war rooms to plan protest actions and galvanize people made weary by centuries of racist violence and legislation." Many black people have turned to religion to find the answers to their own suffering. In addition to the historic component of church and black life, many social problems are solved by churches who run local food banks, provide day care or job training. Many atheist African Americans see it as important to work with religious leaders and organizations to solve various social justice issues facing the community.

African-Americans who come out as atheist may face a "prohibitive" social cost. Journalist Jamila Bey wrote, "It's difficult - if not impossible - to divorce religion from black culture." This social cost is not unique to blacks who leave Christianity, but also occurs among black Muslims who leave the religion. Some atheists who have left Islam have been disowned by family or received death threats. Black atheists in the United Kingdom face similar problems, where coming out as an atheist is associated with the fear of being "ostracised and demonised." For this reason London Black Atheists was formed in the United Kingdom by Clive Aruede and Lola Tinubu. At an atheist conference which took place next to a Christian conference in 2015, one of the black atheist attendees found herself attacked and accused by a black Christian woman for having a "slave mentality" and being "demon possessed."

However, when individuals stereotype African Americans as "religious" it ignores the "diversity of thought that actually exists within the black community." In order to combat feelings of isolation, many black atheists turn to the internet or social media to become part of online atheist groups. As atheist groups which welcome black individuals grow and are more prominent, their number are also growing, suggesting that there has been a "silent stratum of America's black population quietly doubting."

== Atheism and racism ==
The overall atheist movement can be seen as "tacitly racist" in that "the movement is not generally interested in the issues that affect people of color" and racism becomes "invisible" and therefore difficult to talk about. Sikivu Hutchinson has written that there is a "staggering lack of interest" about issues facing black people from the atheist community. Some atheist groups see no reason to have separate organizations for black people and do not see or understand the different kinds of issues that black atheists face. Mandisa Thomas wrote that her own experiences "ranged from feeling totally welcome to feeling totally isolated, even ignored."

Atheism is also seen as racist by those outside of the movement. Debbie Goddard, director of the African Americans for Humanism recalls being told by fellow students in African-American studies that atheism and humanism were "harmful Eurocentric ideologies." Goddard describes how atheism is seen by many black people as "not just a threat to religious beliefs and tradition, but also a threat to black identity and black history." Christian apologist Ray Comfort, who is white, has controversially claimed that atheism is "an insult to black heritage."

Black atheist Sikivu Hutchinson has critiqued the Eurocentric and often "white supremacist" orientation of the mainstream atheist movement with regard to its predominantly white leadership and its obsession with church-state separation to the exclusion of racial justice, gender justice and redress of segregation. Anthony B. Pinn reminds readers of The Humanist that it's important to let black people set their own "racial justice agenda." Black atheists face different issues than white atheists do and black atheists want their issues to be addressed.

Sometimes the problem is just that individuals in atheist groups don't understand racism in general. As one black woman describes, she is often asked about her page which is called "Black Atheists." She describes why titling the page this isn't racist and that having a similar "White Atheists" page isn't equivalent because white people are not part of a marginalized group in the United States. Goddard has also experienced individuals who believed that it was racist to create special groups within atheism to appeal to African Americans.

== Black women and atheism ==
Black women risk their own social status and reputation when they are active atheists. They are more likely to become estranged from their religious families, due to openly expressing their atheism. Within an already religious group, African American women make up "the most religious demographic" in the United States and when black women leave their religion, they also leave "an entire social system." Women, in particular, are expected to be active in the church and feel the burden more strongly to be engaged in church life. In many black communities and churches, women are the binding force that holds it together. Sikivu Hutchinson notes that black women are expected to adhere to paradigms of moral and social "respectability" that make them more predisposed to being religious. Women are the people who organize, arrange, fundraise, and make up the greatest number of attendees. A black woman's social position can be tied to the church.

It is also thought that because women are the main parents in many households and play a large part in passing on culture and socializing children, they are expected to fulfill that role. By turning away from religion, it could be seen as turning away from their duties, their culture, and the religious reproduction of future generations.

The atheist, non-religious and humanist movements continue to be dominated by white men in America. Greta Christina believes that much of the atheist movement is still largely white because the movement itself has been subject to unconscious bias against diversity. Black atheist women are less visible than black atheist men. A piece in Salon, written in 2015, discusses how there are more women and people of color in the atheist movement than the "media would let on."

Despite the challenges facing black atheist women in the United States, many have stepped into leadership roles, creating atheist groups which are friendly to black participants. Mandisa Thomas has seen an increase in groups that are both secular and have more inclusive practices which welcome people of color and women. Hutchinson maintains that black feminist atheist and humanist activism challenges both Christian religious orthodoxy and white-dominated atheist/humanist orthodoxy. Black feminist atheist and humanist belief and praxis focus on changing the sexist, racist, classist and heterosexist institutional and systemic inequities that disenfranchise communities of color and women of color. In response to black women's concerns about the "whiteness" of organized atheism and humanism, five black women atheists (Bridgette Crutchfield, Candace Gorham, Sikivu Hutchinson and Mandisa Thomas) were featured on the cover of the Humanist magazine in 2018 for the first time in the publication's history. In 2019, the first conference focusing on secular, humanist, agnostic, atheist and freethinking women of color was held in Chicago.

== LGBT black atheists ==
Black atheists who identify as LGBT report that they have faced a large amount of "hate" coming from the "black community itself." This may be due to the large sense of religiosity or other factors, according to The Huffington Post. Some criticize the lack of response some black churches have had with the current social issues black communities are facing. For example, gay acceptance is traditionally lower in black churches, as they tend to be more conservative. Many black churches openly oppose homosexuality, or they are completely silent on the matter. Some feel that strict church beliefs interfere with greater social issues affecting black communities. Many black churches have been slow to react to the HIV/AIDS issues affecting black communities. And some say that by stigmatizing homosexuality and HIV/AIDS, it could be making the issue worse for the communities affected. These critics think that since the black church is an integral part of many black communities, the church should be one of the leaders in affecting social justice and change. These and other factors can drive people away from the church and religion.

== De-stigmatizing atheism ==
While many African Americans use faith in religion to organize and galvanize people, there are more and more people seeing religion as part of the past. Sikivu Hutchinson believes that it is important to offer support structures for people leaving religion. Mercedes Diane Griffin Forbes, former Managing Director of the Institute for Humanist Studies, thinks the atheist community should be more understanding and more "visible in communities of color." In 2010, Jamila Bey called for black atheists to be proud of their atheism or agnosticism.

Many new organizations and ways to recognize black atheists have been created. African Americans for Humanism (AAH), founded in 1989, has grown to become a transnational organization reflecting black humanist concerns around the world. In the United Kingdom, London Black Atheists was established to reach out to atheist members of the black community around London. The British Humanist Association has also reached out to support Black Pride Events.

Day of Solidarity for Black Non-Believers (DoS) was started by Donald Wright in 2010. DoS is normally celebrated on the last Sunday of February. In order to increase awareness for black atheists, AAH ran a series of ads depicting free-thinking African Americans and contemporary atheists together with the tagline, "Doubts about religion? You're one of many." Debbie Goddard said that the billboards were designed to help people see that there was a tradition of atheism and freethinking in the black community. In 2013 Black Skeptics Los Angeles created a college scholarship called "First in the Family" which helps children who grew up in difficult situations afford college.

== Black atheist organizations ==
- African Americans for Humanism
- Black Atheists of America
- Black FreeThinkers
- Black Nonbelievers, Inc.
- Black Skeptics Los Angeles
- London Black Atheists

== See also ==
- Anthony B. Pinn
- Sikivu Hutchinson
- Mandisa Thomas
- Irreligion in Africa
