= Stanley Okorie =

Nigerian music producer

- Also known as: Stanley Kaosi
- Born: Stanley Kaosi
- Origin: Nigeria
- Genres: Gospel; Highlife
- Occupations: Singer; songwriter; record producer
- Years active: 1990s–present

Stanley "Kaosi" Okorie is a Nigerian singer, songwriter and soundtrack producer who has worked in the Nigerian film industry, Nollywood. He is credited with composing and recording soundtracks for a large number of Nigerian films released from the late 1990s onward.

== Career ==
Okorie began his recording career as a gospel singer under the name Stanley Kaosi, with material associated with his band Grace Band. He moved into film soundtrack work through a collaboration with the gospel musician Sammie Okposo, who introduced him to producers in Nollywood and worked with him on the soundtrack for the film Compromise, which Okorie has cited as his first soundtrack credit.

In an interview with The Guardian Nigeria, Okorie said that before he started, much of the music used in Nollywood films drew on jazz and blues, with little Igbo or African-language content, and that his entry into the field reflected an attempt to fill that gap. He has described the early period of his soundtrack work as poorly remunerated, including instances where compensation was made in soft drinks rather than cash.

Over the course of his career, Okorie has stated that he composed and recorded thousands of songs for Nigerian films, and that for a period of several years he was producing music for a large share of Nollywood releases. Outlets covering his work have described him as one of the defining figures of soundtrack production during the home-video era of Nollywood.

== Selected soundtracks ==
=== Songs by Okorie that have been singled out in coverage of his work include: ===
— "Karishika", from the 1998 supernatural film Karishika, described by The Nollywood Reporter as a recurring chant set against the film's narrative.

— "Billionaire", written for the film Return of the Billionaire starring Osita Iheme, Chinedu Ikedieze and Yul Edochie, which circulated widely on social media platforms including TikTok in 2023.

— "Happy Mumu", written for the film Sonachi My Wife.

== Reception and legacy ==
In a 2023 essay for What Kept Me Up, Jeremiah John wrote that Okorie's soundtracks frequently summarised the plot of the films they accompanied rather than scoring scenes in a conventional sense, and argued that this approach contributed to the songs' subsequent memorability among Nigerian audiences. The same essay placed Okorie alongside Tope Alabi as one of two figures whose voices were closely associated with the soundtracks of older Nollywood films.

A 2026 article in The Nollywood Reporter on Nollywood theme songs described Okorie as one of the figures who "defined an era" of Nollywood music alongside Tope Alabi, and characterised his style as "witty" and "narrative-driven". Writing in The Quietus in 2026, Mary Chiney discussed Okorie's body of work as part of the cultural texture of the home-video era of Nigerian cinema, describing his songs as "the vocalisation of the collective id" of a rapidly changing Nigeria.

A profile of Okorie published in 2022 by the BBC Igbo service also covered his role in Nollywood soundtrack production.
