= Murder for body parts =

Type of crime with intent to obtain human body parts

Murder for body parts also known as medicine murder (not to be confused with "medical murder") refers to the killing of a human being in order to excise body parts to use as medicine or purposes in witchcraft. Medicine murder is viewed as the obtaining of an item or items from a corpse to be used in traditional medicine. The practice occurs primarily in sub-equatorial Africa.

The illegal organ trade has led to murder for body parts, because of a worldwide demand of organs for transplant and organ donors. For example, criminal organizations have engaged in kidnapping and killing people for the purpose of harvesting their organs for illegal organ trade. The extent is unknown, and non-fatal organ theft and removal is more widely reported than murder.

Historically, anatomy murders took place during the earlier parts of modern Western medicine. In the 19th century, the human body was still poorly understood, and fresh cadavers for dissection and anatomical study were sometimes difficult to obtain. Mortuaries remained the most common source, but in some cases, such as the notorious Irish murderers Burke and Hare in Edinburgh, victims were killed then sold for study and research purposes.

== Medicine murder ==
=== Purpose and frequency ===
The objective of medicine murder is to create traditional medicine based partly on human flesh. Medicine murder is often termed ritual murder or muthi / muti murder, although there is evidence to suggest that the degree of ritual involved in the making of medicine is only a small element of the practice overall. Social anthropological ethnographies have documented anecdotes of medicine murder in southern Africa since the 1800s, and research has shown that incidences of medicine murder increase in times of political and economic stress.

The practice is commonly associated with witchcraft, although ethnographic evidence suggests that this has not always been the case, and that it may have been accorded local-level political sanction. Medicine murder is difficult to describe concisely, as it has changed over time, involving an ever-greater variety of perpetrator, victim, method and motive. Most detailed information about the minutiae of medicine murder is derived from state witnesses in trials, court records and third-party anecdote.

The phenomenon is widely acknowledged to occur in southern Africa, although no country has issued an accurate and up to date record of the frequency with which it takes place. This is not only because of the secrecy of the practice, given its controversial status, but also because of difficulties in classifying subcategories of murder. Medicine murder has been a topic of urban legends in South Africa, but this does not diminish its status as a practice that has resulted in legal trials and convictions of perpetrators.

Medicine murder in southern Africa has been documented in some small detail in South Africa, Lesotho and Swaziland, although it is a difficult subject to investigate because of its controversial standing in customary practices and laws. Very few research and discussion documents have been devoted to this subject. Three concerning Lesotho were published in 1951, 2000 and 2005 regarding the same events in the 1940s and 1950s; one concerning Swaziland was published in 1993 covering the 1970s and 1980s; and a commission of enquiry held in South Africa in 1995 covering medicine murder and witchcraft in the 1980s and 1990s.

=== Methodology ===
The perpetrators are usually men, although women have been convicted as well, most notably in Swaziland when Phillippa Mdluli was hanged in 1983 for commissioning a medicine murder. Perpetrators vary widely in age and social status.

An individual or group of individuals commissions an inyanga (a herbalist skilled in traditional medicine) to assist them by concocting a medicine called muti. The medicine supposedly strengthens the 'personality' or personal force of the person who commissions the medicine. This increased personal force enables the person to excel in business, politics, or other sphere of influence. A human victim is identified for murder in order to create the medicine.

Victims vary widely in age and social standing. They are often young children or elderly people, and are both male and female. In some instances, the victim is identified and 'purchased' via a transaction involving an often nominal amount of money. The victim is then abducted, often at night, and taken to an isolated place, often in the open countryside if the murder is being committed in a rural area. It is usually intended that the victim be mutilated while conscious, so that the medicine can be made more potent through the noises of the victim in agony. Mutilation does not take place in order to kill the victim, but it is expected that the victim will die of the wounds.

Body parts excised mostly include soft tissue and internal organs – eyelids, lips, scrota, labia and uteri – although there have been instances where entire limbs have been severed. These body parts are removed to be mixed with medicinal plants to create a medicine through a cooking process. The resulting medicine is sometimes consumed, but is often made into a paste that is carried on the person or rubbed onto scarifications.

=== Variances ===
Since the 1970s, the manner in which medicine murder is practiced has become altered to the methods described above, although the continued practice of medicine murder demonstrates that belief in human flesh as a powerful medicinal component remains strong in some communities. It would appear that medicine murder in the 18th and 19th centuries may have been considered the legitimate domain of traditional chiefs and leaders, in order to improve agriculture and protect against war (see Human sacrifice).

Following industrialisation and growth of commerce, the range of purposes for which medicine was used to increase influence expanded significantly. In the early 1990s when South Africa was experiencing internal political strife between several political groupings, it became clear that some mutilations for medicine were opportunistic and incidental to the assassination of political opponents. There have also been occurrences of mutilation of corpses in medical facilities. In not all cases does the employment of a traditional healer seem to have been thought necessary to the process.

=== Notable cases ===
==== 1980 Thuli Mabaso ====
In March 1980 in Eswatini, 5-year-old Thuli Mabaso was murdered by the employer of her father, businesswoman and restaurateur Philippa Mdluli, who mutilated the girl's body after killing her to make potions in an attempt to enhance her business career. Mdluli became the last person to be executed by Eswatini when she was executed by hanging in July 1983.

==== 1994 Segametsi Mogomotsi case ====
In 1994, a 14-year-old named Segametsi Mogomotsi was murdered in Mochudi, Botswana and had her body parts removed. The killing was widely believed to have been for muti, and the police even recovered some excised organs. However, these were destroyed before being tested to establish them as human, leading to accusations of police complicity with the murder. The killing led to riots as students in Mochudi protested about police inaction, and eventually Scotland Yard from Britain were asked to investigate, as neutral outsiders. Their report was given to the Botswana government, which did not release it to the public. These events inspired some of the events in the book The No. 1 Ladies' Detective Agency by Alexander McCall Smith.

==== 2001 Thames torso case ====
A little boy whose headless and limbless body was found floating in the Thames in 2001 was identified by an arrestee in March 2011. The five-year-old's identity has remained a mystery after he was smuggled into Britain and murdered in a voodoo-style ritual killing. He was drugged with a ‘black-magic’ potion and sacrificed before being thrown into the Thames, where his torso washed up next to the Globe Theatre in September 2001. Detectives used pioneering scientific techniques to trace radioactive isotopes in his bones to his native Nigeria. They even enlisted Nelson Mandela to appeal for information about the murder.

They struggled to formally identify the boy, whom they called Adam, despite travelling to the West African state to try to trace his family. Nigerian Joyce Osiagede, the only person to be arrested in Britain as part of the inquiry, has claimed that the victim's real name is Ikpomwosa. In an interview with ITV's London Tonight, Mrs Osiagede said she looked after the boy in Germany for a year before travelling to Britain without him in 2001. She claimed she handed the boy over to a man known as Bawa who later told her that he was dead and threatened to kill her unless she kept silent.

Police have passed numerous files on the case to the Crown Prosecution Service but it has never gone to court. A second suspect, a Nigerian man, was arrested in Dublin in 2003 but was never charged. Mrs Osiagede was first questioned by police after they found clothing similar to that worn by ‘Adam’ in her Glasgow tower-block flat in 2002. The only clothing on his body was a pair of orange shorts, exclusively sold in Woolworths in Germany and Austria. Dressed in a traditional gold and green dress, Mrs Osiagede denied any involvement with the death of the young boy.

Asked who killed him, she said a ‘group of people’. She added: "They used him for a ritual in the water." Claiming the boy was six years old, she said: ‘He was a lively boy. A very nice boy, he was also intelligent.’ Detailed analysis of a substance in the boy's stomach was identified as a ‘black magic’ potion. It included tiny clay pellets containing small particles of pure gold, an indication that Adam was the victim of a Muti ritual killing in which it is believed that the body parts of children are sacred. Bodies are often disposed of in flowing water.

==== 2009 Masego Kgomo case ====
Masego Kgomo was a 10-year-old South African girl whose body parts were removed and sold to a sangoma in Soshanguve, South Africa. The little girl's body was found in bushes near the Mabopane railway station, north-west of Pretoria. Thirty-year-old Brian Mangwale was found guilty of the murder and sentenced to life imprisonment.

==== Joshlin Smith case ====
The mother of Joshlin Smith, a six-year-old South African girl, was sentenced to life in prison for trafficking her daughter. One person who testified in court claimed the girl was delivered to a sangoma who desired her eyes and skin.

== Illegal organ trade murders (the 'Red trade') ==
According to the World Health Organization (WHO), illegal organ trade occurs when organs are removed from the body for the purpose of commercial transactions. The illegal organ trade is growing, and a recent report by Global Financial Integrity estimates that globally it generates profits between $0.6 billion and $1.2 billion per year

In some cases, criminal organizations have engaged in kidnapping of people, especially children and teens, who are murdered and their organs harvested for profit. In 2014 an alleged member of the Mexican Knights Templar cartel was arrested for the kidnapping and deaths of minors, after children were found wrapped in blankets and stuffed in a refrigerated container inside a van.

According to the most recent Bulletin of the World Health Organization on the state of the international organ trade, 66,000 kidney transplants, 21,000 liver transplants, and 6000 heart transplants were performed globally in 2005, while another article reports that 2008 the median waiting time for the U.S. transplant list in 2008 was greater than 3 years and expected to rise, while the United Kingdom reported a lack of organs for 8000 patients, with the rate increasing at 8%. It was estimated that about 10% of all transplants occur illegally, with the Internet acting as a facilitator. Transplant tourism raises concerns because it involves the transfer of healthy organs in one direction, depleting the regions where organs are bought. This transfer typically occurs from South to North, developing to developed nations, females to males, and from colored peoples to whites, a trend that some experts say "has exacerbated old...divisions". While some organs such as the kidney can be transplanted routinely and the single remaining kidney is adequate for normal human needs, other organs are less easy to source. Liver transplants in particular are prominent, but incur an excruciating recovery that deters donations.

Most countries have laws which criminalize the buying and selling of organs, or the carrying out of medical procedures for the illegal organ trade.

== Capital punishment and organ harvesting in China ==
In March 2006, three individuals alleged that thousands of Falun Gong practitioners had been killed at Sujiatun Thrombosis Hospital, to supply China's organ transplant industry. The third person, a doctor, said the so-called hospitals in Sujiatun are but one of 36 similar concentration camps all over China.

The allegations were the subject of investigative reports by Edward McMillan-Scott, vice-president of the European Parliament, and by former Canadian Secretary of State David Kilgour and human rights lawyer David Matas.

The Kilgour-Matas report stated "the source of 41,500 transplants for the six year period 2000 to 2005 is unexplained" and concluded that "there has been and continues today to be large scale organ seizures from unwilling Falun Gong practitioners".

The report called attention to the extremely short wait times for organs in China—one to two weeks for a liver compared with 32.5 months in Canada—noting that this was indicative of organs being procured on demand. A significant increase in the number of annual organ transplants in China beginning in 1999, corresponded with the onset of the persecution of Falun Gong. Despite very low levels of voluntary organ donation, China performs the second-highest number of transplants per year. The report includes incriminating material from Chinese transplant center web sites advertising the immediate availability of organs from living donors, and transcripts of interviews in which hospitals told prospective transplant recipients that they could obtain Falun Gong organs. An updated version of their report was published as a book in 2009.

In 2014, investigative journalist Ethan Gutmann, published his own investigation. He conducted extensive interviews with former detainees of Chinese labor camps and prisons, as well as former security officers and medical professionals with knowledge of China's transplant practices. He reported that organ harvesting from political prisoners likely began in Xinjiang in the 1990s, and then spread nationwide. Gutmann estimates 65,000 Falun Gong prisoners were killed for their organs from 2000 to 2008.

Data on availability and speed of transplants within China (under 2 – 3 weeks in some cases compared to years elsewhere) led several renowned doctors to state that the statistics and transplant rates seen would be impossible without access to a very large pool of pre-existing donors already available on very short notice for hearts and other organs; several governments also established restrictions intended to target such a practice.

The extent of evidence still led to many responses expressing "deep concerns" at the findings, and several countries took action as a result of the concerns and findings. Responses were noted from the Queensland Ministry of Health in Australia (abolished training programs for Chinese doctors in organ transplant procedures and banned joint research with China on organ transplantation), A petition signed by 140 Canadian physicians urged the Government to warn Canadian nationals that organ transplants in China were "sourced almost entirely from non-consenting people".

In 2012, State Organs: Transplant Abuse in China, edited by David Matas and Dr. Torsten Trey, was published with contributions from 12 specialists. Several of the essays in the book conclude that a primary source of organs has been prisoners of conscience, specifically practitioners of Falun Gong.

In May 2008, two United Nations Special Rapporteurs reiterated their requests for the Chinese government to fully explain the allegation of taking vital organs from Falun Gong practitioners and the source of organs for the sudden increase in organ transplants in China since 2000.

In August 2009, Manfred Nowak the United Nations Special Rapporteur on Torture said, "The Chinese government has yet to come clean and be transparent ... It remains to be seen how it could be possible that organ transplant surgeries in Chinese hospitals have risen massively since 1999, while there are never that many voluntary donors available."

== Murder for dissection and study ==
An anatomy murder (sometimes called burking in British English) is a murder committed in order for all or part of the cadaver to be used for medical research or teaching. It is not a medicine murder because the body parts are not believed to have any medicinal use in themselves. The motive for the murder is created by the demand for cadavers for dissection, and the opportunity to learn anatomy and physiology as a result of the dissection. Rumors concerning the prevalence of anatomy murders are associated with the rise in demand for cadavers in research and teaching produced by the Scientific Revolution. During the nineteenth century, the sensational serial murders associated with Burke and Hare and the London Burkers led to legislation which provided scientists and medical schools with legal ways of obtaining cadavers. The practice has intermittently been reported since that time; in 1992 Colombian activist Juan Pablo Ordoñez, claimed that 14 poor residents of the town of Barranquilla had been killed for local medical study with a purported account by an alleged escapee being publicized by the international press. Rumors persist that anatomy murders are carried out wherever there is a high demand for cadavers. These rumors are hard to substantiate, and may reflect continued, deep-held fears of the use of cadavers as commodities.

== See also ==
- Persecution of people with albinism
- Witchcraft accusations against children in Africa
- Child sacrifice in Uganda
