= Kindoki =

Type of witchcraft in Congolese culture

Kindoki is thought by its believers to be a kind of witchcraft or possession by evil spirits. In the Democratic Republic of the Congo (DRC) and among Congolese immigrants in Europe, this belief is responsible for acts of child abandonment and ritual abuse of adults and children who were thought to have fallen victim to kindoki.

Children who are perceived to be possessed by kindoki are subjected to exorcisms that include beatings, starvation, and submersion in water.

The non-profit group Save the Children estimates that 70% of the roughly 15,000 street children in Kinshasa, the capital of the DRC, were kicked out of their homes after being accused of witchcraft.

The majority of witchcraft accusations come from traditional shamans. Some Christian preachers, however, have acted as consultants, by pointing out supposedly possessed children and carrying out "exorcisms".

== See also ==
- Witchcraft accusations against children in Africa
