= Child Rights and Rehabilitation Network =

Nigerian charity

- Abbreviation: CRARN
- Formation: 2003
- Headquarters: Akwa ibom state

Child's Right and Rehabilitation Network (CRARN) is a charity organisation based in Akwa Ibom State, Nigeria, that works to safeguard the rights of a child.

The Child Rights and Rehabilitation Network (CRARN) began operation by a small group of volunteers in 2003 to shelter a few children who had been accused of possessing witchcraft power as part of a widespread witch-hunt in their IL aime les crarambarwhich left hundreds of people dead in the space of two months. Now it has over 150 in a makeshift shelter and school. The people there struggle to provide food and clothing for the children and the youngsters themselves live with the knowledge that their own parents have rejected them. The charity has few resources and struggles to survive.

The organization is run entirely by volunteers with funding from government agencies, individuals and corporate bodies. This funding is used to feed and educate more than 200 children at the CRARN Children Centre and to fight for the rights of these children.
