= Child sacrifice in Uganda =

Ritualistic killing of children in Uganda

In Sub-Saharan Africa, "the practice of ritual killing and human sacrifice" continues to take place despite the illegality. In the 21st century, Uganda, Mozambique, and Mali, have practices documented in media reports.

== Background and context ==
=== Issue ===
Rural districts near Kampala, Uganda's capital, have been badly affected by kidnappings of vulnerable people, children in particular, for sacrificial purposes. It is a modern phenomenon that purports to be part of the country's old custom, through the use of traditional medicine, which roughly 80% of people rely on. In exposed communities, roadside posters, workshops, and alert systems have been erected to warn children and their families of the danger posed by witch doctors abducting for the purpose of child sacrifice.

=== Motive ===
Witch doctors, who also identify as traditional healers, will consult with mythical spirits for anyone who can pay their fee. The spirits are believed to communicate through them, the kind of sacrifice for appeasement that they require. Often these sacrifices are chickens or goats, but when such sacrifices fail to make the client prosper instantly, 'the spirits' are believed to demand human sacrifices.

=== Causes ===
Children are often victims of sacrifice for various reasons, the most common being they are relatively easy to abduct. As they are far more vulnerable than adults, children are more easily lured in or unable to fight back. Another reason children are abducted is that spiritually they are seen as 'purer'; a sacrifice that is "pure" or "unblemished" is believed to bring better results. If a child has been circumcised, scarred or has had their ears pricked, this represents disfigurement or impurity, and they may be spared from sacrifice. Some parents have marked their children in these ways to protect them.

In other cases, children are given to witch doctors by relatives out of desperation for money. A child's life is worth a high price, and it provides instant money for struggling families. Another cause for children being abducted is the belief that children represent new growing life and offering them as a sacrifice will bring prosperity and growth to the one procuring the sacrifice.

=== Child sacrifice ===
Generally, a witchdoctor will try other methods first to bring about change of a person's misfortunes or desires using herbal remedies or animal sacrifices. When change is not successful, resorting to child sacrifice is proposed because it is believed to be the most powerful. When a child is sacrificed, the witch doctor and his accomplices will generally undertake the whole process. This includes: the witch-hunt, the abduction, followed by the removal of certain body parts, the making of a potion and lastly if required the discarding of the child's body.

One type of sacrifice is the removal of blood, which is then used in medicines or mixed with herbs. It will be used in the place where success, healing or wealth is desired. In other cases, a child is buried under a building foundation, either dead or alive, or only their hands, feet and genitals to bring good luck to the new building.

=== Survivors ===
Children that survive are often left with traumatizing consequences for the rest of their lives. Most commonly survivors are left with large scars across their bodies; head and neck in particular. Genital mutilation is also a common occurrence for those that experience this ordeal, leading to urinary issues and distorted puberty development. The psychological damage to children affects their entire development; victims can struggle to develop ‘normal’ relationships after such an attack. Families are also affected as parents often bear the financial burden of covering short-term or long-term treatment.

== Dynamics ==
=== Desire for wealth ===
A study of the Ugandan context reveals a significant disparity between the wealthy elite and the average Ugandan, who struggles to make ends meet. It is nearly impossible for someone born into a poor family to ascend the social ladder. The gap between the rich and the poor, combined with discontent regarding the political status quo, endemic corruption, and a general sense that the country has lost its direction, breeds considerable discontent and frustration. It is in such an environment that witchdoctors thrive, promising desperate individuals a miraculous means to bridge the gap from have-not to have, from failure to success, and from poverty to wealth.

The small elite who amassed wealth in a relatively short time during Uganda's economic boom in the early 21st century serve as an example promoted by witchdoctors for their successful profession. They claim to have assisted many of the nouveau riche in acquiring their wealth. According to the head of the country's Anti-Human Sacrifice Taskforce, child sacrifice is directly linked to rising levels of development and prosperity, as well as an increasing belief that witchcraft can facilitate rapid wealth accumulation.

It is thought that child sacrifice increases the power of a witch doctor's magic because it makes the charms, amulets or talismans that are given to clients stronger. For this reason, witch doctors stay in practice, along with great financial benefit.

=== Witchdoctors and traditional healers ===
All witchdoctors identify as traditional healers but not all traditional healers are witchdoctors and most do not perform child sacrifice. This identification has caused witchcraft to be associated with the healing practices of the indigenous culture, generating a rise in fascination with witchcraft. This has resulted in a damaged reputation of those traditional healers and herbalists who do not use human flesh but are still blamed for these crimes.

=== Politicians seeking fortune ===
There is an increased risk of child sacrifice and increased work for witchdoctors around the elections. This is because high-profile Ugandans have bought into the practice by being convinced they need to sacrifice a child to win a seat as an MP.

== Case studies ==
=== Survivor ===
BBC News investigated a seven-year-old boy called Allan Ssembatya. He was attacked by a local witchdoctor and two acquaintances on his way home from school while walking with friends. In the witchdoctor's shrine he was struck on the neck, across the shoulders, and in the head with a machete. One of his testicles was removed and he was left for dead in a bush; he survived, but was in a coma for a month. The local witchdoctor admitted to this but the case is still pending due to slow investigation and allegations of corruption. Allan's family had to move homes and jobs to get through the ordeal and there are still adverse effects to this day.

=== Killed victim ===
Steven (Emmanuel) Kironde was killed at the age of six in 2009. He was in the care of his grandmother, who left the family home briefly for an errand, when he was abducted. His body was found the next morning decapitated behind the house. The witchdoctor was arrested however, three weeks later the police offered a pay out to the grandmother to drop the case. This was declined and further developments in the case have not been made. There are several cases like this in the judicial system.

=== Former witchdoctor ===
Polino Angela gave up this work in 1990; since then he has dedicated his time to converting 2,400 other witchdoctors. He claimed to have killed seventy children including his own ten-year-old son in his past. James Nsaba Buturo, the Minister of Ethics and Integrity, agreed with Angela's approach stating persuading change is better than retrospective punishment, which would cause a problem for justice.

In 2010, police in Uganda charged Polino Angela for lying to police about his child sacrifices. According to authorities, relatives and neighbors unanimously told them that Angela's son had died of malaria. Government officials said Angela had admitted to lying in order to drum up publicity and donations for his organization.

== Statistics ==
Statistics of child sacrifice can be hard to accurately gauge in Uganda. The Uganda Human Rights Commission published a report in 2014 that warned of an underestimation of cases. This was based on late claims and tampering of crime scenes.A UNICEF report stated 13 cases of child sacrifice were reported in 2014 and 2015 and six of the 2015 ones were related to elections.

== Current law ==
=== Legislation ===
Currently, there are three pieces of legislation governing child sacrifice in Uganda. The most recent of these was the October 2009 Prevention of Trafficking in Persons Act; this contained relevant sections on trafficking for the use of body parts. Prior to this there was only the Witchcraft Act of 1957 and the Children's Act 1997. Child sacrifice through witchcraft has been allowed because the authorities did not implement the Witchcraft Act within the community. It remains difficult to try and convict anyone accused under this Act as its vague expression and interpretation Child sacrifice is not specifically mentioned in it. This means that giving a maximum sentence for the murder of a child by sacrifice is extremely difficult and the courts rarely use it.

In 2016 an amendment to the Children's Act was passed. Under clause 10 it protects children from violence and provides a right to access child protection services. Spearheaded by activist Annie Nnaji, this development specifically prohibits child sacrifice, trafficking, sexual exploitation and female genital mutilation. It also ensures a service for children who have been victims and sets a mandatory structure for reporting abuse.

=== Anti-Human Sacrifice and Trafficking Task Force ===
This force was created in 2009 along with the Prevention of Trafficking in Persons Act. The government established the force with the intention that they would to oversee and coordinate investigations, collect statistics and work with the general public to stop this practice. The Force are covering more cases than law enforcement did before its establishment, but there is still a struggle to gain adequate evidence for convictions.

The task force consists of an officer with a motorcycle and it works without a proper budget. Consequently, many Ugandans believe that the gesture of the Ugandan government is more a matter of window dressing to avert local and international criticism than a genuine attempt.

=== International obligations ===
Uganda is obliged under multiple treaties to protect the rights of children. The 1989 Convention on the Rights of the Child requires Uganda to act in the best interest of the country's children by ensuring they all have basic human rights. Uganda also ratified the African Charter on Human and Peoples' Rights. Several articles within this charter set out clear obligations to protect human rights. In particular Article 4 and 5 protect everyone's right to life and freedom from bad and cruel treatment. Article 18 specifically identifies the protection for children. This international instrument works to promote and protect basic human freedoms and human rights throughout Africa. Uganda is obliged to fulfill these expectations by continuously establishing state mechanisms to prevent tragedies like child sacrifice.

== Awareness ==
The issue of child sacrifice in Uganda has been highlighted in the media over the past three years with ABC (Australia) and BBC producing several reports and documentaries. The media attention coincided with media campaigns by Ugandan NGOs such as RACHO, ANPPCAN-Uganda, faith-based organisations such as Kyampisi Childcare Ministries (KCM) and Rose's Journey—a collective effort of Ugandans and friends of Uganda to end child sacrifice.

== Future development ==
There was previously an issue with the application and implementation of relevant legislation on the ground and in court. To make this change in legislation successful its effects will need to be taught properly to the Task Force, where change can start from the ground. The second area of concern is within the court systems. Cases on child sacrifice currently go straight into the general court system. Cases get held up easily and take a long time to actually go through. A department of court set up to specifically tackle child sacrifice cases would provide a suitable structure for victims and their families. This has been supported by local authorities because it will help simplify the monitoring of activities.

== See also ==
- Spirit children
- Witchcraft accusations against children in Africa
- Persecution of people with albinism
- Medicine murder
- Traditional African medicine
