= International Academy of Humanism =

Council for Secular Humanism programme

The International Academy of Humanism, established in 1983, is a programme of the Council for Secular Humanism. It was established to recognize great humanists and disseminate humanist thinking. According to its declared mission, members of the academy are devoted to free inquiry, are committed to a scientific outlook, and uphold humanist ethical values.

The academy is limited to 80 members who include Nobel prize winners James Watson and Steven Weinberg. Its laureates also include author and Booker Prize winner Salman Rushdie, and biologist E. O. Wilson.
