= List of secular humanists =

This is a partial list of notable secular humanists.

== A ==
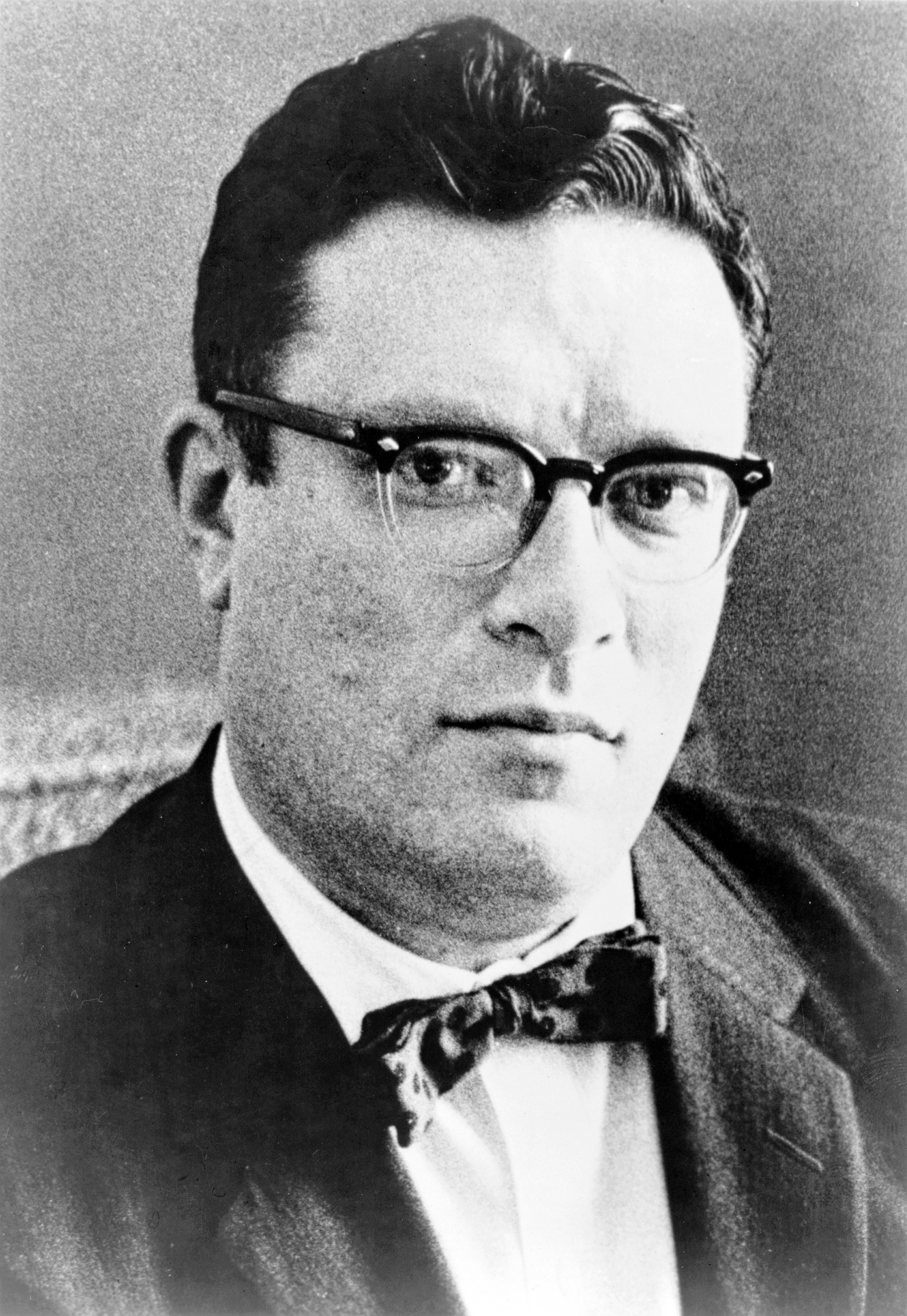
Asimov

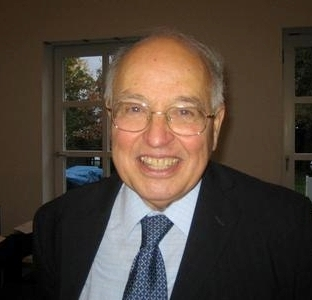
Atiyah

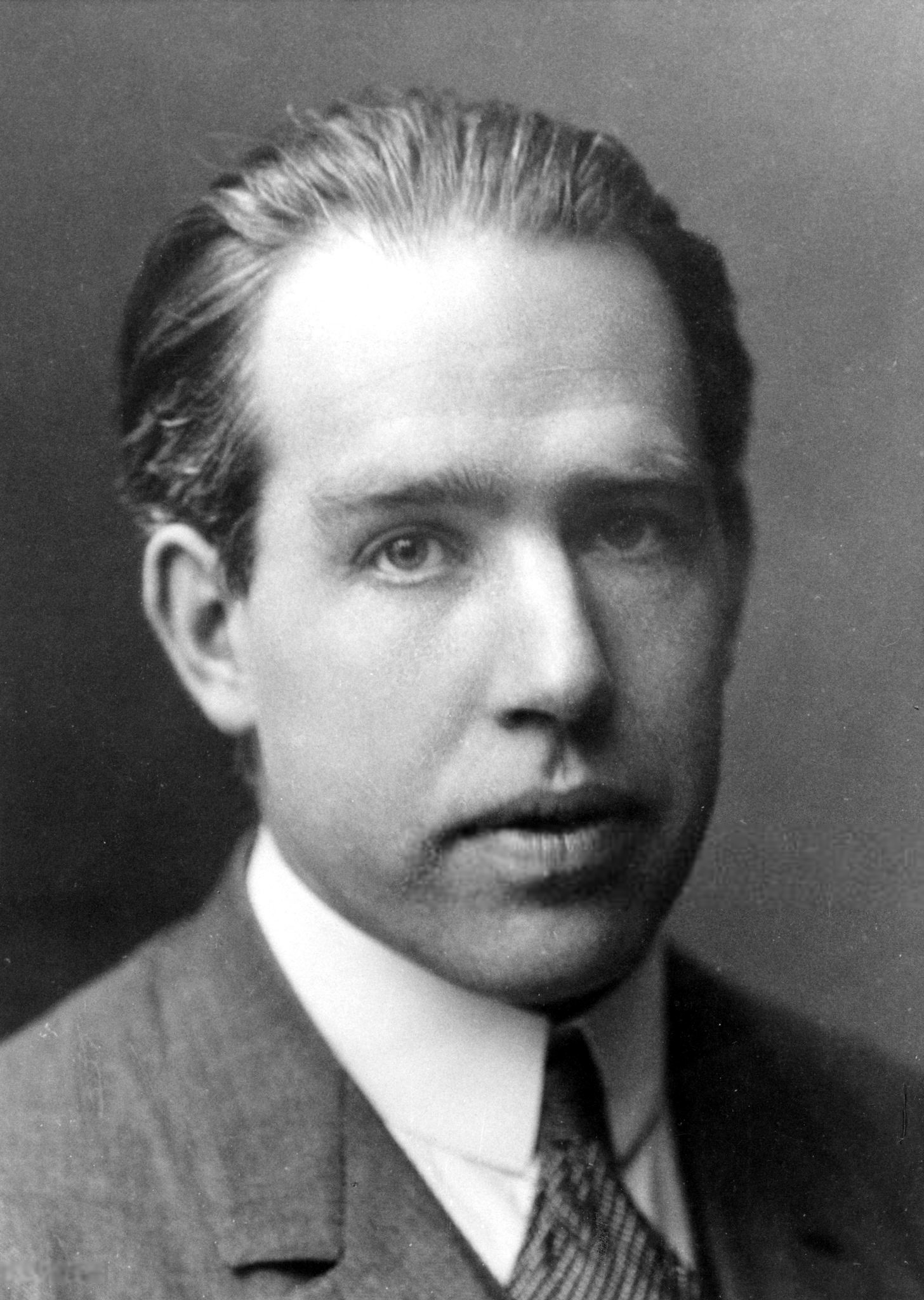
Bohr

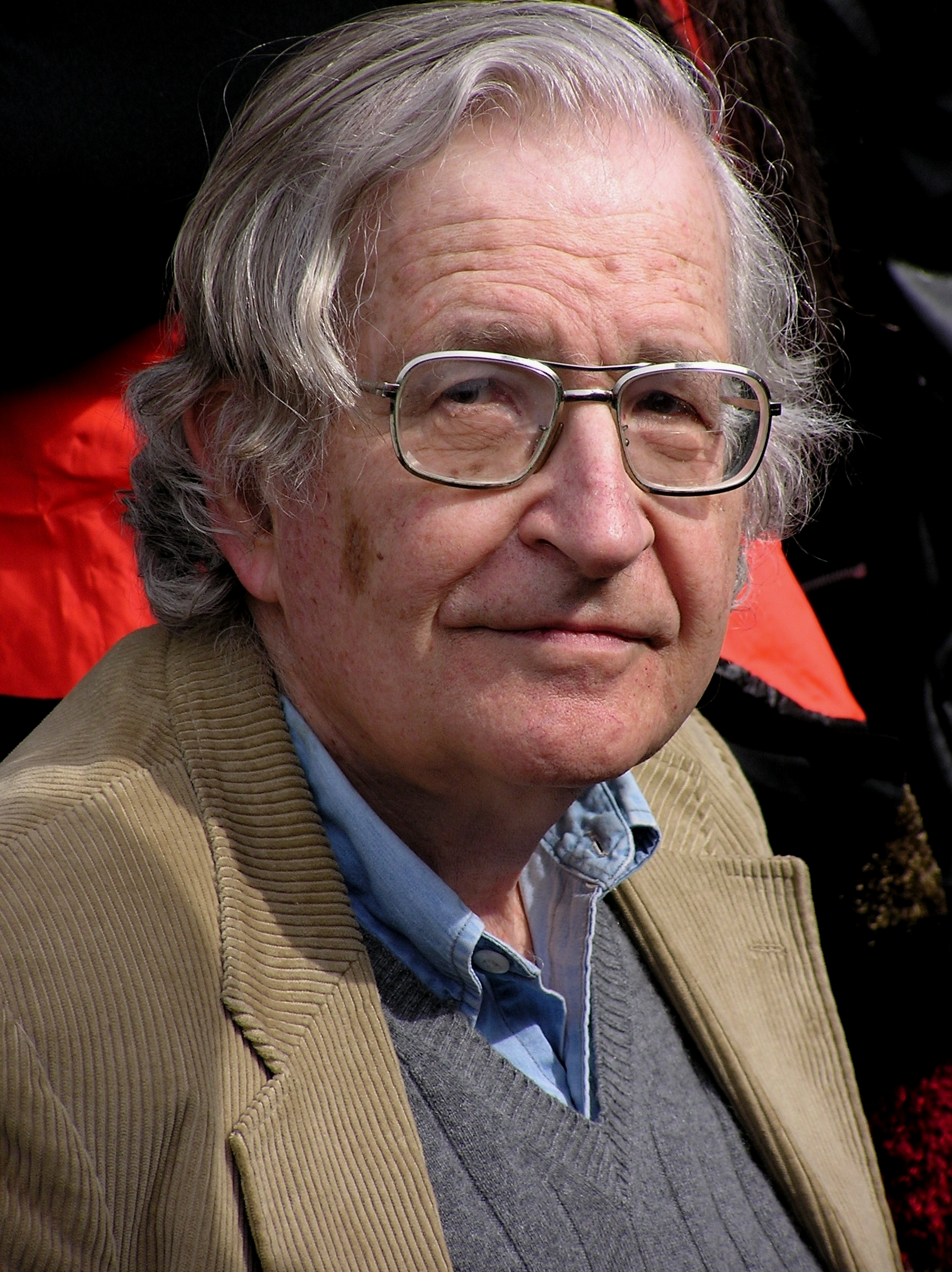
Chomsky

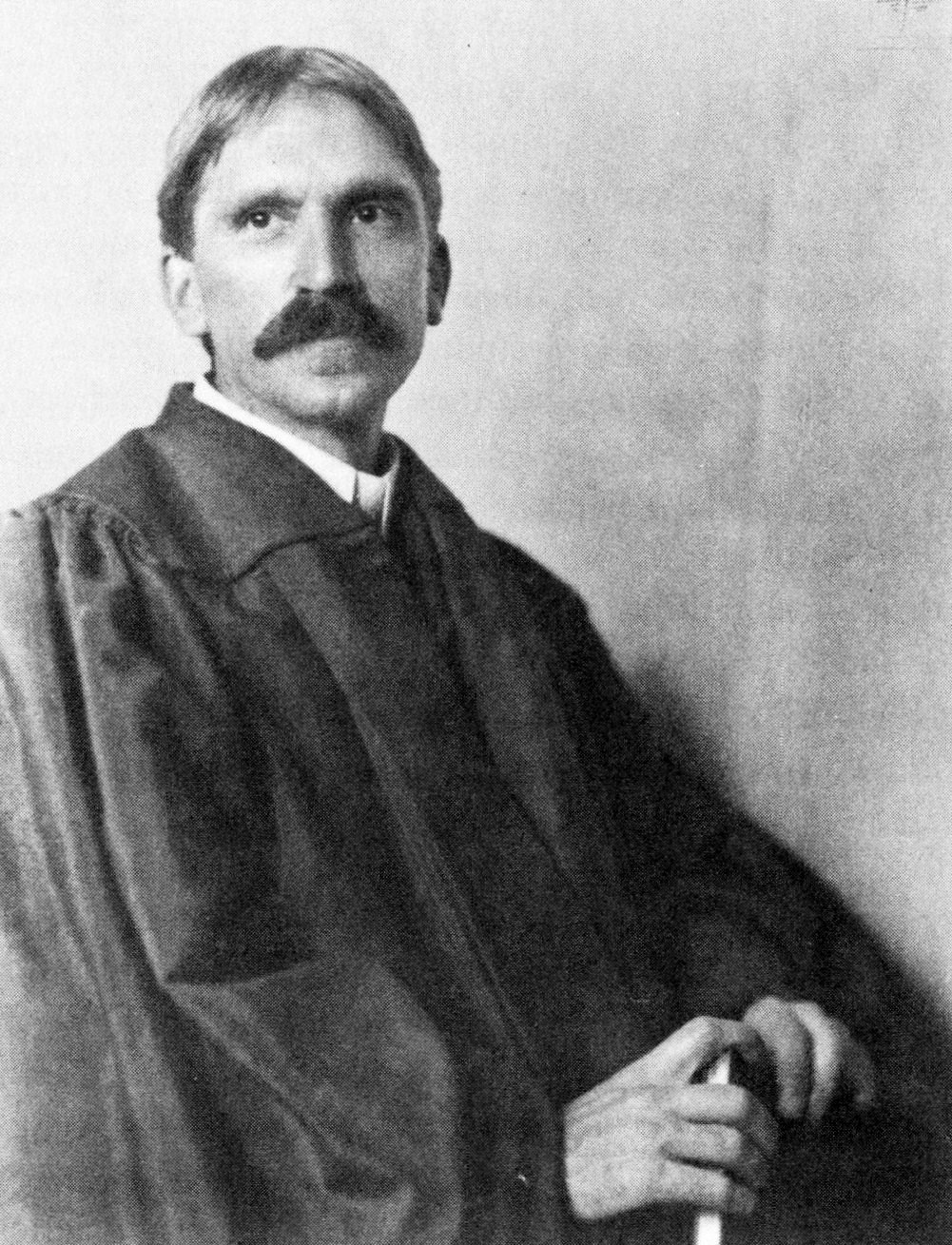
Dewey

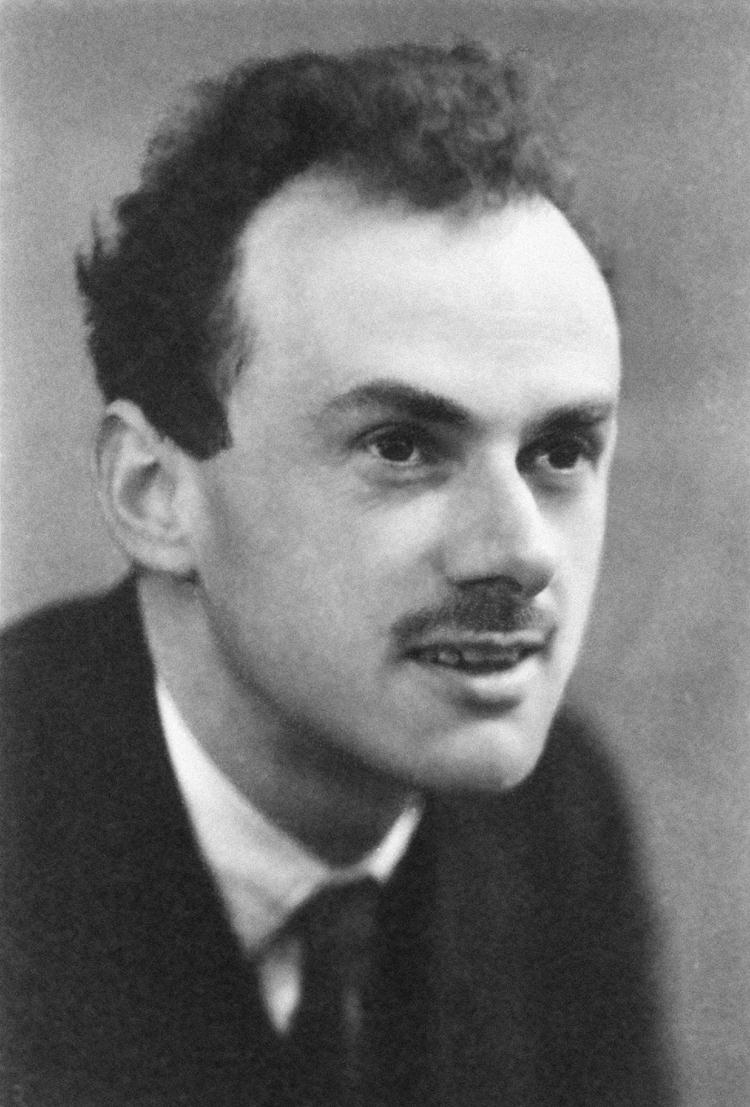
Dirac

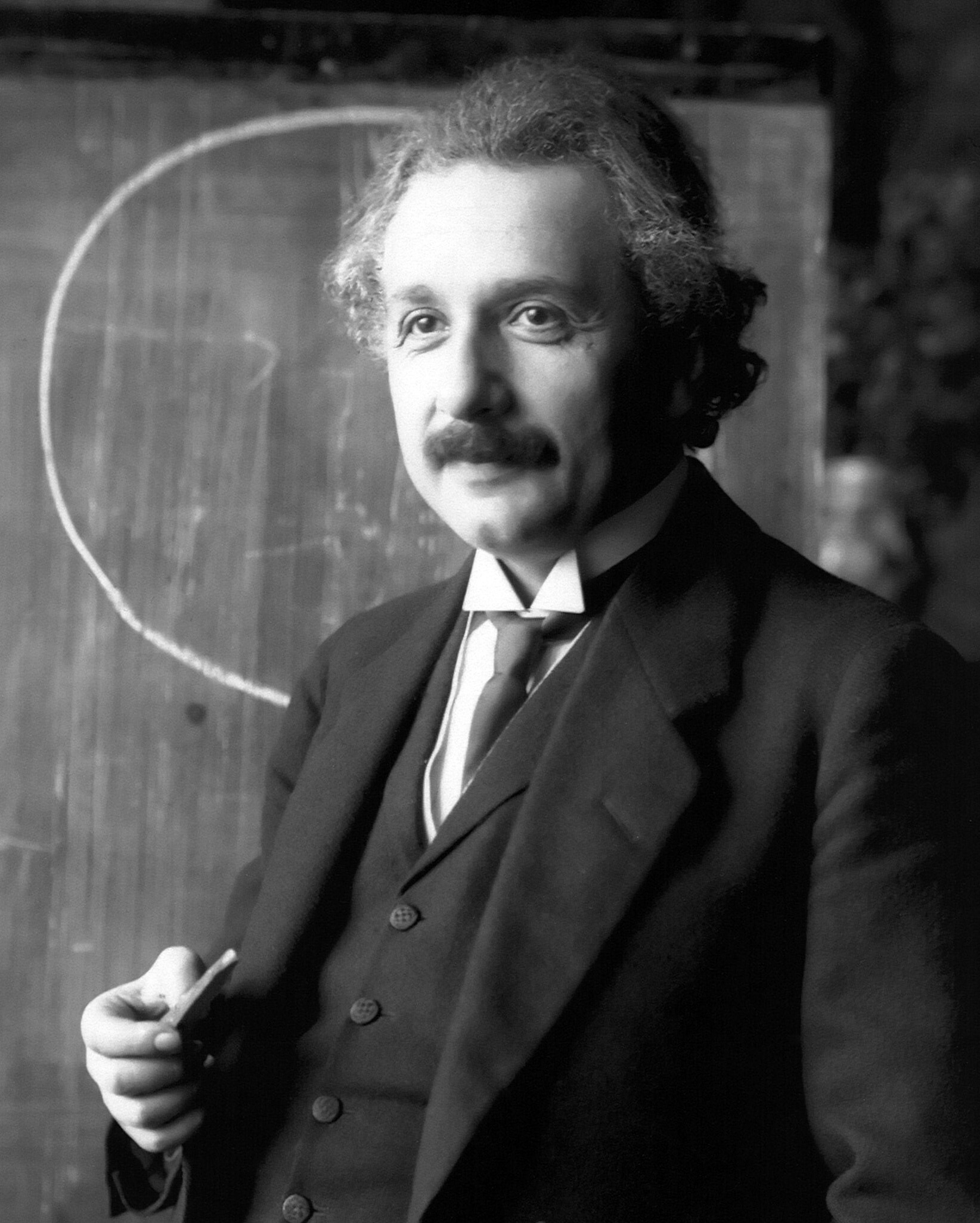
Einstein

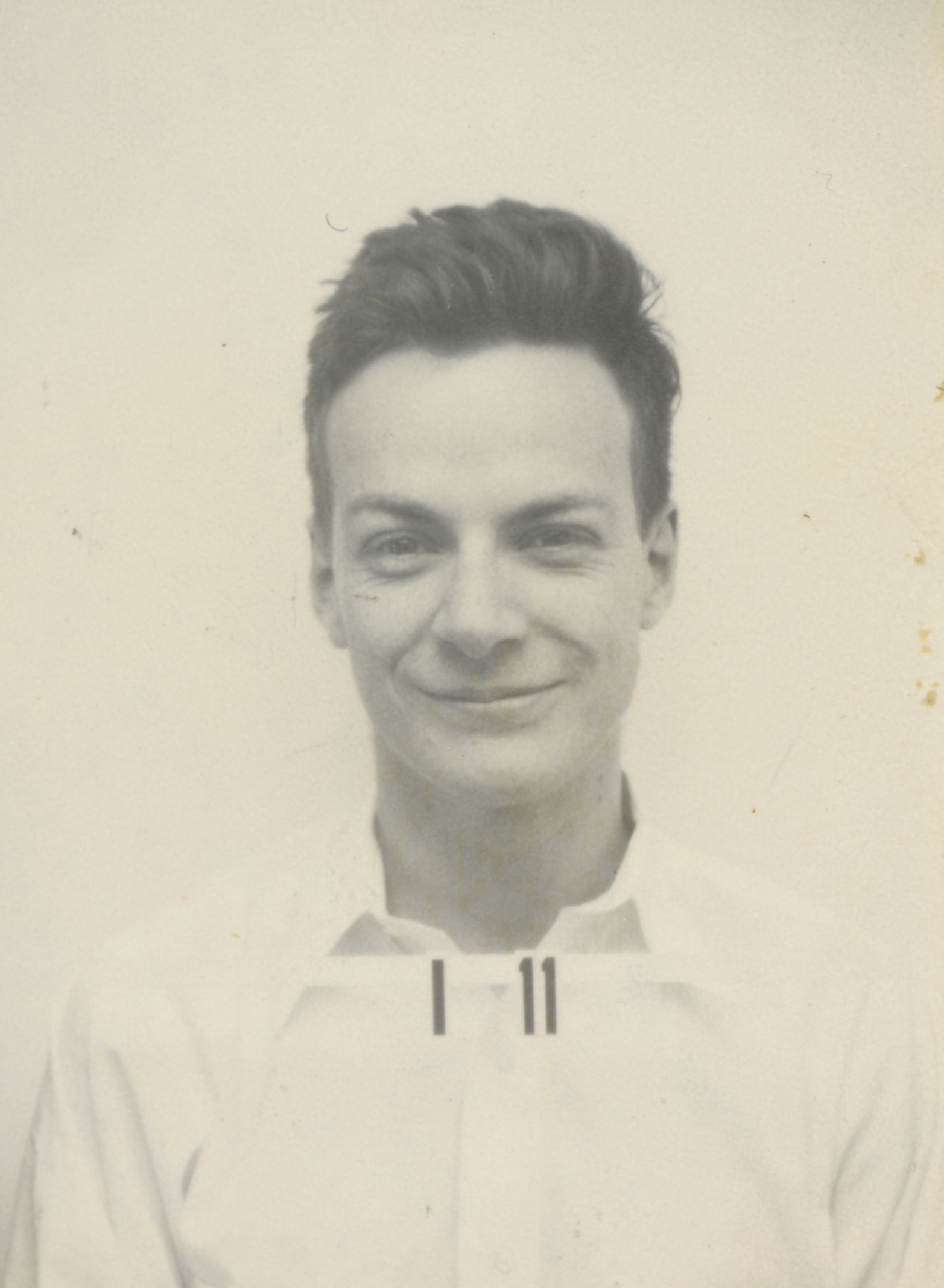
Feynman

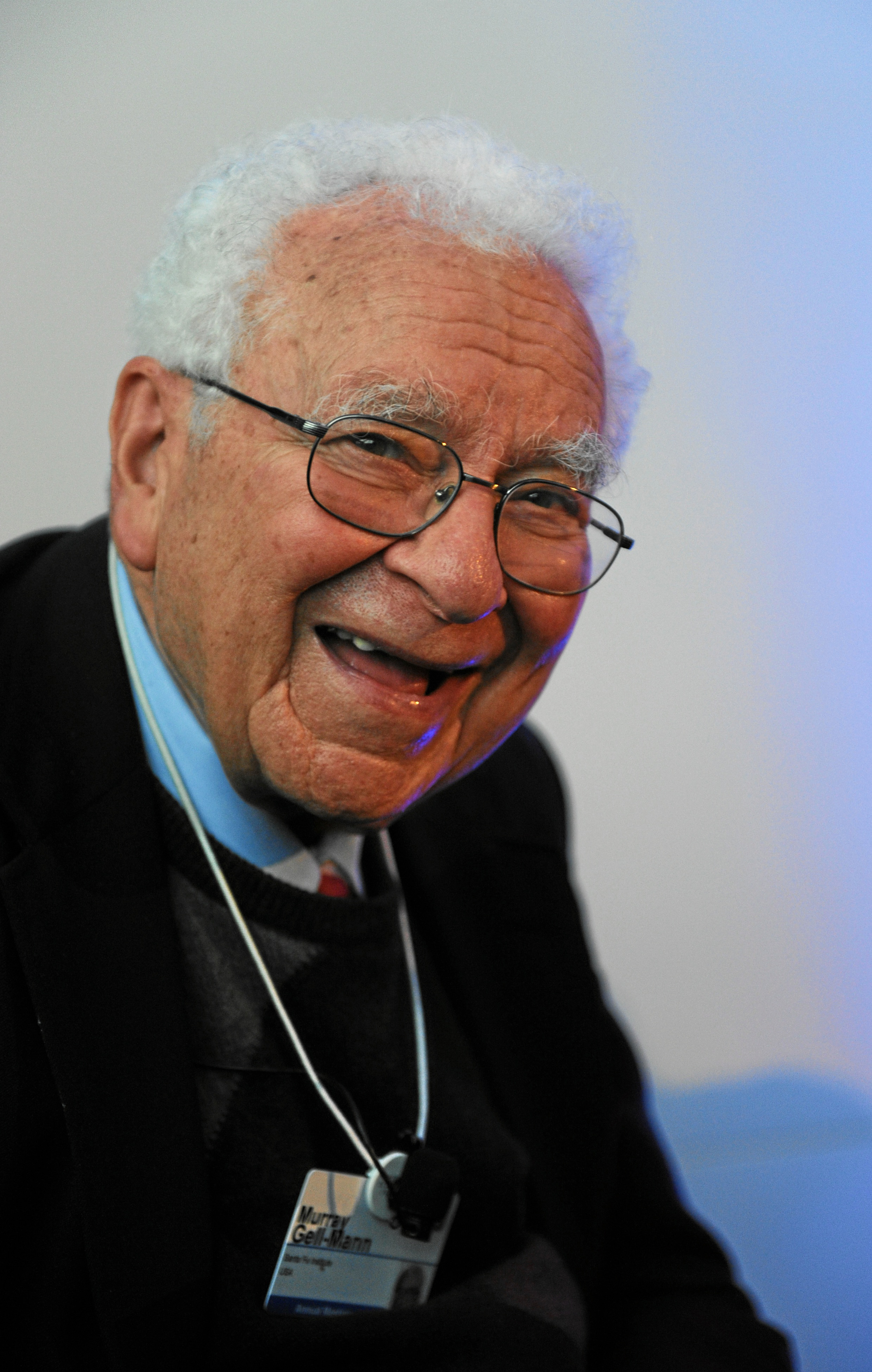
Gell-Mann

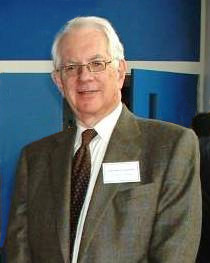
Glashow

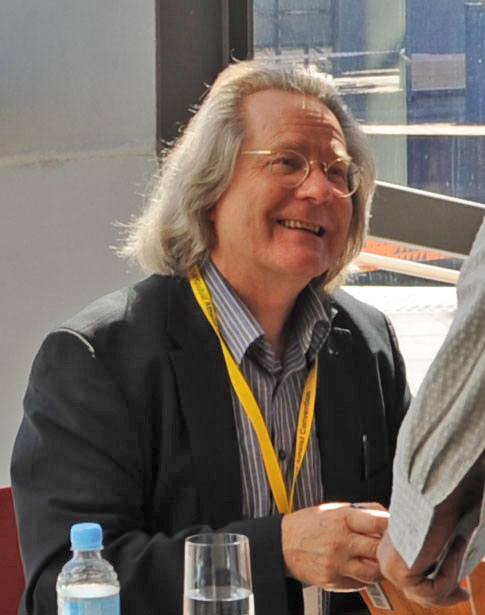
Grayling

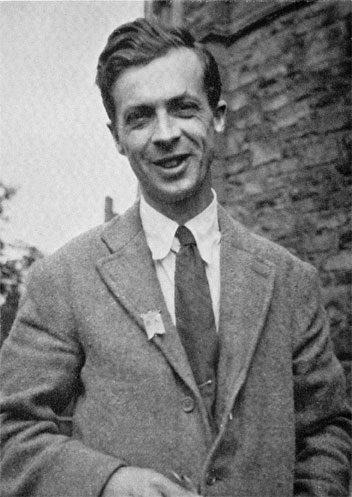
Julian Huxley

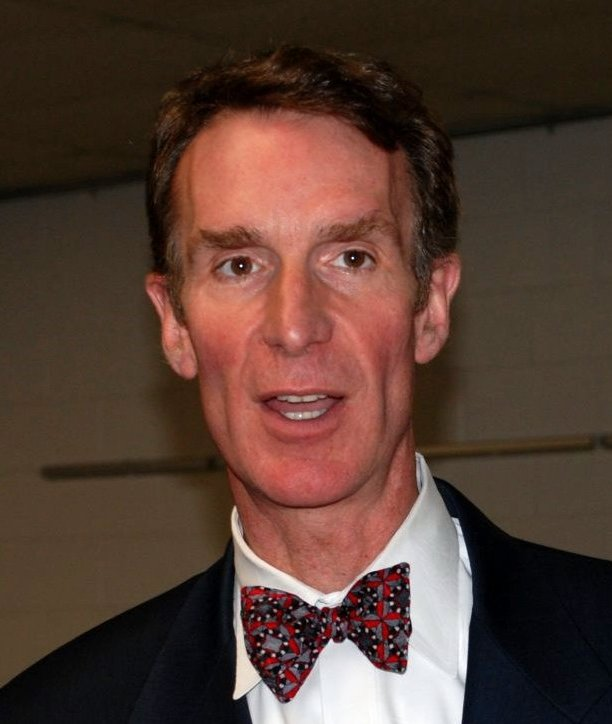
Nye

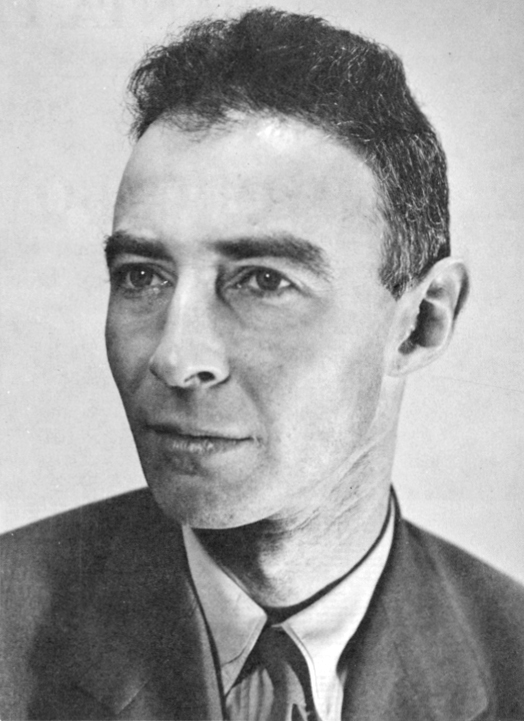
Oppenheimer

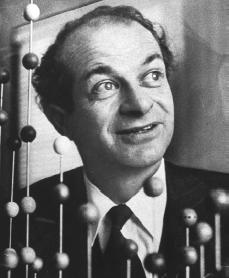
Pauling

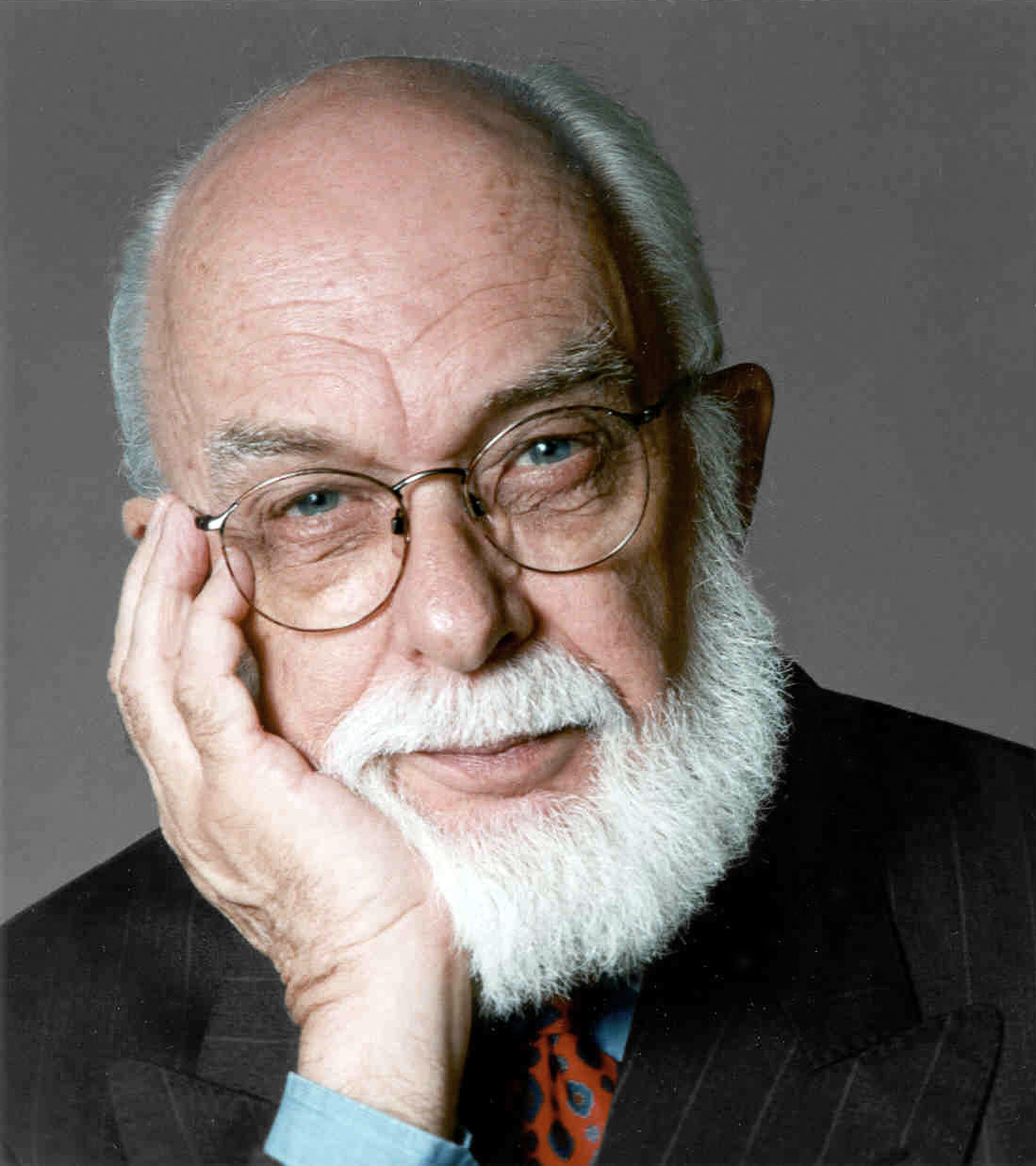
Randi

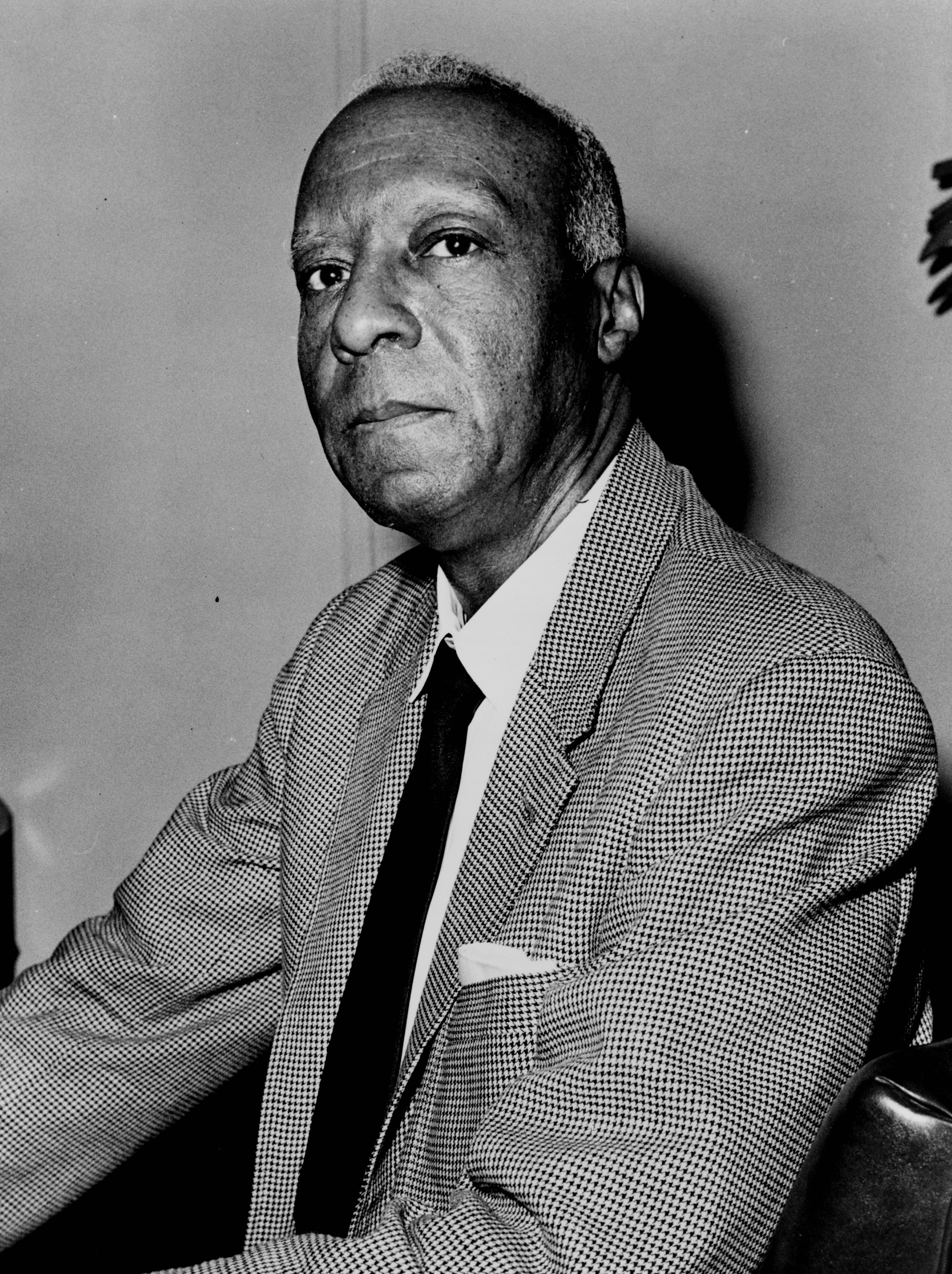
Randolph

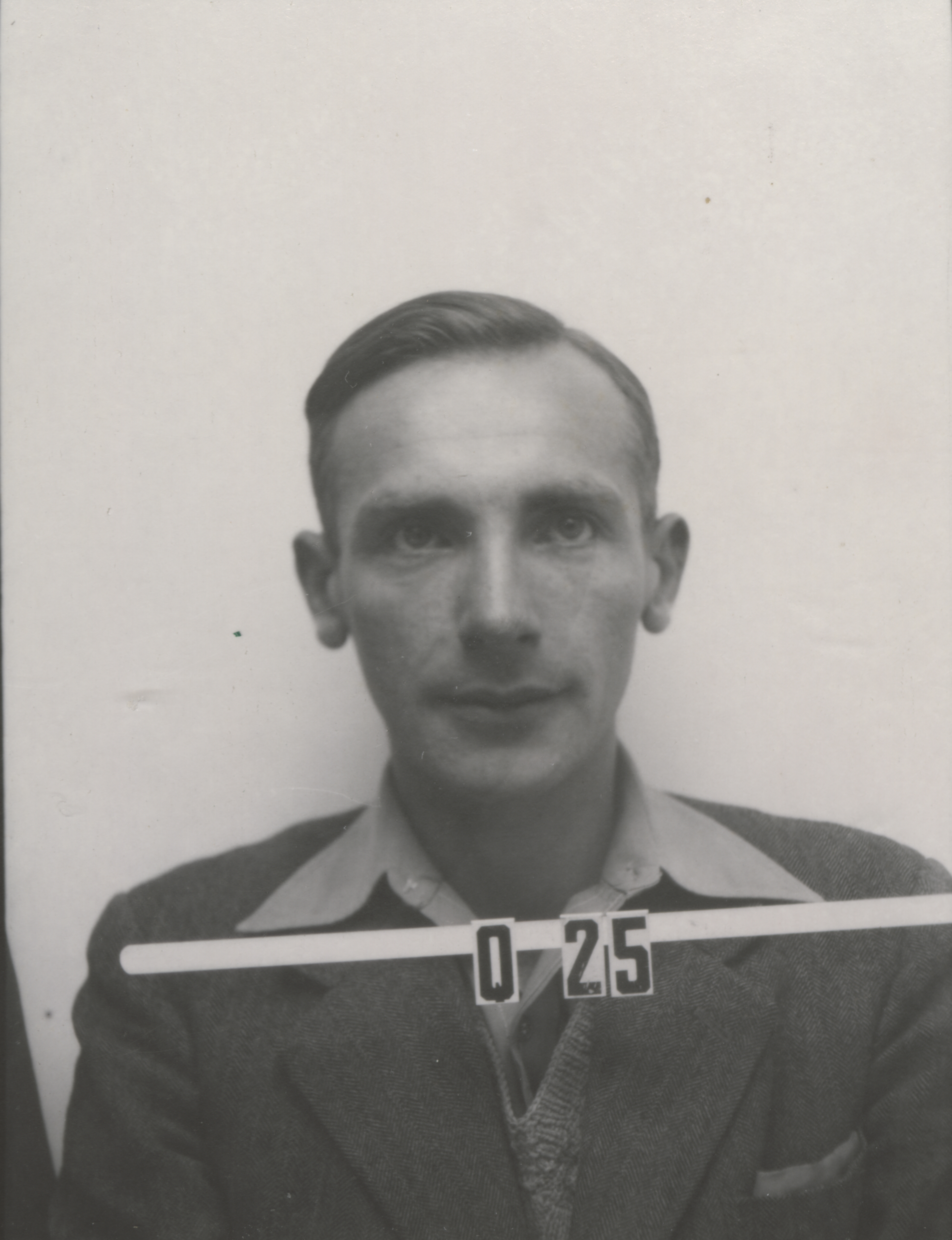
Rotblat

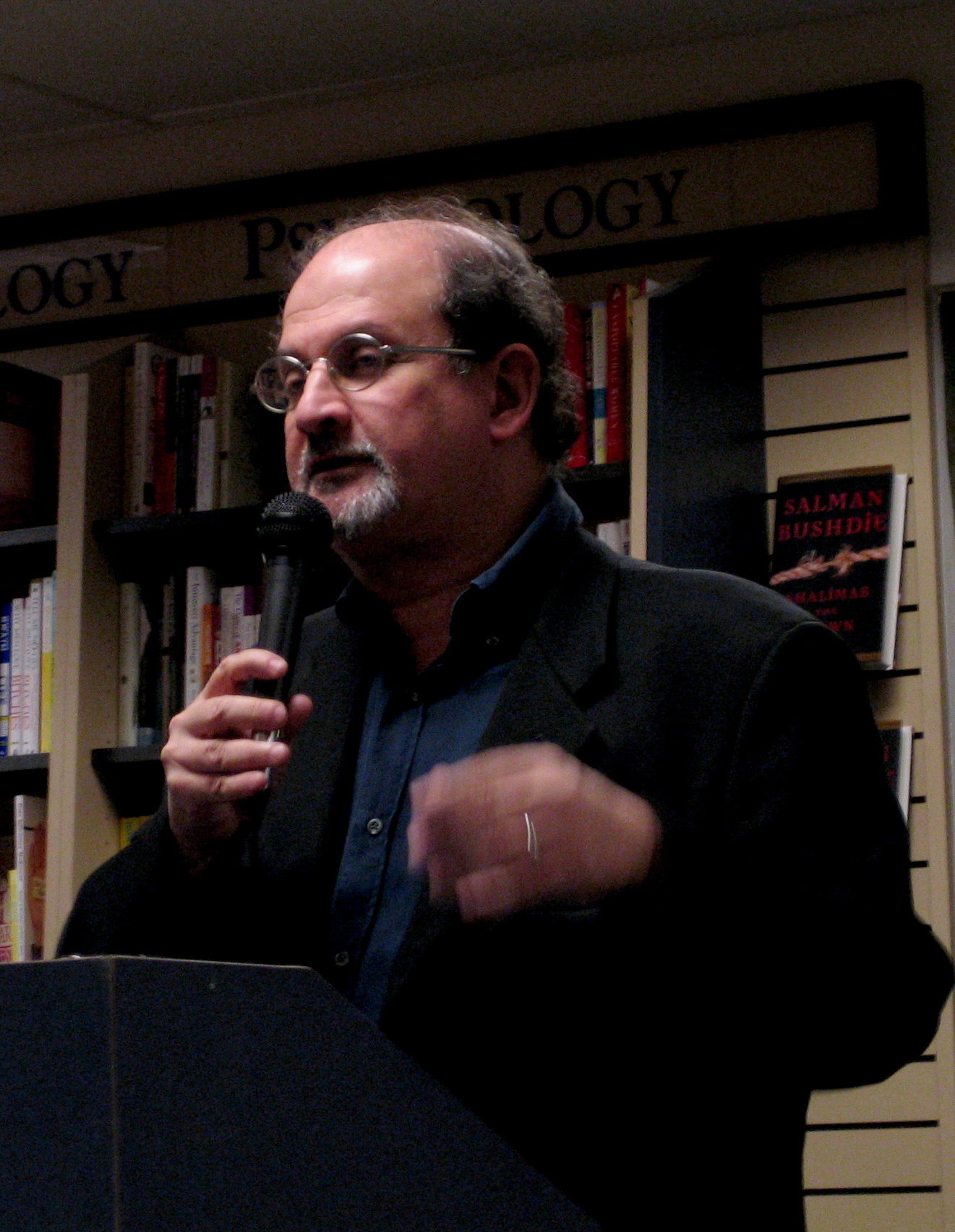
Rushdie

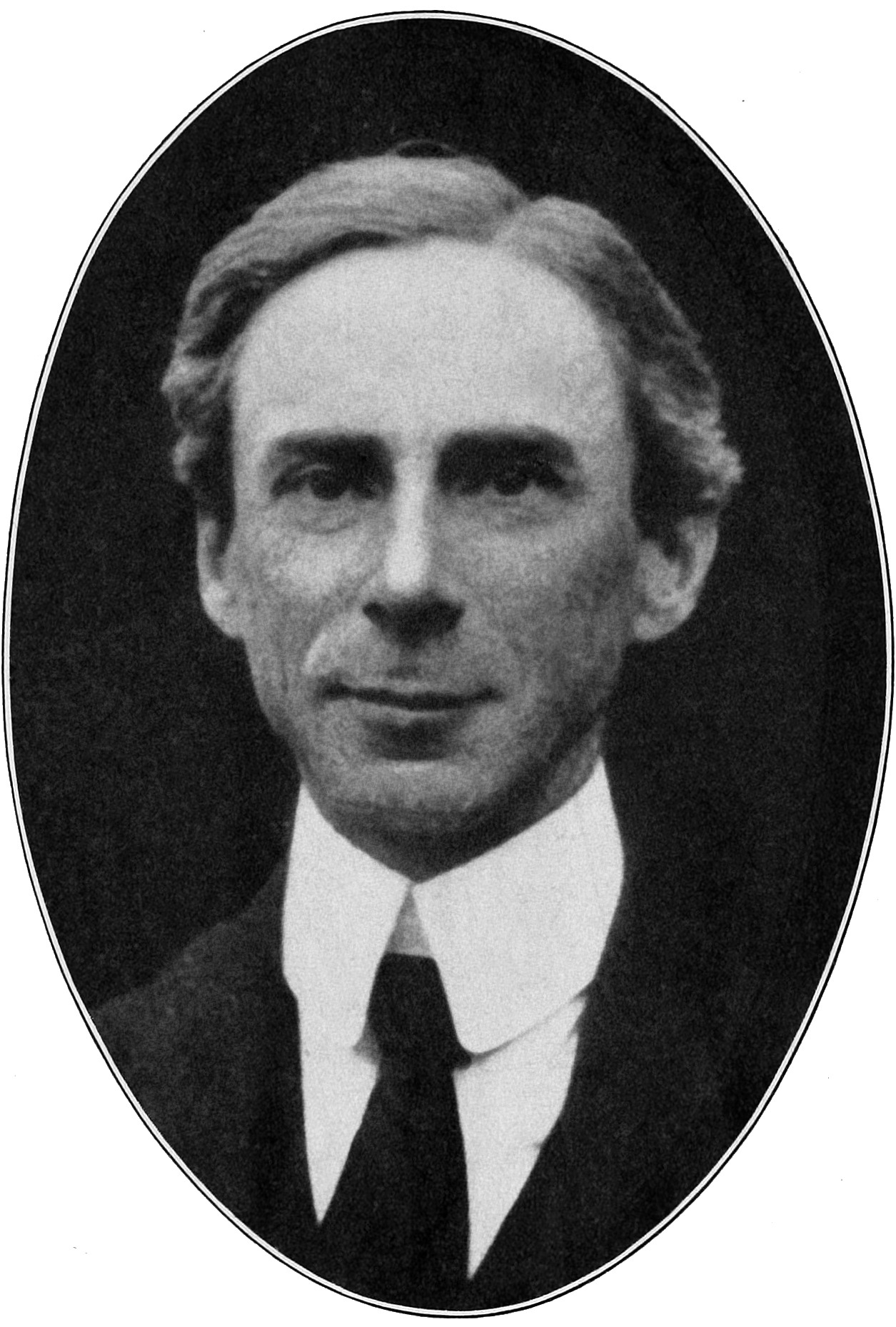
Russell

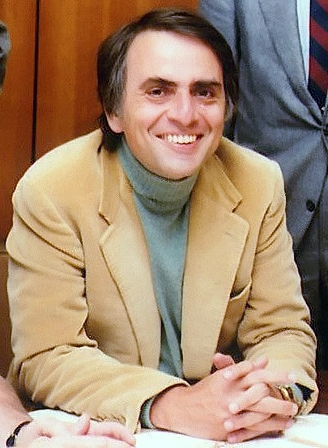
Sagan

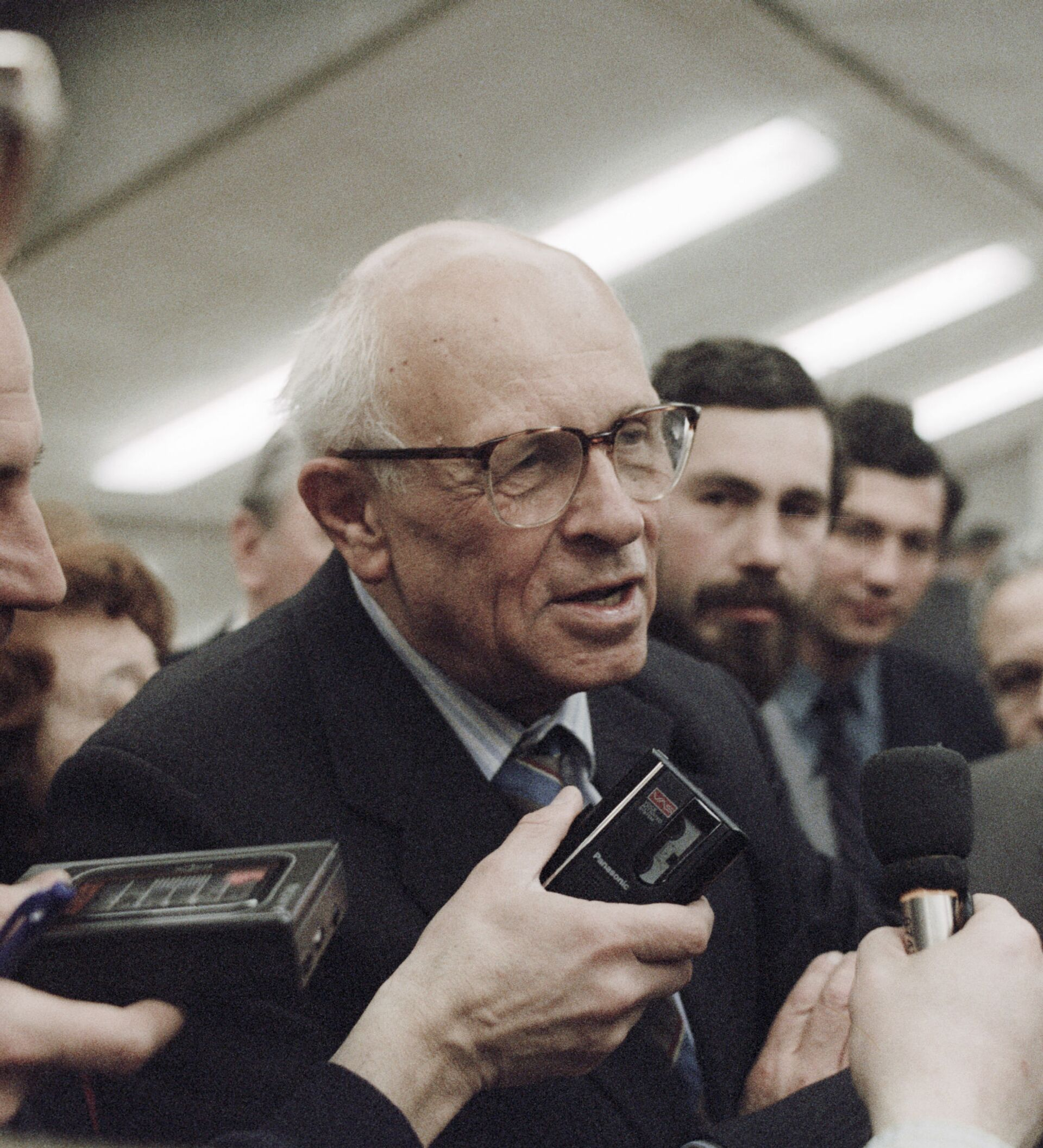
Sakharov

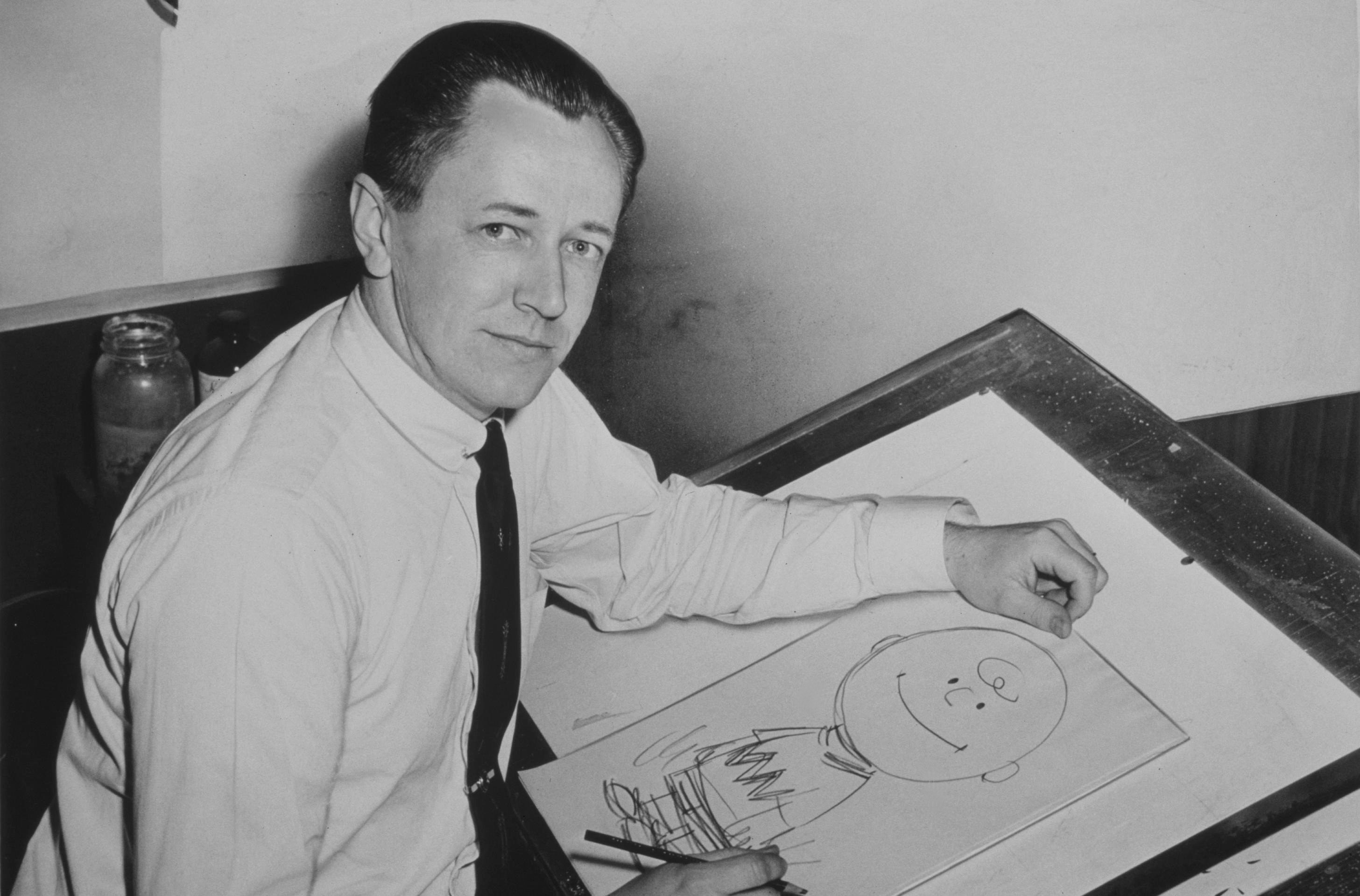
Schulz

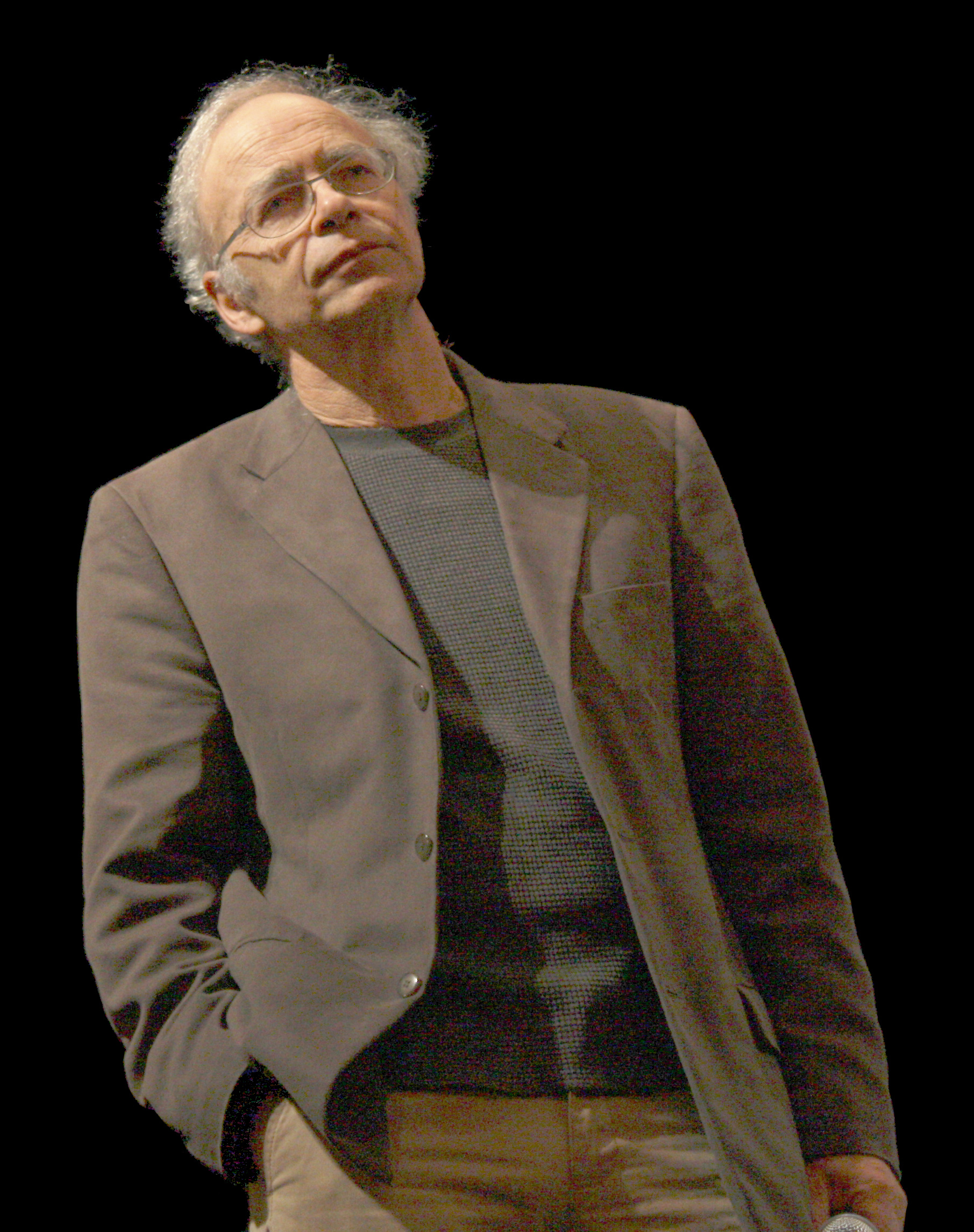
Singer

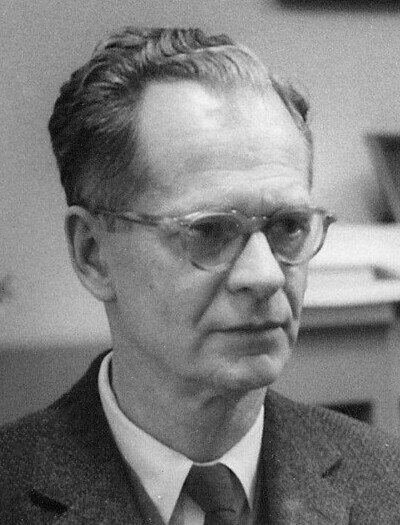
Skinner

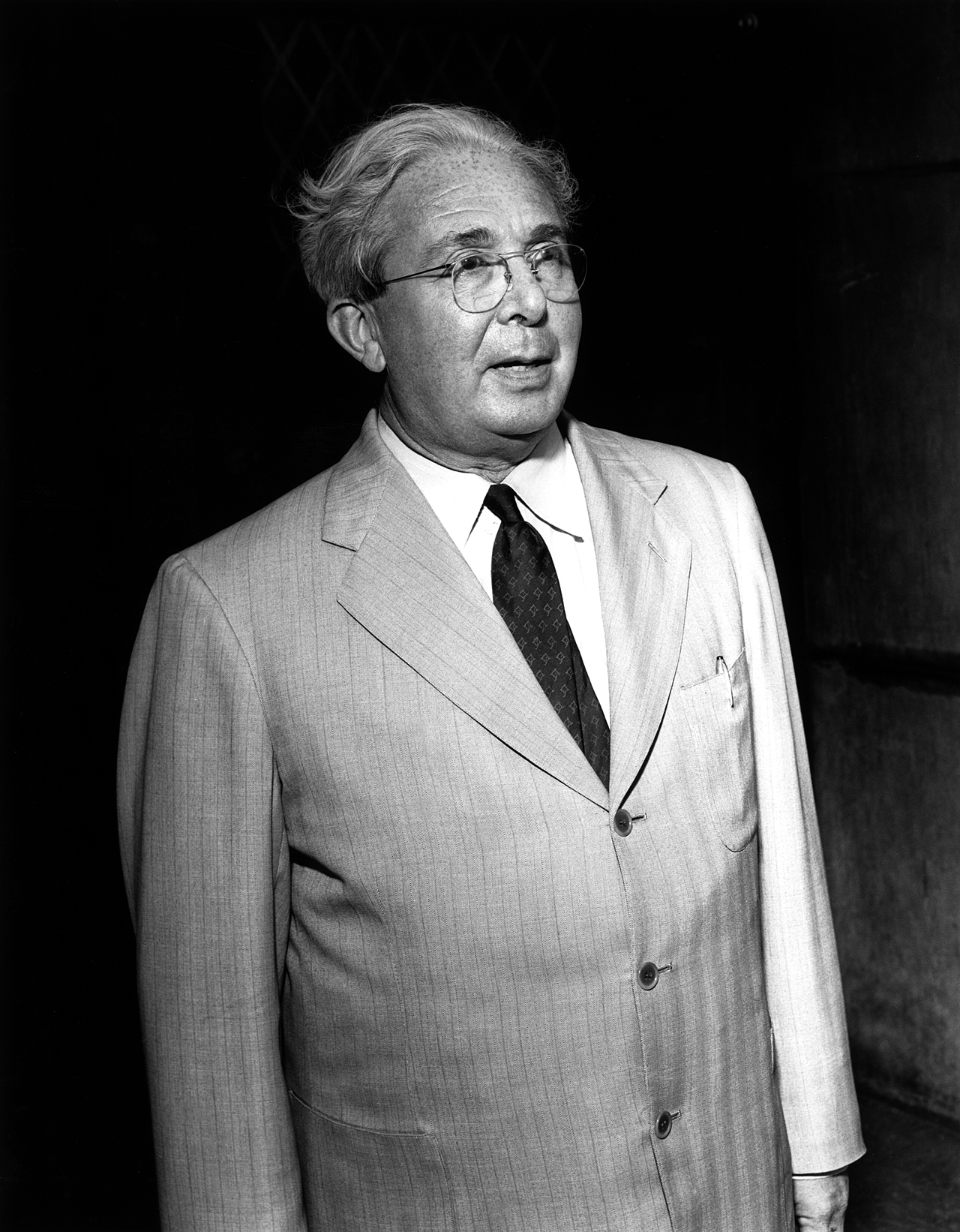
Szilárd

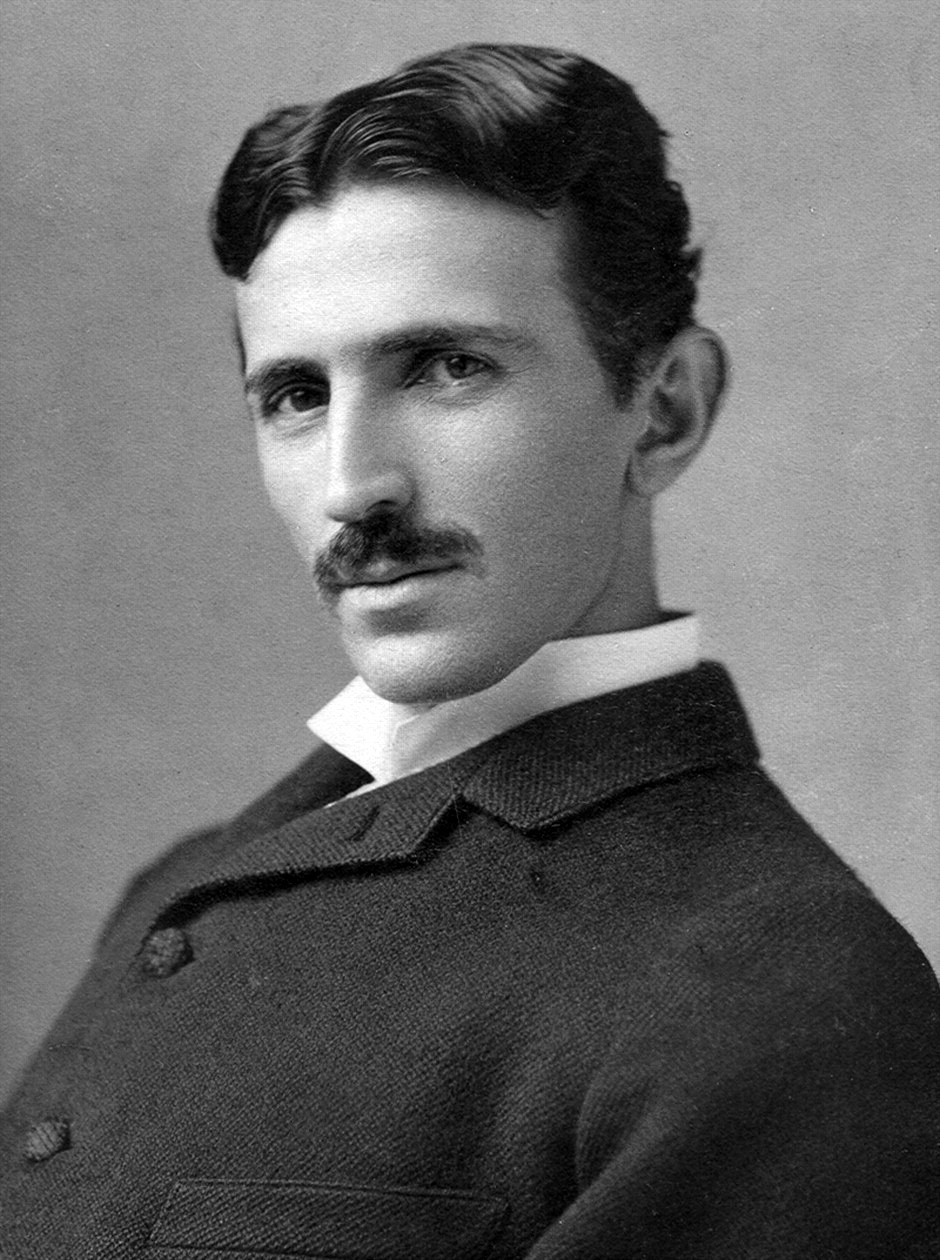
Tesla

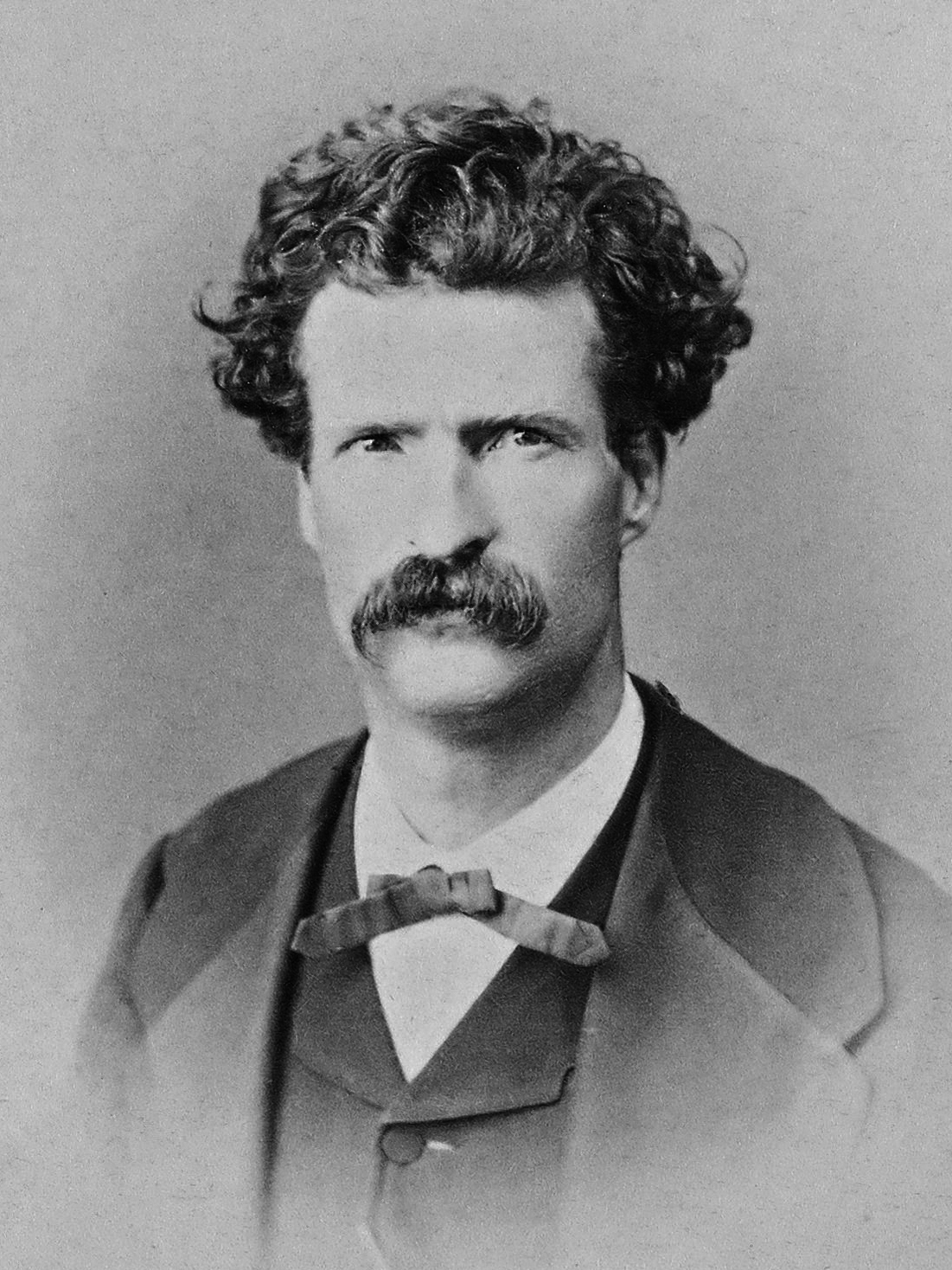
Twain

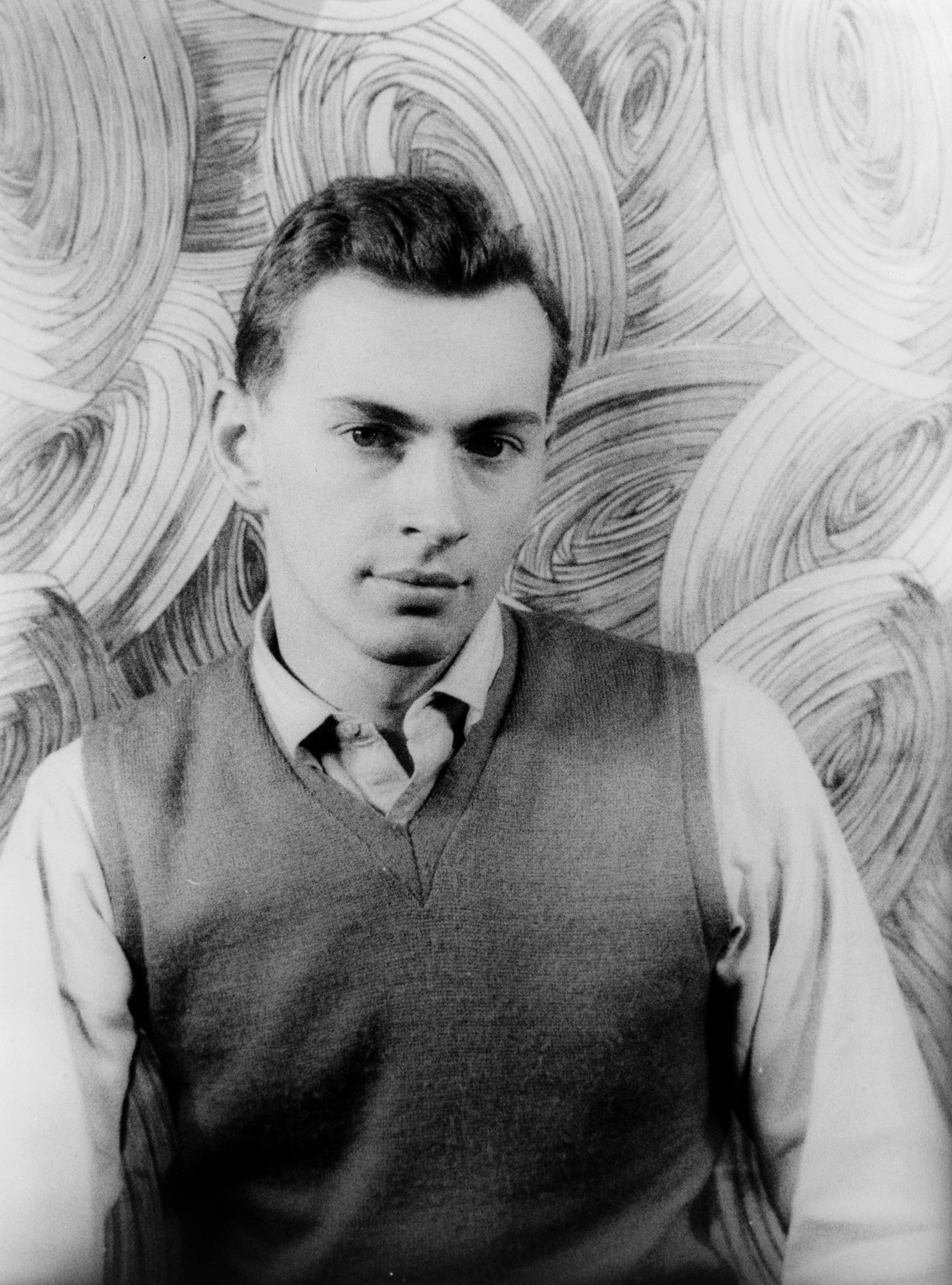
Vidal

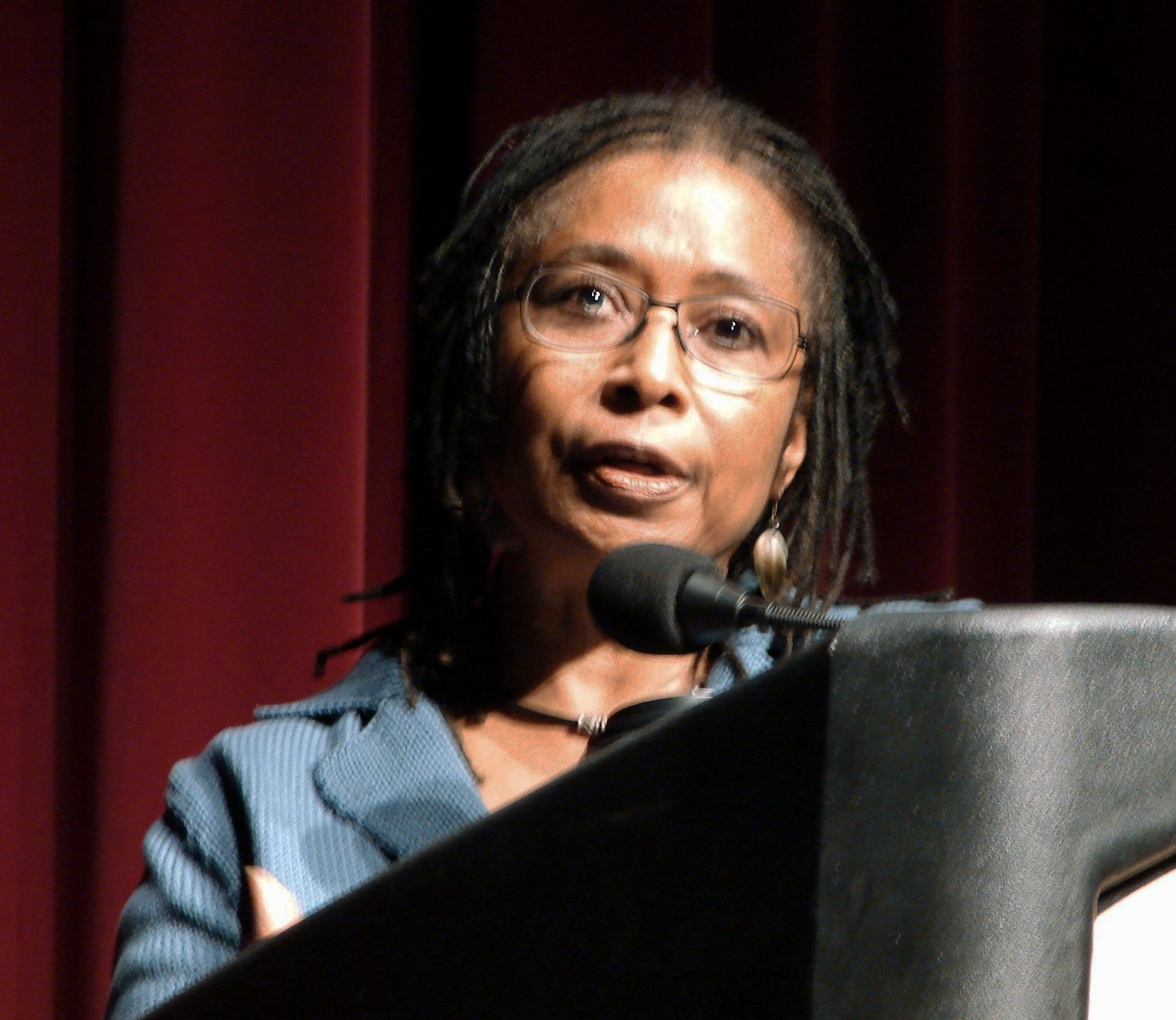
Walker

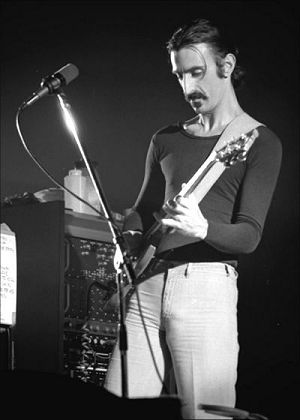
Zappa

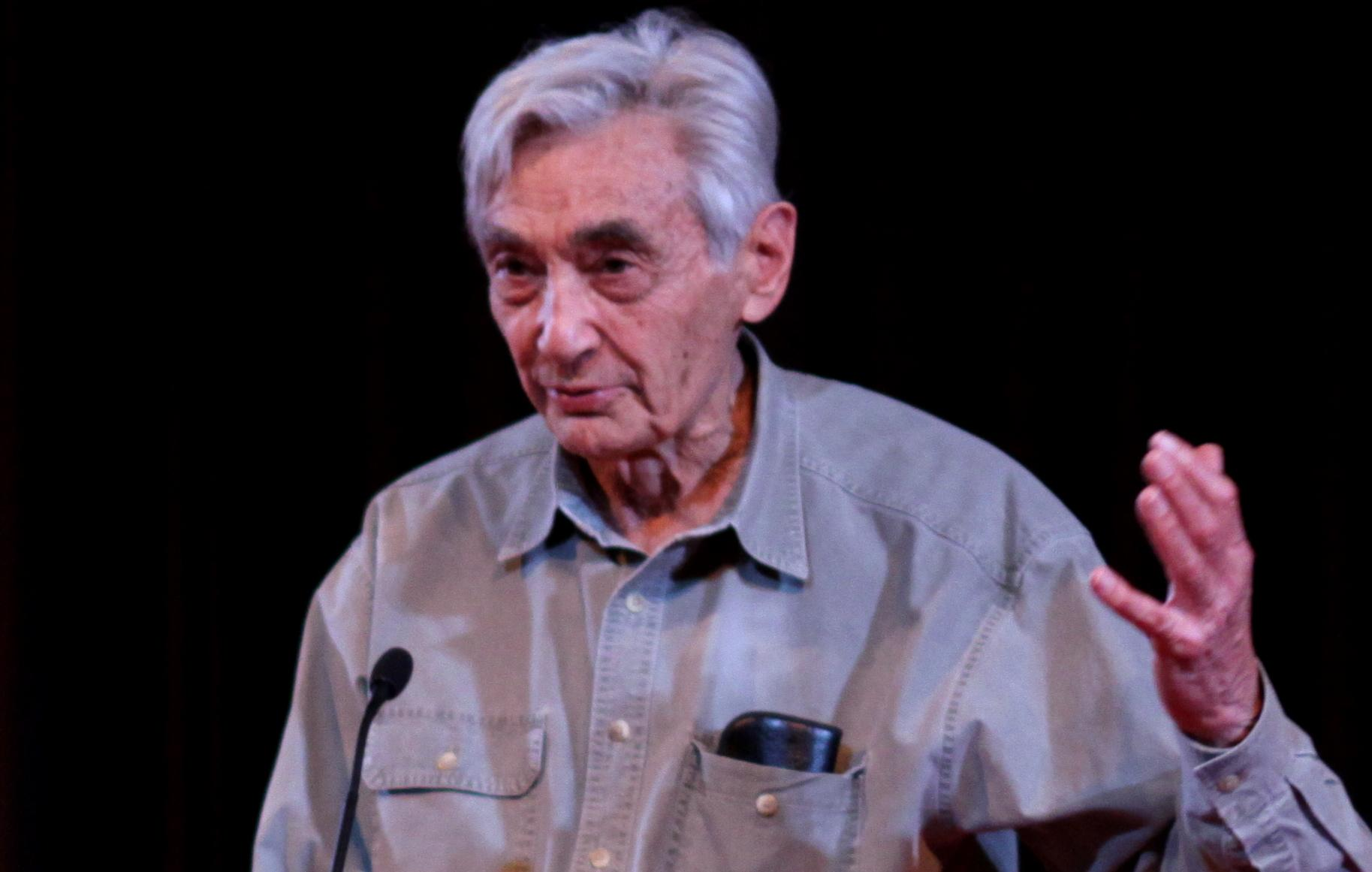
Zinn

- Clark Adams (1969–2007): Former president of the Humanist Association of Las Vegas and Southern Nevada, and a life member of the American Humanist Association.
- Steve Allen: Humanist Laureate in The International Academy of Humanism, and Chairman of the Council for Secular Humanism, and received the Distinguished Service Award from the American Humanist Association.
- Ralph Alpher: American cosmologist. He is famous for the seminal paper on Big Bang nucleosynthesis called the Alpher–Bethe–Gamow paper.
- Philip Warren Anderson: American physicist and Nobel laureate in Physics. Was one of 21 Nobel Laureates who signed the Humanist Manifesto.
- James J. Andrews: American mathematician, a professor of mathematics at Florida State University who specialized in knot theory, topology, and group theory. He was a member for the organization, "African Americans For Humanism" (AAH) Advisory Board.
- John Ankwyll: Considered the first English humanist schoolmaster.
- Isaac Asimov: American Humanist Association's "Humanist of the Year" for 1984, Asimov also served as the organization's president from 1985 until his death in 1992, and was further a Humanist Laureate in the International Academy of Humanism. Taking great personal pride from the association, he became a strong public advocate for the movement.
- Michael Atiyah: British mathematician.
- Margaret Atwood: Canadian author. Named Humanist of the Year in 1987 by the American Humanist Association, and is a Humanist Laureate in the International Academy of Humanism.
- A. J. Ayer: Humanist Laureate in the International Academy of Humanism.
- Jim Al-Khalili: Iraqi-British theoretical physicist and science populariser who became vice president of Humanists UK in 2016 after stepping down as its president.

== B ==
- Ronnie Barker (1929–2005): British comedian.
- Ryan J. Bell (born 1971): Humanist Chaplain at the University of Southern California.
- Jeremy Bentham: English author, jurist, philosopher, and legal and social reformer. He became a leading theorist in Anglo-American philosophy of law, and a political radical whose ideas influenced the development of welfarism. He is best known for his advocacy of utilitarianism and animal rights, and the idea of the panopticon.
- John Bercow: British politician.
- Maria Berenice Dias: Progressive Brazilian judge and the first woman to take the bench in her home Brazilian state of Rio Grande do Sul.
- Marshall Berman: American political scientist and Marxist humanist.
- Leonard Bernstein: American composer, conductor, author, music lecturer, and pianist. He was among the first conductors born and educated in the United States of America to receive worldwide acclaim.
- Nye Bevan: Welsh MP and Labour Minister of Health who created the National Health Service in the UK.
- Niels Bohr: Danish physicist who made foundational contributions to understanding atomic structure and quantum mechanics, for which he received the Nobel Prize in Physics in 1922.
- Hermann Bondi: Humanist Laureate in the International Academy of Humanism.
- Paul D. Boyer: American biochemist, analytical chemist, and a professor of chemistry at University of California Los Angeles (UCLA). He shared the 1997 Nobel Prize in Chemistry for research on the "enzymatic mechanism underlying the biosynthesis of adenosine triphosphate (ATP)" (ATP synthase) with John E. Walker; the remainder of the Prize in that year was awarded to Danish chemist Jens Christian Skou for his discovery of the Na+/K+-ATPase. Was one of 21 Nobel Laureates who signed the Humanist Manifesto.
- Johannes Brahms (1833–1897): German composer and pianist.
- Jacob Bronowski: Polish-British polymath and author of The Ascent of Man.
- Lester R. Brown: American environmental analyst, founder of the Worldwatch Institute, and founder and president of the Earth Policy Institute, a nonprofit research organization based in Washington, D.C. Named Humanist of the Year in 1991 by the American Humanist Association.
- Roy W. Brown: British-born engineer, humanist and human rights activist; president of the International Humanist and Ethical Union 2003–2006 and its main representative at the United Nations.
- Mario Bunge: Argentine philosopher, philosopher of science and physicist mainly active in Canada.

== C ==
- Mary Calderone: American physician and a public health advocate for sexual education. She served as president and co-founder of the Sex Information and Education Council of the United States (SIECUS) from 1954 to 1982. Selected as one of the Humanists of the Year in 1974 by the American Humanist Association.
- Helen Caldicott: Australian physician, author, and anti-nuclear advocate who founded several associations dedicated to opposing the use of nuclear power, depleted uranium munitions, nuclear weapons, nuclear weapons proliferation, war and military action in general. Named Humanist of the Year in 1982 by the American Humanist Association.
- Anton J. Carlson: A signer of the original Humanist Manifesto, and named Humanist of the Year in 1953 by the American Humanist Association.
- Owen Chamberlain: American physicist and Nobel laureate in Physics; one of 21 Nobel Laureates who signed the Humanist Manifesto.
- Charlie Chaplin: Stated in his autobiography that he was a humanist and used this as his argument in his defence of J. Edgar Hoover's insistence that Chaplin was a communist.
- Noam Chomsky: American linguist, philosopher, cognitive scientist, historian, and activist.
- Arthur C. Clarke: Humanist Laureate in the International Academy of Humanism.
- Auguste Comte: French philosopher; a founder of the discipline of sociology and of the doctrine of positivism.
- Aaron Copland: American composer
- Andrew Copson: Chief Executive of Humanists UK and President of the International Humanist and Ethical Union.
- Brian Cox: British particle physicist, Royal Society University Research Fellow and television personality.
- Francis Crick: Humanist Laureate in the International Academy of Humanism, and received the Distinguished Service Award from the American Humanist Association in 1986.
- Paul J. Crutzen: Dutch Nobel Prize–winning atmospheric chemist; one of 21 Nobel Laureates who signed the Humanist Manifesto.

== D ==
- Richard Dawkins: Named Humanist of the Year in 1996 by the American Humanist Association and by Humanists UK in 2012, and is a Humanist Laureate in the International Academy of Humanism.
- Daniel Dennett: Named Humanist of the Year in 2004 by the American Humanist Association, and is a Humanist Laureate in the International Academy of Humanism.
- Johann Deisenhofer: German biochemist who, along with Hartmut Michel and Robert Huber, received the Nobel Prize for Chemistry in 1988 for their determination of the first crystal structure of an integral membrane protein, a membrane-bound complex of proteins and co-factors that is essential to photosynthesis. Was one of 21 Nobel Laureates who signed the Humanist Manifesto.
- John Dewey: Signer of the original Humanist Manifesto. In 1954, the American Humanist Association named Dewey a Humanist Pioneer.
- John H. Dietrich: Signer of the original Humanist Manifesto, and was named a Humanist Pioneer by the American Humanist Association in 1976.
- Matt Dillahunty: Regularly engages in debates with theists, former president of the Atheist Community of Austin, and former host of The Atheist Experience. He is currently a frequent host of The Line.
- Paul Dirac: English theoretical physicist who made fundamental contributions to the early development of both quantum mechanics and quantum electrodynamics. He shared the Nobel Prize in Physics, in 1933, with Erwin Schrödinger, "for the discovery of new productive forms of atomic theory."
- Alf Dubs, Baron Dubs: Czech-born British peer and former MP, awarded Humanist of the Year by the British Humanist Association in 2016.
- Ann Dunham (1942–1995): Mother of Barack Obama, the 44th President of the United States.

== E ==
- Roger Ebert: American journalist, film critic, and screenwriter.
- Umberto Eco: Humanist Laureate in the International Academy of Humanism.
- Sanal Edamaruku: Indian author and rationalist.
- Sonja Eggerickx: Belgian secular Humanist, president of the International Humanist and Ethical Union 2006–2015; awarded the Distinguished Services to Humanism Award 2016 for her work in secular education and ethics.
- Albert Einstein: Served on the advisory board of the First Humanist Society of New York
- Barbara Ehrenreich: American feminist, democratic socialist, and political activist; named Humanist of the Year in 1998 by the American Humanist Association.
- George Eliot: pen name of Mary Ann Evans, English writer and intellectual, author of Middlemarch and many other novels; and translator of highly sceptical studies David Friedrich Strauss's Life of Jesus and Feuerbach's The Essence of Christianity; was influenced by these and Comte
- Albert Ellis: American psychologist who in 1955 developed Rational Emotive Behavior Therapy (REBT); named Humanist of the Year in 1971 by the American Humanist Association.
- Friedrich Engels: German-English industrialist, social scientist, author, political theorist, philosopher, and father of Marxist theory, alongside Karl Marx.
- Greg M. Epstein: Secular humanist chaplain at Harvard University, and a published author on the subject of secular humanism.

== F ==
- Richard Feynman: American physicist known for his work in the path integral formulation of quantum mechanics, the theory of quantum electrodynamics, and the physics of the superfluidity of supercooled liquid helium, as well as in particle physics (he proposed the parton model). For his contributions to the development of quantum electrodynamics, Feynman, jointly with Julian Schwinger and Sin-Itiro Tomonaga, received the Nobel Prize in Physics in 1965.
- Joseph Fletcher: American professor who founded the theory of situational ethics in the 1960s, and was a pioneer in the field of bioethics. Fletcher was a leading academic involved in the topics of abortion, infanticide, euthanasia, eugenics, and cloning; named Humanist of the Year in 1974 by the American Humanist Association.
- Tom Flynn: Senior Editor of Free Inquiry magazine.
- Joseph Fourier: French mathematician and physicist best known for initiating the investigation of Fourier series and their applications to problems of heat transfer and vibrations. The Fourier transform and Fourier's law are also named in his honour. Fourier is also generally credited with the discovery of the greenhouse effect.
- Levi Fragell: Norwegian humanist, chairman and secretary of the Norwegian Humanist Association, President of the International Humanist and Ethical Union (IHEU) between 1987 and 1990 (as one member of a troika) and, in his own right, between 1998 and 2003.
- Sigmund Freud: Austrian neurologist who founded the discipline of psychoanalysis.
- Betty Friedan: American writer, activist, and feminist. A leading figure in the Women's Movement in the United States, her 1963 book The Feminine Mystique is often credited with sparking the "second wave" of American feminism in the 20th century. Named Humanist of the Year in 1975 by the American Humanist Association.
- Jerome Isaac Friedman: American physicist and Nobel laureate in Physics; was one of 21 Nobel Laureates who signed the Humanist Manifesto.
- Stephen Fry: British Humanist Association welcomed the author, comedian, presenter, and director Stephen Fry to its membership and as a Distinguished Supporter of Humanism.
- R. Buckminster Fuller: American systems theorist, architect, engineer, author, designer, inventor, and futurist; named Humanist of the Year in 1969 by the American Humanist Association.

== G ==
- John Kenneth Galbraith: Canadian-American economist. He was a Keynesian and an institutionalist, a leading proponent of 20th-century American liberalism. Named Humanist of the Year in 1985 by the American Humanist Association.
- Murray Gell-Mann: Humanist of the Year in 2005 by the American Humanist Association, and is a Humanist Laureate in the International Academy of Humanism,
- Pierre-Gilles de Gennes: French physicist and the Nobel Prize laureate in Physics in 1991; notable signer of the Humanist Manifesto III.
- Sheldon Glashow: Nobel Prize-winning American theoretical physicist. He is the Metcalf Professor of Mathematics and Physics at Boston University and Higgins Professor of Physics, Emeritus, at Harvard University. Notable Signer of the Humanist Manifesto III.
- Rebecca Goldstein: American novelist and professor of philosophy; named Humanist of the Year in 2011 by the American Humanist Association.
- Stephen Jay Gould: Humanist Laureate in the International Academy of Humanism. He was awarded the Distinguished Service honor in 1984 and was named Humanist of the Year in 2001, both by the American Humanist Association.
- A.C. Grayling: Prominent British philosopher, author of The Good Book: A Humanist Bible
- David Gross: American particle physicist and string theorist. Along with Frank Wilczek and David Politzer, he was awarded the 2004 Nobel Prize in Physics for their discovery of asymptotic freedom; one of 21 Nobel Laureates who signed the Humanist Manifesto.
- Greg Graffin: Professor at UCLA, author and singer in American punk rock band Bad Religion. In 2008, the American Humanist Association presented him with the Outstanding Lifetime Achievement Award in Cultural Humanism.
- Goparaju Ramachandra Rao: Proposed positive atheism; atheist thinker and social reformer from India.

== H ==
- Daniel Handler (born 1970): American author better known under the pen name of Lemony Snicket. Handler calls himself an atheist and a secular humanist.
- Sam Harris (born 1967): American author, philosopher, and neuroscientist.
- Hubert Harrison: West Indian-American writer, orator, educator, critic, and radical socialist political activist based in Harlem, New York. He was described by activist A. Philip Randolph as “the father of Harlem radicalism” and by the historian Joel Augustus Rogers as “the foremost Afro-American intellect of his time.” John G. Jackson of American Atheists described him as "The Black Socrates".
- Herbert A. Hauptman: American mathematician and Nobel laureate in Chemistry. Was one of 21 Nobel Laureates who signed the Humanist Manifesto. In 2006, the American Humanist Association presented Hauptman with the Isaac Asimov Science Award.
- Stephen Hawking: Theoretical physicist, cosmologist, and author, Lucasian Professor of Mathematics at the University of Cambridge 1979–2009, and director of research at the Centre for Theoretical Cosmology at the University of Cambridge.
- Bill Hayden (1933–2023): Governor-General of Australia (1989–1996).
- Sam Heads: British entomologist, palaeontologist and secular humanist.
- Katharine Hepburn: Presented the Humanist Arts Award in 1985 by the American Humanist Association.
- Dudley R. Herschbach: American chemist and Nobel laureate in Chemistry. Was one of 21 Nobel Laureates who signed the Humanist Manifesto.
- Bill Hicks (1961–1994): American stand-up comedian and musician.
- Christopher Hitchens (1949–2011): English American author and journalist.
- Pervez Hoodbhoy: Pakistani nuclear physicist, essayist and defence analyst. Notable Signer of the Humanist Manifesto III.
- Julian Huxley: Self-described "scientific humanist," and presided over the founding congress of the International Humanist and Ethical Union. He was named Humanist of the Year by the American Humanist Association in 1962.
- Martin Hägglund: Swedish philosopher and scholar of modernist literature. Articulates his theory of existential, secular humanism based on his readings of Jacques Derrida, Georg Wilhelm Friedrich Hegel, Martin Heidegger and more in his book This Life: Secular Faith and Spiritual Freedom.

== J ==
- Albert Jacquard: French geneticist and essayist.
- Penn Jillette: American illusionist, comedian, musician, and best-selling author known for his work with fellow magician Teller in the team Penn & Teller, and advocacy of atheism, scientific skepticism, libertarianism and free market capitalism.
- Jerry Coyne: American evolutionary biologist and author.

== K ==
- Jack Kevorkian: Presented with the Humanist Hero Award in 1994 by the American Humanist Association.
- Harry Kroto: English chemist who shared the 1996 Nobel Prize in Chemistry with Robert Curl and Richard Smalley. Kroto is the Francis Eppes Professor of Chemistry at the Florida State University, which he joined in 2004. Was one of 21 Nobel Laureates who signed the Humanist Manifesto.
- Margaret E. Kuhn: American activist known for founding the Gray Panthers movement in August 1970. Named Humanist of the Year in 1978 by the American Humanist Association.
- Paul Kurtz: Co-wrote the Humanist Manifesto, Version II. Named a Humanist Fellow in 1974 and given the Humanist Lifetime Achievement Award in 2007, both by the American Humanist Association.

== L ==
- Corliss Lamont: Named a Humanist Fellow by the American Humanist Association in 1970.
- Stieg Larsson: Swedish leftist journalist, feminist, novelist and atheist, author of Millenium series of novels.
- Norman Lear: Presented the Humanist Arts Award 1977 by the American Humanist Association.
- Simon Le Bon (born 1958): English rock singer/songwriter and lead singer of Duran Duran. Patron of Humanists UK.
- Dave Leduc (born 1991): Canadian professional fighter and philanthropist. Calls himself an atheist and skeptic, also doesn't believe in an afterlife.
- Geddy Lee (born 1953): Canadian progressive rock musician and lead singer/bassist of Rush.
- Stewart Lee (born 1968): British stand-up comedian, writer and director. Supporter of Humanists UK.
- Yuan T. Lee: American chemist and Nobel laureate in Chemistry. Was one of 22 Nobel Laureates who signed Humanist Manifesto III.
- Robert Lees: Hollywood screenwriter, blacklisted in the 1950s.
- John Lennon: British singer-songwriter, producer, and peace activist
- André Michel Lwoff: French microbiologist who won the Nobel Prize in Medicine in 1965 along with François Jacob and Jacques Monod.
- Lovato Lovati: Italian scholar, poet, notary, judge. His works include: Latin verse epistles, and his short commentary of Seneca's tragedies.

== M ==
- Kirsty MacColl: English singer-songwriter.
- Paul MacCready: American aeronautical engineer. He was the founder of AeroVironment and the designer of the human-powered aircraft that won the Kremer prize.
- Seth MacFarlane: Creator of Family Guy and American Dad! and actor, comedian and singer. Harvard Humanist of the Year for 2011.
- Milan Machovec: Czech humanist philosopher, famous for Christian-Marxist dialogue in 1960s Communist Czechoslovakia.
- Bill Maher: American stand-up comedian, television host, political commentator, author, and actor.
- Eddie Marsan: English actor.
- Ewan McGregor: British actor.
- Ashley Montagu: British-American anthropologist and humanist, of Jewish ancestry, who popularized topics such as race and gender and their relation to politics and development. Named Humanist of the Year in 1995 by the American Humanist Association.
- Marvin Minsky: American cognitive scientist in the field of artificial intelligence (AI).
- Abraham Maslow: American professor of psychology at Brandeis University, Brooklyn College, New School for Social Research and Columbia University who created Maslow's hierarchy of needs. Named Humanist of the Year in 1967 by the American Humanist Association.
- Jonathan Meades: Writer, broadcaster and prominent Humanists UK member.
- Tim Minchin: Comedian, pianist, composer, actor whose work often focuses around the subjects of religion, naturalism and reason.
- Mario J. Molina: Mexican chemist and Nobel laureate in Chemistry; one of 21 Nobel Laureates who signed the Humanist Manifesto.
- R. Lester Mondale: Signer of the original Humanist Manifesto.
- Henry Morgentaler: Canadian physician and prominent pro-choice advocate who has fought numerous legal battles for that cause. Given the title, "Humanist of the Year" in 1975 by the American Humanist Association.
- Hermann Joseph Muller: American geneticist, educator, and Nobel laureate best known for his work on the physiological and genetic effects of radiation (X-ray mutagenesis) as well as his outspoken political beliefs. Named Humanist of the Year in 1963 by the American Humanist Association.
- PZ Myers: American scientist and biology professor at the University of Minnesota Morris (UMM) and the author of the Pharyngula science blog; named Humanist of the Year in 2009 by the American Humanist Association.

== N ==
- Jawaharlal Nehru: India's first Prime Minister.
- Erwin Neher: German biophysicist and Nobel Laureate in Medicine. Was one of 21 Nobel Laureates who signed the Humanist Manifesto.
- Huey P. Newton: African-American political and urban activist who, along with Bobby Seale, co-founded the Black Panther Party.
- Kathleen Nott: British poet, novelist, critic, philosopher and editor.
- Gary Numan: English singer, composer, and musician.
- Bill Nye: American science educator, comedian, television host, actor, mechanical engineer, and scientist. Named Humanist of the Year in 2010 by the American Humanist Association.
- Kazi Nazrul Islam: A Bengali poet, writer, and musician (see Nazrul Geeti) widely known as the "Bidrohī Kôbi" (Rebel Poet). Born in the British Raj period into a Bengali Muslim Kazi family, he composed over 500 Hindu devotional songs; his cross-religious works led to him being declared a Kafir (Infidel) by a section of Muslims, while also facing scrutiny from segments of the Hindu community. Nazrul was a staunch proponent of humanism. In a 1920 editorial in Joog Bani, he advocated for religious pluralism, writing: "Come brother Hindu! Come Musalman! Come Buddhist! Come Christian! Let us transcend all barriers, let us forsake forever all smallness, all lies, all selfishness and let us call brothers as brothers. We shall quarrel no more."

== O ==
- Joyce Carol Oates: American author. Named Humanist of the Year in 2007 by the American Humanist Association.
- J. Robert Oppenheimer: American theoretical physicist and professor of physics at the University of California, Berkeley. Along with Enrico Fermi: often called the "father of the atomic bomb" for his role in the Manhattan Project.

== P ==
- Elliot Page: Canadian actor.
- Linus Pauling: American chemist, biochemist, peace activist, author, and educator; named Humanist of the Year in 1961 by the American Humanist Association.
- Neil Peart: Canadian musician and author. He was the drummer and lyricist for the rock band Rush; has received numerous awards for his musical performances, and was known for his technical proficiency and stamina.
- Jean-Claude Pecker: French astronomer, astrophysicist, author, member of the French Academy of Sciences, director of the Nice Observatory, president of the Association française pour l'information scientifique (AFIS), vice-president of the French UNESCO committee in 1990 and afterwards French permanent representative to UNESCO on behalf of the International Humanist and Ethical Union (IHEU), received IHEU Award for services to Humanism in 2005.
- Steven Pinker: Humanist of the Year in 2006 by the American Humanist Association, and is a Humanist Laureate in the International Academy of Humanism.
- Charles Francis Potter: Signer of the original Humanist Manifesto.
- Karl Popper: Humanist Laureate in the International Academy of Humanism.
- Sir Terry Pratchett: British novelist and satirist.
- Ilya Prigogine: Belgian physical chemist and Nobel laureate in Chemistry; one of 21 Nobel Laureates who signed the Humanist Manifesto.
- Philip Pullman: English writer. Presented the International Humanist Award by the American Humanist Association in 2008.

== R ==
- James Randi: Canadian-American stage magician and scientific skeptic best known as a challenger of paranormal claims and pseudoscience.
- A. Philip Randolph: Leader in the civil rights movement and the American labor movement. He organized and led the Brotherhood of Sleeping Car Porters, the first predominantly Negro labor union. Named Humanist of the Year in 1970 by the American Humanist Association.
- Curtis W. Reese: Signer of the original Humanist Manifesto.
- Oscar Riddle: American biologist. Known for his research into the pituitary gland and for isolating the hormone prolactin. Named Humanist of the Year in 1958 by the American Humanist Association.
- Alice May Roberts (born 19 May 1973): English biological anthropologist, biologist, television presenter and author. Since 2012 she has been Professor of the Public Engagement in Science at the University of Birmingham. Since 2019, she has been President of the charity Humanists UK.
- Richard J. Roberts: British biochemist, molecular biologist and Nobel laureate in Physiology or Medicine. Was one of 21 Nobel Laureates who signed the Humanist Manifesto.
- Gene Roddenberry (1921–1991): American screenwriter, producer, de facto populistic philosopher, and satirist; creator of Star Trek. Roddenberry was a member of the American Humanist Association, and he has been called "one of the most influential yet unheralded humanists of the twentieth century." Presented the Humanist Arts Award in 1991 by the American Humanist Association.
- Carl Rogers: American psychologist and among the founders of the humanistic approach to psychology. Towards the end of his life, he was nominated for the Nobel Peace Prize for his work with national intergroup conflict in South Africa and Northern Ireland. Named Humanist of the Year in 1964 by the American Humanist Association.
- Richard Rorty: Humanist Laureate in the International Academy of Humanism.
- Joseph Rotblat: Polish-born, British-naturalized physicist. A signatory of the Russell–Einstein Manifesto, he was secretary general of the Pugwash Conferences on Science and World Affairs from its founding until 1973. In conjunction with the Pugwash Conferences, he received the Nobel Peace Prize in 1995 for their efforts towards nuclear disarmament.
- M. N. Roy: Indian political philosopher and activist, author of Reason, Romanticism and Revolution (1952, 1955) and other works, espoused a "New Humanism" as an alternative to individualism and Marxism.
- Arnold Ruge
- Salman Rushdie: Humanist Laureate in the International Academy of Humanism, and he received the Outstanding Lifetime Achievement Award in Cultural Humanism from the American Humanist Association in 2007.
- Bertrand Russell: British philosopher, mathematician and academic. While refusing to label himself as a humanist (preferring to be called a rationalist or skeptic), he was a member and director of the British Humanist Association.

== S ==
- Carl Sagan: Humanist of the Year by the American Humanist Association in 1981, Humanist Laureate in the International Academy of Humanism.
- Edward Said: Palestinian-American literary theorist and advocate for Palestinian rights. He was an influential cultural critic and author, known best for his book, Orientalism. One of his last books was called, Humanism and Democratic Criticism.
- Jonas Salk: American medical researcher and virologist, best known for his discovery and development of the first safe and effective polio vaccine. Named Humanist of the Year in 1976 by the American Humanist Association.
- Andrei Sakharov: Soviet nuclear physicist, dissident and human rights activist; named Humanist of the Year in 1980 by the American Humanist Association.
- Margaret Sanger: American sex educator, nurse, and birth control activist. Sanger coined the term birth control, opened the first birth control clinic in the United States, and established Planned Parenthood. Named Humanist of the Year in 1957 by the American Humanist Association.
- Jean-Paul Sartre: French existentialist and Marxist philosopher, playwright, novelist, screenwriter, biographer, activist, and critic; author of Existentialism is a Humanism.
- John Ralston Saul: Canadian essayist and novelist who supported humanism over corporatism in Voltaire's Bastards – The Dictatorship of Reason in the West and The Unconscious Civilization.
- F. C. S. Schiller (1864–1937): German-British philosopher, early coiner of the term "humanism."
- Michael Schmidt-Salomon: German philosopher, author of Manifesto of Evolutionary Humanism and chairman of the Giordano Bruno Foundation.
- Erwin Schrödinger: Austrian physicist who developed a number of fundamental results in the field of quantum theory, which formed the basis of wave mechanics: he formulated the non-relativistic quantum wave equation (stationary and time-dependent Schrödinger equation) and proved its equivalence to Heisenberg et al.'s matrix mechanics.
- William F. Schulz: Executive Director of Amnesty International USA, the U.S. division of Amnesty International, from March 1994 to 2006. He is an ordained Unitarian Universalist minister, and served as president of the Unitarian Universalist Association from 1985 to 1993. Named Humanist of the Year in 2000 by the American Humanist Association.
- Charles M. Schulz: American cartoonist who created the comic strip, Peanuts. From the late 1980s, he described himself in interviews as a "Secular Humanist".
- Rod Serling: Creator and narrator of The Twilight Zone.
- Michael Shermer: American science writer, historian of science, founder of The Skeptics Society, and Editor in Chief of its magazine Skeptic.
- Marc Sinden: English theatre producer and actor. Supporter of Humanists UK and the National Secular Society.
- Peter Singer: Humanist Laureate in the International Academy of Humanism.
- Paul Sinha: Professional quizzer and stand-up comedian, Patron of Humanists UK.
- Stellan Skarsgård: Swedish actor.
- B.F. Skinner: American behaviorist, author, inventor, social philosopher and poet; named Humanist of the Year in 1972 by the American Humanist Association.
- Linda Smith: British comedian; former president of British Humanist Association
- Kate Smurthwaite: British comedian
- Wole Soyinka: Nigerian author and winner of the Nobel Prize in Literature
- Benjamin Spock: American pediatrician, writer of the 1946 book Baby and Child Care. In addition to his pediatric work, Spock was an activist in the New Left and anti Vietnam War movements during the 1960s and early 1970s; named Humanist of the Year in 1968 by the American Humanist Association.
- Pete Stark: former U.S. Representative from California's 13th congressional district. He is a member of the Democratic Party; named Humanist of the Year in 2008 by the American Humanist Association.
- Gloria Steinem: American feminist and political activist; named a Humanist Pioneer in 1978 and Humanist of the Year in 2012, both by the American Humanist Association.
- Patrick Stewart: British actor. Patron of Humanists UK.
- John Sulston: British biologist. He is a joint winner of the 2002 Nobel Prize in Physiology or Medicine along with Sydney Brenner and H. Robert Horvitz; one of 21 Nobel Laureates who signed the Humanist Manifesto.
- Christer Sturmark: Chairman of the Swedish Humanist Organisation.
- Thomas Szasz: Hungarian-American psychiatrist and academic. Since 1990, he has been Professor Emeritus of Psychiatry at the State University of New York Health Science Center in Syracuse, New York. He is a well-known social critic of the moral and scientific foundations of psychiatry, and of the social control aims of medicine in modern society, as well as of scientism. Named Humanist of the Year in 1973 by the American Humanist Association.
- Leó Szilárd: Austro-Hungarian physicist and inventor; named Humanist of the Year in 1960 by the American Humanist Association.

== T ==
- George Takei: American actor and activist; presented with the LGBT Humanist Pride Award by the American Humanist Association in 2012.
- Henry Taube: Canadian-born American chemist and Nobel laureate in Chemistry; one of 21 Nobel Laureates who signed the Humanist Manifesto.
- E. Donnall Thomas: American physician and Nobel laureate in Physiology or Medicine; one of 21 Nobel Laureates who signed the Humanist Manifesto.
- Sandi Toksvig: British-Danish writer, broadcaster, actor and producer on British radio, stage, and television. She is also a political activist, having co-founded the Women's Equality Party in 2015.
- Carolyn Tomei: State representative from Oregon, formerly the Mayor of Milwaukie, Oregon.
- Valentin Turchin: Soviet and American cybernetician and computer scientist. He developed the Refal programming language, the theory of metasystem transitions and the notion of supercompilation. As such he can be seen as a pioneer in Artificial Intelligence and one of the visionaries at the basis of the Global brain idea. One of the signers of "A Secular Humanist Declaration".
- Ted Turner: American entrepreneur. Named Humanist of the Year in 1990 by the American Humanist Association.
- Mark Twain: American author and humorist. He is most noted for his novels, The Adventures of Tom Sawyer, and its sequel, Adventures of Huckleberry Finn.
- Neil DeGrasse Tyson: American astrophysicist and science communicator. Presented with the Isaac Asimov Science Award in 2009 by the American Humanist Association.
- Nikola Tesla: Serbian-American electrical and mechanical engineer / inventor best known for his contributions to the design of the modern alternating current (AC) electrical supply system.

== U ==
- Björn Ulvaeus: Member of the band ABBA
- Peter Ustinov: Humanist Laureate in the International Academy of Humanism.
- Cenk Uygur: Host of the popular YouTube and radio show The Young Turks. Presented with the Humanist Media Award in 2012 by the American Humanist Association.

== V ==
- Gore Vidal: American author, playwright, essayist, screenwriter, and political activist. Vidal was Honorary President of the American Humanist Association from April 2009 until his death in 2012, and was presented with the organization's Humanist Arts Award in 1984.
- Kurt Vonnegut: American author and satirist. Vonnegut was Honorary President of the American Humanist Association from 1992 until his death in 2007, and was named Humanist of the Year in 1992. He was a Humanist Laureate in the International Academy of Humanism.
- Ramswaroop Verma (1923–1998): Founded the humanist organisation Arjak Sangh.

== W ==
- Alice Walker: American author, poet, and activist. She is best known for the critically acclaimed novel The Color Purple. Named Humanist of the Year in 1997 by the American Humanist Association.
- James Peter Warbasse: American surgeon and advocate for cooperatives. He founded the Cooperative League of the United States of America (which later became the National Cooperative Business Association) and was its president from 1916 to 1941. Named Humanist of the Year in 1955 by the American Humanist Association.
- Ibn Warraq: Author of Why I am Not a Muslim, and chair of the Council for Secular Humanism's Committee for the Study of Koranic Literature.
- James D. Watson: Co-discoverer of the structure of DNA, is a Humanist Laureate in the International Academy of Humanism.
- Faye Wattleton: First African-American and youngest President ever elected to Planned Parenthood (1978–1992). Named Humanist of the Year in 1986 by the American Humanist Association.
- Steven Weinberg: American theoretical physicist and Nobel laureate in Physics for his contributions with Abdus Salam and Sheldon Glashow to the unification of the weak force and electromagnetic interaction between elementary particles. Named Humanist of the Year in 2002 by the American Humanist Association.
- Joss Whedon: Television writer and director.
- Walt Whitman: American poet, essayist and journalist. A humanist, he was a part of the transition between transcendentalism and realism, incorporating both views in his works. Whitman is among the most influential poets in the American canon, often called the father of free verse.
- E. O. Wilson: Humanist Laureate in the International Academy of Humanism.
- Edwin H. Wilson: Signer of the original Humanist Manifesto. He also co-authored Humanist Manifesto II. The American Humanist Association presented Wilson with the Humanist Merit in 1955, named him and Humanist Fellow in 1969 and a Humanist Pioneer in 1973, and Humanist of the Year in 1979.
- Sherwin T. Wine: Rabbi and founder of Society for Humanistic Judaism. Named Humanist of the Year in 2003 by the American Humanist Association.
- Steve Wozniak: American inventor. Received the Isaac Asimov Science Award in 2011 from the American Humanist Association.

== Y ==
- Thom Yorke: English musician and singer-songwriter who is the lead vocalist and principal songwriter of the rock band Radiohead.

== Z ==
- Frank Zappa: American composer, singer-songwriter, electric guitarist, record producer and film director. In a career spanning more than 30 years, Zappa wrote rock, jazz, orchestral and musique concrète works.
- Howard Zinn: American historian, academic, author, playwright, and social activist.

== See also ==
- American Humanist Association
- Humanists UK
- Lists of secularists: Agnostics, Atheists, Nontheists
- List of secularist organizations
