= Coleman–Weinberg potential =

Potential arising from loop effects

The Coleman–Weinberg model represents quantum electrodynamics of a scalar field in four-dimensions. The Lagrangian for the model is

$$L = -\frac{1}{4} (F_{\mu \nu})^2 + |D_{\mu} \phi|^2 - m^2 |\phi|^2 - \frac{\lambda}{6} |\phi|^4$$

where the scalar field is complex, $F_{\mu \nu}=\partial_\mu A_\nu-\partial_\nu A_\mu$ is the electromagnetic field tensor, and $D_{\mu}=\partial_\mu-\mathrm i (e/\hbar c)A_\mu$ the covariant derivative containing the electric charge $e$ of the electromagnetic field.

Assume that $\lambda$ is nonnegative. Then if the mass term is tachyonic, $m^2<0$ there is a spontaneous breaking of the gauge symmetry at low energies, a variant of the Higgs mechanism. On the other hand, if the squared mass is positive, $m^2>0$ the vacuum expectation of the field $\phi$ is zero. At the classical level the latter is true also if $m^2=0$. However, as was shown by Sidney Coleman and Erick Weinberg, even if the renormalized mass is zero, spontaneous symmetry breaking still happens due to the radiative corrections (this introduces a mass scale into a classically conformal theory - the model has a conformal anomaly).

The same can happen in other gauge theories. In the broken phase the fluctuations of the scalar field $\phi$ will manifest themselves as a naturally light Higgs boson, as a matter of fact even too light to explain the electroweak symmetry breaking in the minimal model - much lighter than vector bosons. There are non-minimal models that give a more realistic scenarios. Also the variations of this mechanism were proposed for the hypothetical spontaneously broken symmetries including supersymmetry.

Equivalently one may say that the model possesses a first-order phase transition as a function of $m^2$. The model is the four-dimensional analog of the three-dimensional Ginzburg–Landau theory used to explain the properties of superconductors near the phase transition.

The three-dimensional version of the Coleman–Weinberg model governs the superconducting phase transition which can be both first- and second-order, depending on the ratio of the Ginzburg–Landau parameter $\kappa\equiv\lambda/e^2$, with a tricritical point near $\kappa=1/\sqrt 2$ which separates type I from type II superconductivity. Historically, the order of the superconducting phase transition was debated for a long time since the temperature interval where fluctuations are large (Ginzburg interval) is extremely small. The question was finally settled in 1982. If the Ginzburg–Landau parameter $\kappa$ that distinguishes type-I and type-II superconductors (see also here) is large enough, vortex fluctuations becomes important which drive the transition to second order. The tricritical point lies at roughly $\kappa=0.76/\sqrt{2}$, i.e., slightly below the value $\kappa=1/\sqrt{2}$ where type-I goes over into type-II superconductor. The prediction was confirmed in 2002 by Monte Carlo computer simulations.

== Literature ==
- S. Coleman and E. Weinberg (1973). "Radiative Corrections as the Origin of Spontaneous Symmetry Breaking". Physical Review D. 7 (6): 1888–1910. arXiv:hep-th/0507214. Bibcode:1973PhRvD...7.1888C. doi:10.1103/PhysRevD.7.1888. S2CID 6898114.
- L.D. Landau (1937). "On the theory of phase transitions. II". Zhurnal Eksperimental'noi i Teoreticheskoi Fiziki. 7: 627.
- V.L. Ginzburg and L.D. Landau (2009). "On the Theory of Superconductivity". On Superconductivity and Superfluidity. pp. 113–137. doi:10.1007/978-3-540-68008-6_4. ISBN 978-3-540-68004-8.
- M.Tinkham (2004). Introduction to Superconductivity. Dover Books on Physics (2nd ed.). Dover. ISBN 0-486-43503-2.

== See also ==
- Quartic interaction
