= Sidney Coleman =

American physicist (1937–2007)

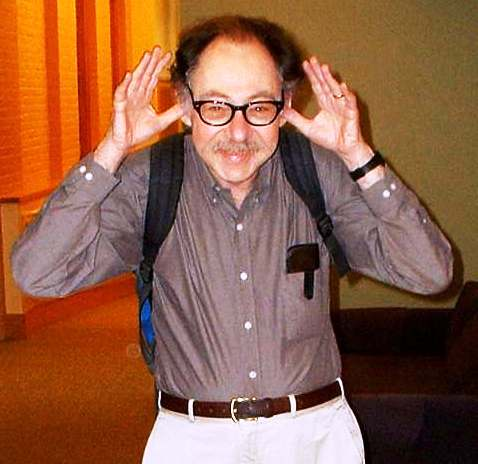
- Born: March 7, 1937; Chicago, Illinois, US
- Died: November 18, 2007 (aged 70); Cambridge, Massachusetts, US
- Education: IIT (B.Sc. 1957); Caltech (Ph.D. 1962)
- Known for: Coleman theorem; Coleman–Mandula theorem; Coleman–Weinberg potential; Q-ball; Bosonization; Tadpole (physics)
- Awards: Fellow, National Academy of Sciences; Fellow, American Academy of Arts and Sciences; NAS Award for Scientific Reviewing (1989); Dirac Medal (1990); Dannie Heineman Prize for Mathematical Physics (2000)
- Scientific career
- Fields: High-energy physics; Quantum field theory
- Workplaces: Harvard University
- Doctoral advisor: Murray Gell-Mann
- Doctoral students: Ian Affleck; Mark Alford; Carl M. Bender; Jacques Distler; David Griffiths; Jeffrey Mandula; Stephen Parke; Leonard Parker; David Politzer; Lee Smolin; Paul Steinhardt; Erick Weinberg; Anthony Zee; Full list
- Other notable students: Edward Witten

Sidney Richard Coleman (7 March 1937 – 18 November 2007) was an American theoretical physicist noted for his research in high-energy physics.

== Life and work ==
Sidney Coleman grew up on the Far North Side of Chicago. In 1957, he received his bachelor's degree in physics from the Illinois Institute of Technology (IIT).

Coleman received his Ph.D. from the California Institute of Technology (Caltech) in 1962, where he was advised by Murray Gell-Mann. He moved to Harvard University that year, where he spent his entire career, meeting his future wife Diana there in the late 1970s. They married in 1982.

"He was a giant in a peculiar sense, because he's not known to the general populace," Nobel laureate Sheldon Glashow told The Boston Globe. "He's not a Stephen Hawking; he has virtually no visibility outside. But within the community of theoretical physicists, he's kind of a major god. He is the physicist's physicist." For his part, Coleman saw Hawking's celebrity status as a positive; it brought Hawking to the United States, including to New England, more often.

In 1966, Antonino Zichichi recruited Coleman as a lecturer at the then-new summer school at International School for Subnuclear Physics in Erice, Sicily. A legendary figure at the school throughout the 1970s and early 1980s, Coleman was awarded the title "Best Lecturer" on the occasion of the school's fifteenth anniversary (1979). His explanation of spontaneous symmetry breaking in terms of a little man living inside a ferromagnet has often been cited by later popularizers. The classic particle physics text Aspects of Symmetry (1985) is a collection of Coleman's lectures at Erice. A quote from his introduction to the book is worth sharing here:

I first came to Erice in 1966, to lecture at the fourth of the annual schools on subnuclear physics organized by Nino Zichichi. I was charmed by the beauty of Erice, fascinated by the thick layers of Sicilian culture and history, and terrified by the iron rule with which Nino kept the students and faculty in line. In a word, I was won over, and I returned to Erice every year or two thereafter, to talk of what was past, or passing, or to come, at least insofar as it touched on subnuclear theory…These lectures span fourteen years, from 1966 to 1979. This was a great time to be a high-energy theorist, the period of the famous triumph of quantum field theory. And what a triumph it was, in the old sense of the word: a glorious victory parade, full of wonderful things brought back from far places to make the spectator gasp with awe and laugh with joy. I hope some of that awe and joy has been captured here.

Coleman's lectures at Harvard University were legendary. Students in one quantum field theory course created T-shirts bearing his image and a collection of his more noted quotations, among them: "Not only God knows, I know, and by the end of the semester, you will know." Despite this acclaim, in 1977 he is quoted as not generally enjoy teaching or mentoring graduate students:

I hate [teaching]. You do it as part of the job. Well, that's of course false ... or maybe more true than false when I say I hate it. ... But I certainly would be just as happy if I had no graduate students. ... Occasionally there is a graduate student who is a joy to collaborate with. Both David Politzer and Erick Weinberg were of this kind, but they were essentially almost mature physicists. They were very bright by the time they came to me. In general, working with a graduate student is like teaching a course. It's tedious, unpleasant work. A pain in the neck. You do it because you're paid to do it. If I weren't paid to do it I certainly would never do it.

In 1989, Coleman was awarded the NAS Award for Scientific Reviewing from the National Academy of Sciences. That award praised his "lucid, insightful, and influential reviews on partially conserved currents, gauge theories, instantons, and magnetic monopoles—subjects fundamental to theoretical physics." In 2005, Harvard University's physics department held the "SidneyFest", a conference on quantum field theory and quantum chromodynamics, organized in his honor.

Aside from his academic work, Coleman was a prominent science fiction enthusiast. He was one of the founders of Advent:Publishers and occasionally reviewed genre books for The Magazine of Fantasy and Science Fiction.

He died after a long struggle with Lewy body disease.

== Contributions to physics ==
Some of his best known works are

- Bosonization
- Coleman–Mandula theorem
- Tadpoles
- Coleman theorem
- Equivalence of the Thirring model and the quantum sine-Gordon equation
- Semiclassical analysis of the fate of a false vacuum
- Coleman–Weinberg potential
- Q-balls in the thin-wall limit
- Lectures at Erice, some of which are preserved in his book Aspects of Symmetry (review and teaching)

== Famous quotes ==
- "In order to know the truth, it is necessary to imagine a thousand falsehoods."
- "Quantum gravity is notoriously a subject where problems vastly outnumber results."
