= Mark Alford (physicist) =

American physicist (born 1962)

Mark G. Alford
- Education: University of Oxford (BS); Harvard University (PhD)
- Scientific career
- Fields: Astrophysics; Neutron stars High-energy physics Quantum chromodynamics Theoretical physics
- Institutions: Washington University in St. Louis
- Doctoral advisor: Sidney Coleman; Frank Wilczek

Mark G. Alford (born 3 July 1962) is a theoretical physicist and former chair (2012-2022) of the Department of Physics at Washington University in St. Louis. He researches dense matter inside neutron stars.

Alford received his bachelor's degree with first-class honors from Exeter College, Oxford in 1984 and his master's and doctoral degrees from Harvard University in 1988 and 1990, respectively, under the supervision of Sidney Coleman. Afterwards he held postdoctoral positions at the Kavli Institute for Theoretical Physics, Cornell University's Laboratory of Nuclear Studies, the Institute for Advanced Study, and the MIT Center for Theoretical Physics. He became a lecturer at the University of Glasgow in 2000, before becoming a professor in the Arts and Sciences at Washington University in St. Louis in 2003. He is a fellow of the American Physical Society.
