= Hugh David Politzer =

American theoretical physicist

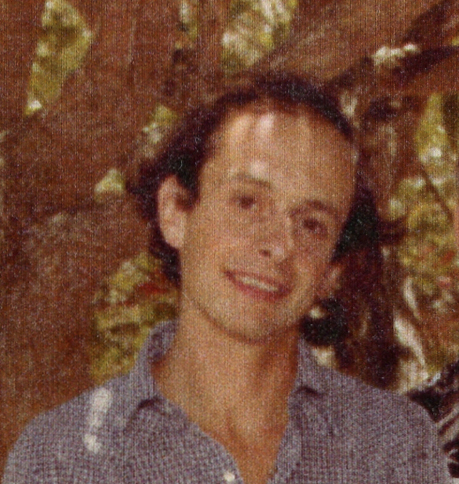
- Politzer in 1979
- Born: August 31, 1949 (age 76); New York City, U.S.
- Education: University of Michigan; Harvard University
- Known for: Asymptotic freedom Prediction of charmonium Quantum chromodynamics
- Awards: Nobel Prize in Physics (2004); Sakurai Prize (1986)
- Scientific career
- Fields: Physics
- Workplaces: California Institute of Technology
- Thesis: Asymptotic freedom: an approach to strong interactions (1974)
- Doctoral advisor: Sidney Coleman
- Doctoral students: Stephen Wolfram

Hugh David Politzer (/ˈpɑːlɪtsər/; born August 31, 1949) is an American theoretical physicist. He shared the 2004 Nobel Prize in Physics with David Gross and Frank Wilczek "for the discovery of asymptotic freedom in the theory of the strong interaction".

He is the Richard Chace Tolman Professor of Theoretical Physics at the California Institute of Technology.

== Life and career ==
Politzer was born in New York City. His parents escaped to England from Czechoslovakia in 1939 and immigrated to the U.S. after World War II. He graduated from the Bronx High School of Science in 1966, received his bachelor's degree in physics from the University of Michigan in 1969, and his PhD in 1974 from Harvard University, where his graduate advisor was Sidney Coleman.

In his first published article, which appeared in 1973, Politzer described the phenomenon of asymptotic freedom: the closer quarks are to each other, the weaker the strong interaction will be between them. When quarks are in extreme proximity, the nuclear force between them is so weak that they behave almost like free particles. This result—independently discovered at around the same time by Gross and Wilczek at Princeton University—was extremely important in the development of quantum chromodynamics. With Thomas Appelquist, Politzer also played a central role in predicting the existence of "charmonium", a subatomic particle formed of a charm quark and a charm antiquark.

Politzer was a junior fellow at the Harvard Society of Fellows from 1974 to 1977 before moving to the California Institute of Technology (Caltech), where he is currently professor of theoretical physics. In 1986, he was awarded the J. J. Sakurai Prize for Theoretical Particle Physics by the American Physical Society. In 1989, he appeared in a minor role in the movie Fat Man and Little Boy, as Manhattan Project physicist Robert Serber. In 2003 he was awarded the High Energy Particle Physics Prize of the European Physical Society, jointly with David J. Gross and Frank Wilczek. The Nobel Prize in Physics 2004 was awarded jointly to David J. Gross, H. David Politzer and Frank Wilczek "for the discovery of asymptotic freedom in the theory of the strong interaction."

Politzer is one of the 20 American recipients of the Nobel Prize in Physics to sign a letter addressed to President George W. Bush in May 2008, urging him to "reverse the damage done to basic science research in the Fiscal Year 2008 Omnibus Appropriations Bill" by requesting additional emergency funding for the Department of Energy’s Office of Science, the National Science Foundation, and the National Institute of Standards and Technology.

Politzer was elected as a member of the American Academy of Arts and Sciences in 2011.

Politzer plays the banjo and has done research on the physics of the instrument.

== Trivia ==
Politzer was the lead vocalist in the 1980s for Professor Politzer and the Rho Mesons, which put out their single, "The Simple Harmonic Oscillator".

Politzer's Erdős-Bacon number is 5 – via appearing in Fat Man and Little Boy with Laura Dern (in Novocaine with Kevin Bacon) and publishing once with Sidney Coleman (Erdős number 2).

== See also ==
- List of Jewish Nobel laureates
