= John Ankwyll =

English humanist schoolmaster

John Ankwyll is normally considered to be the first English humanist schoolmaster.
