= Humanism =

Philosophical school of thought

Humanism is a philosophical stance that emphasizes the agency, and the individual and social potential, of human beings, whom it considers the starting point for serious moral and philosophical inquiry.

The meaning of the term "humanism" has changed according to successive intellectual movements that have identified with it. During the Italian Renaissance, Italian scholars inspired by Greek classical scholarship gave rise to the Renaissance humanism movement. During the Age of Enlightenment, humanistic values were reinforced by advances in science and technology, giving confidence to humans in their exploration of the world. By the early 20th century, organizations dedicated to humanism flourished in Europe and the United States, and have since expanded worldwide. In the early 21st century, the term generally denotes a focus on human well-being and advocates for human freedom, happiness, autonomy, and progress. It views humanity as responsible for the promotion and development of individuals, espouses the equal and inherent dignity of all human beings, and emphasizes a concern for humans in relation to the world. Humanists tend to advocate for human rights, free speech, progressive policies, and democracy.

Starting in the 20th century, organized humanist movements are mostly non-religious aligned with secularism, with some exceptions such as the Humanist Society which endorses Humanist chaplains. In contemporary usage, humanism as a philosophy refers to a non-theistic view centered on human agency, and a reliance only on science and reason rather than revelation from a divine source to understand the world. Many Humanists do not see religion as a precondition of morality, and as such humanists object to excessive religious entanglement with education and the state.

Many contemporary secular humanist organizations work under the umbrella of Humanists International. Well-known humanist associations include Humanists UK and the American Humanist Association.

== Etymology ==
The word "humanism" derives from the Latin word humanitas, which was first used in ancient Rome by Cicero and other thinkers to describe values related to liberal education. This etymology survives in the modern university concept of the humanities—the arts, philosophy, history, literature, and related disciplines. The word reappeared during the Italian Renaissance as umanista and entered the English language in the 16th century specifically in 1589. The word "humanist" was used to describe a group of students of classical literature and those advocating for a classical education. Humanists in the end of the 14th century, started using the phrase studia humanitatis referring to a set of disciplines in which they themselves specialized: rhetoric, grammar, poetry, history, and moral philosophy.

In 1755, in Samuel Johnson's influential A Dictionary of the English Language, the word humanist is defined as a philologer or grammarian, derived from the French word humaniste. (Note: The word Humanism is not included in the dictionary.) In a later edition of the dictionary, the meaning "a term used in the schools of Scotland" was added. In the 1780s, Thomas Howes was one of Joseph Priestley's many opponents during the celebrated Unitarian disputes. Because of the different doctrinal meanings of Unitarian and Unitarianism, Howes used "the more precise appellations of humanists and humanism" when referring to those like Priestley "who maintain the mere humanity of Christ". This theological origin of humanism is considered obsolete. (Note: The etymological link of the word humanism to the humanity or human nature of Christ has often been repeated, but typically the association is to Coleridge to whom is attributed its earliest use in 1812.)

In the early 19th century, the term humanismus was used in Germany with several meanings and from there, it re-entered the English language with two distinct denotations; an academic term linked to the study of classic literature and a more-common use that signified a non-religious approach to life contrary to theism. It is probable Bavarian theologian Friedrich Immanuel Niethammer coined the term humanismus to describe the new classical curriculum he planned to offer in German secondary schools. Soon, other scholars such as Georg Voigt and Jacob Burckhardt adopted the term. In the 20th century, the word was further refined, acquiring its contemporary meaning of a naturalistic approach to life, and a focus on the well-being and freedom of humans. In the 20th century, new terms like "Christian humanism" and "secular humanism" were popularised, fraught with "false etymological or historical assumptions (a conflation between the earlier and later usages of the word ‘humanist’)" as well as "polemical" intention; the term "secular" was first applied in the United States "as an elaborator intended to amplify disapproval, rather than as a qualifier". Secular humanism came to refer impassively to the non-religious philosophy "humanism", while the term Christian humanism has a rhetorical function, asserting by virtue of the studia humanitatis (Note: Scholars during the Italian Renaissance were by and large Roman Catholics.) being named "humanism" that Christianity begat humanist values.

== Definition ==
There is no single, widely accepted definition of humanism, and scholars have given different meanings to the term. For philosopher Sidney Hook, writing in 1974, humanists are opposed to the imposition of one culture in some civilizations, do not belong to a church or established religion, do not support dictatorships, and do not justify the use of violence for social reforms. Hook also said humanists support the elimination of hunger and improvements to health, housing, and education. In the same edited collection, Humanist philosopher H. J. Blackham argued humanism is a concept focusing on improving humanity's social conditions by increasing the autonomy and dignity of all humans. In 1999, Jeaneane D. Fowler said the definition of humanism should include a rejection of divinity, and an emphasis on human well-being and freedom. She also noted there is a lack of a shared belief system or doctrine but, in general, humanists aim for happiness and self-fulfillment.

In 2015, prominent humanist Andrew Copson defined humanism as follows:

- Humanism is naturalistic in its understanding of the universe; science and free inquiry will help us comprehend more about the universe.
- This scientific approach does not reduce humans to anything less than human beings.
- Humanists place importance on the pursuit of a self-defined, meaningful, and happy life.
- Humanism is moral; morality is a way for humans to improve their lives.
- Humanists engage in practical action to improve personal and social conditions.

According to the International Humanist and Ethical Union:

Humanism is a democratic and ethical life stance, which affirms that human beings have the right and responsibility to give meaning and shape to their own lives. It stands for the building of a more humane society through an ethic based on human and other natural values in the spirit of reason and free inquiry through human capabilities. It is not theistic, and it does not accept supernatural views of reality.

Dictionaries define humanism as a worldview or philosophical stance. According to Merriam Webster Dictionary, humanism is " ... a doctrine, attitude, or way of life centered on human interests or values; especially: a philosophy that usually rejects supernaturalism and stresses an individual's dignity and worth and capacity for self-realization through reason".

== History ==
=== Predecessors ===
Traces of humanism can be found in ancient Greek philosophy. Pre-Socratic philosophers were the first Western philosophers to attempt to explain the world in terms of human reason and natural law without relying on myth, tradition, or religion. Protagoras, who lived in Athens c. 440 BCE, put forward some fundamental humanist ideas, although only fragments of his work survive. He made one of the first agnostic statements; according to one fragment: "About the gods I am able to know neither that they exist nor that they do not exist nor of what kind they are in form: for many things prevent me for knowing this, its obscurity and the brevity of man's life". Socrates spoke of the need to "know thyself"; his thought changed the focus of then-contemporary philosophy from nature to humans and their well-being. He was a theist executed for atheism, who investigated the nature of morality by reasoning. Aristotle (384–322 BCE) taught rationalism and a system of ethics based on human nature that also parallels humanist thought. In the third century BCE, Epicurus developed an influential, human-centered philosophy that focused on achieving eudaimonia. Epicureans continued Democritus' atomist theory—a materialistic theory that suggests the fundamental unit of the universe is an indivisible atom. Human happiness, living well, friendship, and the avoidance of excesses were the key ingredients of Epicurean philosophy that flourished in and beyond the post-Hellenic world. It is a repeated view among scholars that the humanistic features of ancient Greek thought are the roots of humanism 2,000 years later.

Other predecessor movements that sometimes use the same or equivalent vocabulary to modern Western humanism can be found in Chinese philosophy and religions such as Taoism and Confucianism.

Arabic translations of Ancient Greek literature during the Abbasid Caliphate in the eighth and ninth centuries influenced Islamic philosophers. Many medieval Muslim thinkers pursued humanistic, rational, and scientific discourse in their search for knowledge, meaning, and values. A wide range of Islamic writings on love, poetry, history, and philosophical theology show medieval Islamic thought was open to humanistic ideas of individualism, occasional secularism, skepticism, liberalism, and free speech; schools were established at Baghdad, Basra and Isfahan.

=== Renaissance ===
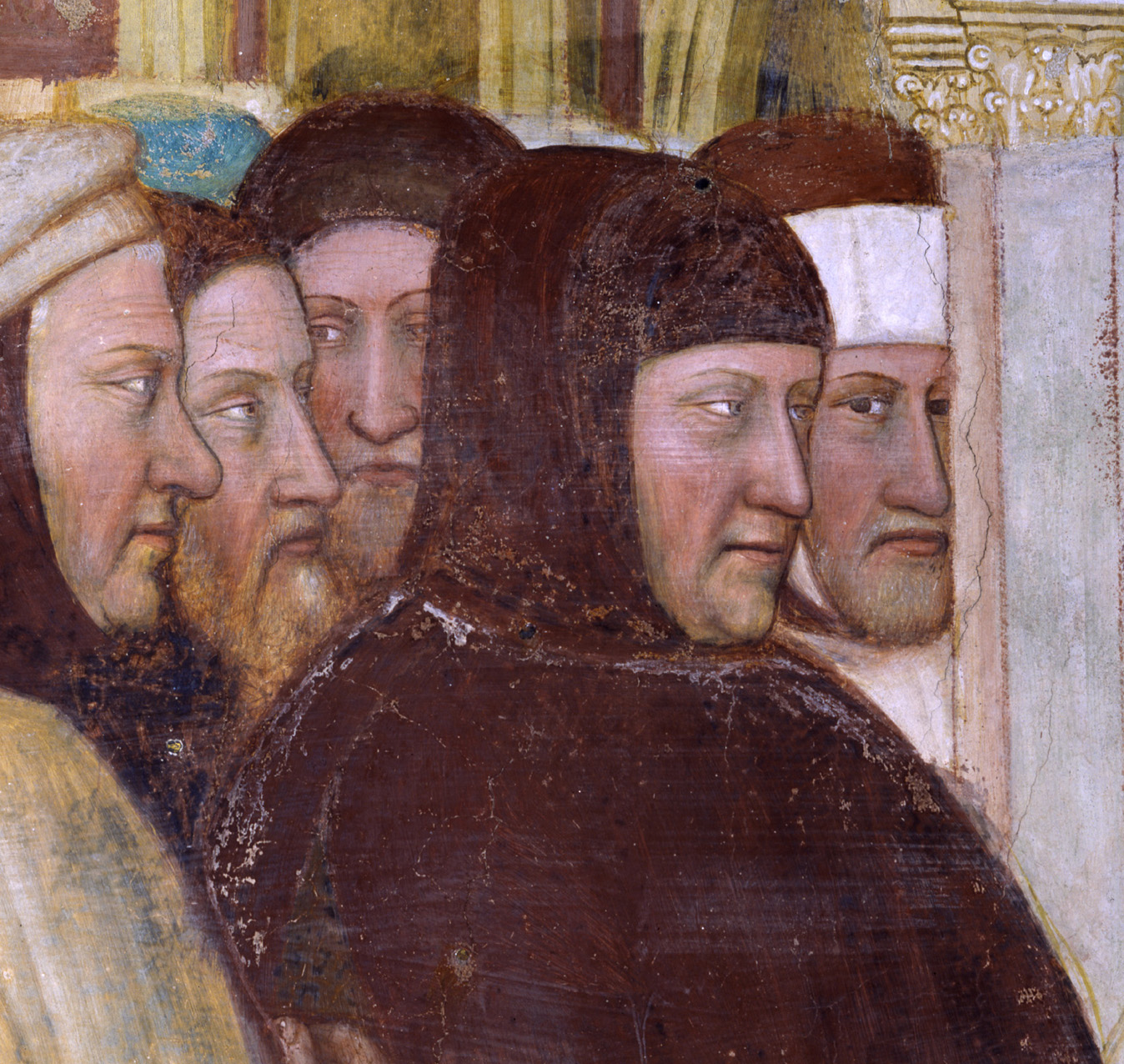
Portrait of Petrarch painted by Altichiero in 1376

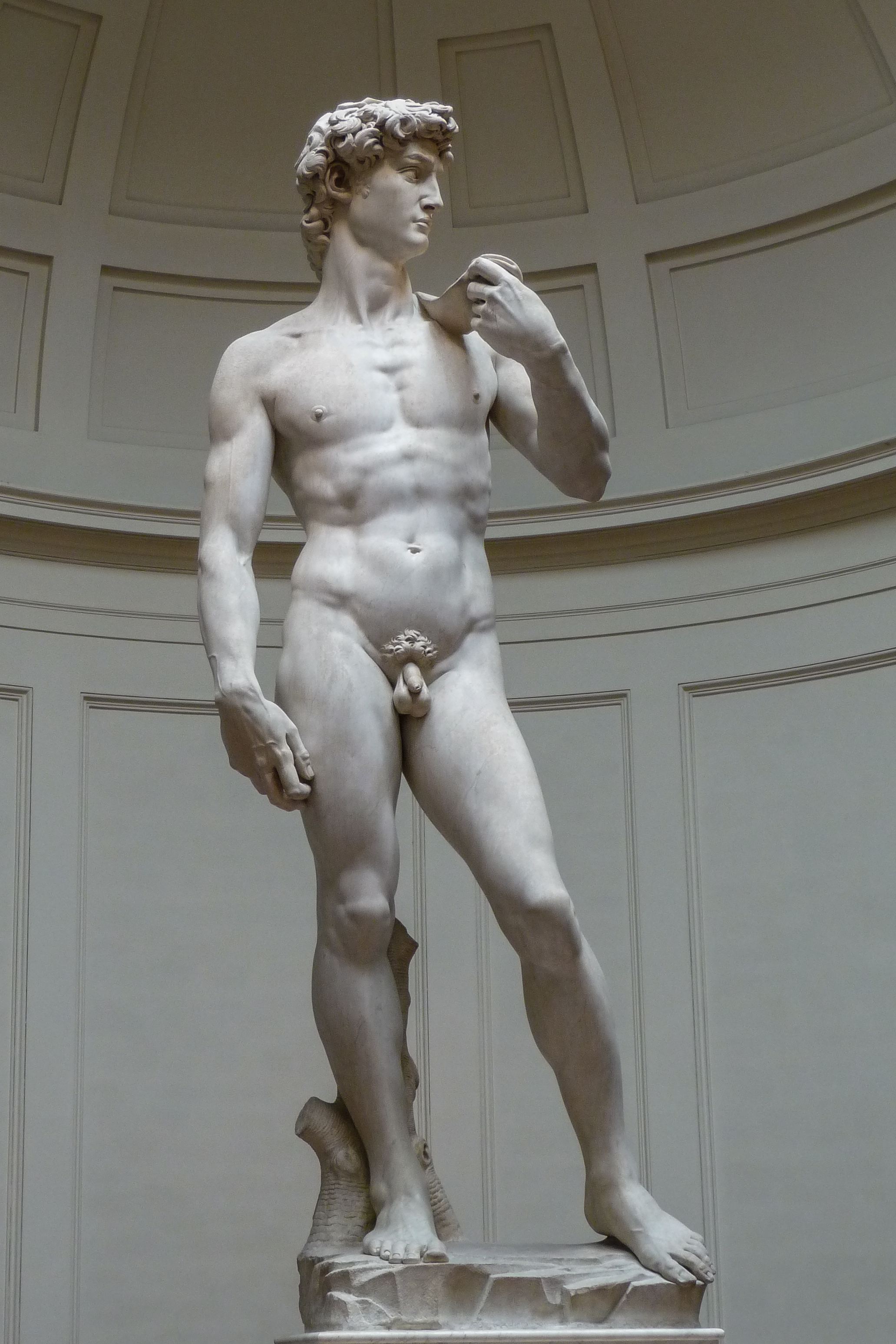
David by Michelangelo, 1501–1504. Artistic work during the Renaissance illustrates the emphasis given to anatomical details of humans.

In the Middle Ages, core humanist principles emerged and were enhanced in religious culture due to the synthesis of classical works and theological ideas. Renaissance humanism was a continuation of humanist advancements from the Middle Ages particularly from Italian and French scholasticism. The intellectual movement of Renaissance humanism first appeared in Italy and has greatly influenced both contemporaneous and modern Western culture. Renaissance humanism emerged in Italy and a renewed interest in literature and the arts occurred in 13th-century Italy, with Florence as a key center of activity. Italian scholars discovered Ancient Greek thought, particularly that of Aristotle, through Arabic translations from Africa and Spain. Other centers were Verona, Naples, and Avignon. Petrarch, who is often referred to as the father of humanism, is a significant figure. Petrarch was raised in Avignon; he was inclined toward education at a very early age and studied alongside his well-educated father. Petrarch's enthusiasm for ancient texts led him to discover manuscripts such as Cicero's Pro Archia and Pomponius Mela's De Chorographia that were influential in the development of the Renaissance. Petrarch wrote Latin poems such as Canzoniere and De viris illustribus, in which he described humanist ideas. His most-significant contribution was a list of books outlining the four major disciplines: rhetoric, moral philosophy, poetry, and grammar, that became the basis of humanistic studies (studia humanitatis). Petrarch's list relied heavily on ancient writers, especially Cicero.

The revival of classicist authors continued after Petrarch's death. Florence chancellor and humanist Coluccio Salutati made his city a prominent center of Renaissance humanism; his circle included other notable humanists—including Leonardo Bruni, who rediscovered, translated, and popularized ancient texts. Humanists heavily influenced education. Vittorino da Feltre and Guarino Veronese created schools based on humanistic principles; their curriculum was widely adopted and by the 16th century, humanistic paideia was the dominant outlook of pre-university education. Parallel with advances in education, Renaissance humanists made progress in fields such as philosophy, mathematics, and religion. In philosophy, Angelo Poliziano, Nicholas of Cusa, and Marsilio Ficino further contributed to the understanding of ancient classical philosophers and Giovanni Pico della Mirandola undermined the dominance of Aristotelian philosophy by revitalizing Sextus Empiricus' skepticism. Religious studies were affected by the growth of Renaissance humanism when Pope Nicholas V initiated the translation of Hebrew and Greek biblical texts, and other texts in those languages, to contemporaneous Latin.

Humanist values spread from Italy in the 15th century. Students and scholars went to Italy to study before returning to their homelands carrying humanistic messages. Printing houses dedicated to ancient texts were established in Venice, Basel, and Paris. By the end of the 15th century, the center of humanism had shifted from Italy to northern Europe, with Erasmus of Rotterdam being the leading humanist scholar. The longest-lasting effect of Renaissance humanism was its education curriculum and methods. Humanists insisted on the importance of classical literature in providing intellectual discipline, moral standards, and a civilized taste for the elite—an educational approach that reached the contemporary era. Politics was also heavily influenced by humanism, with King of Spain and Holy Roman Emperor Charles V being influenced by a circle of Spanish and Italian humanists, including Mercurino di Gattinara, Alfonso de Valdés, Juan Luis Vives and Antonio de Guevara. Spanish humanist Francisco de Vitoria, founder of the School of Salamanca, was heavily influential on international law and free market economics.

=== Enlightenment ===
During the Age of Enlightenment, humanistic ideas resurfaced, this time further from religion and classical literature. Science and intellectualism advanced, and humanists argued that rationality could replace deism as the means with which to understand the world. Humanistic values, such as tolerance and opposition to slavery, started to take shape. New philosophical, social, and political ideas appeared. Some thinkers rejected theism outright; and atheism, deism, and hostility to organized religion were formed. During the Enlightenment, Baruch Spinoza redefined God as signifying the totality of nature; Spinoza was accused of atheism but remained silent on the matter. Naturalism was also advanced by prominent Encyclopédistes. Baron d'Holbach wrote the polemic System of Nature, claiming that religion was built on fear and had helped tyrants throughout history. Denis Diderot and Claude Adrien Helvétius combined their materialism with sharp, political critique.

Also during the Enlightenment, the abstract conception of humanity started forming—a critical juncture for the construction of humanist philosophy. Previous appeals to "men" now shifted toward "man"; to illustrate this point, scholar Tony Davies points to political documents like The Social Contract (1762) of Rousseau, in which he says "Man is born free, but is everywhere in chains". Likewise, Thomas Paine's Rights of Man uses the singular form of the word, revealing a universal conception of "man". In parallel, Baconian empiricism—though not humanism per se—led to Thomas Hobbes's materialism.

Scholar J. Brent Crosson argues that, while there is a widely held belief that the birth of humanism was solely a European affair, intellectual thought from Africa and Asia significantly contributed as well. He also notes that during enlightenment, the universal man did not encompass all humans but was shaped by gender and race. According to Crosson, the shift from man to human started during enlightenment and is still ongoing. Crosson also argues that enlightenment, especially in Britain, produced not only a notion of universal man, but also gave birth to pseudoscientific ideas, such as those about differences between races, that shaped European history.

=== From Darwin to current era ===
French philosopher Auguste Comte (1798–1857) introduced the idea—which is sometimes attributed to Thomas Paine—of a "religion of humanity". According to scholar Tony Davies, this was intended to be an atheist cult based on some humanistic tenets, and had some prominent members but soon declined. It was nonetheless influential during the 19th century, and its humanism and rejection of supernaturalism are echoed in the works of later authors such as Oscar Wilde, George Holyoake—who coined the word secularism—George Eliot, Émile Zola, and E. S. Beesly. Paine's The Age of Reason, along with the 19th-century Biblical criticism of the German Hegelians David Strauss and Ludwig Feuerbach, also contributed to new forms of humanism.

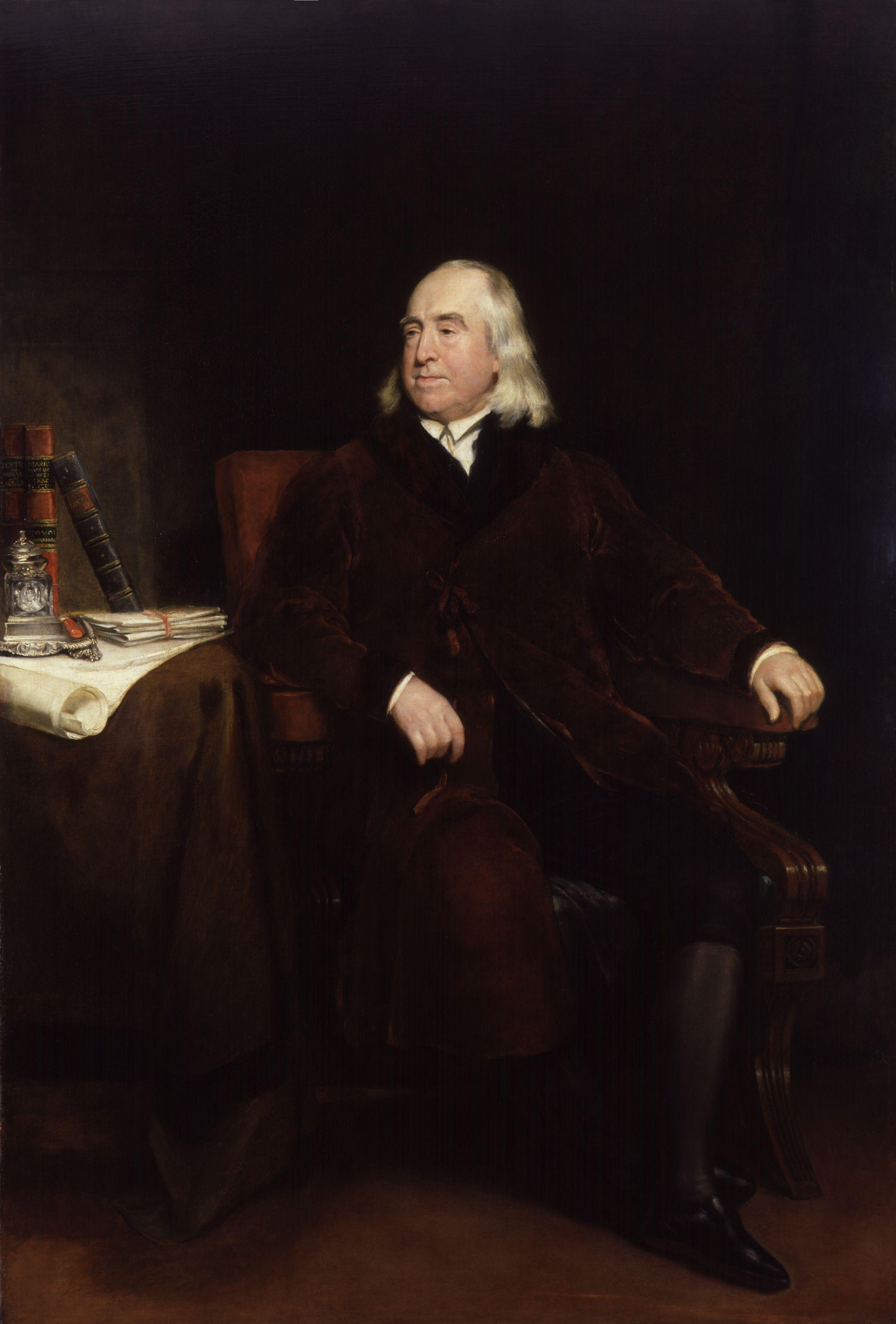
Henry William Pickersgill, Portrait of Jeremy Bentham, 1829.

Advances in science and philosophy provided scholars with further alternatives to religious belief. Charles Darwin's theory of natural selection offered naturalists an explanation for the plurality of species. Darwin's theory also suggested humans are simply a natural species, contradicting the traditional theological view of humans as more than animals. Philosophers Ludwig Feuerbach, Friedrich Nietzsche, and Karl Marx attacked religion on several grounds, and theologians David Strauss and Julius Wellhausen questioned the Bible. In parallel, utilitarianism was developed in Britain through the works of Jeremy Bentham and John Stuart Mill. Utilitarianism, a moral philosophy, centers its attention on human happiness, aiming to eliminate human and animal pain via natural means. In Europe and the US, as philosophical critiques of theistic beliefs grew, large parts of society distanced themselves from religion. Ethical societies were formed, leading to the contemporary humanist movement.

The rise of rationalism and the scientific method was followed in the late 19th century in Britain by the start of many rationalist and ethical associations, such as the National Secular Society, the Ethical Union, and the Rationalist Press Association. In the 20th century, humanism was further promoted by the work of philosophers such as A. J. Ayer, Antony Flew, and Bertrand Russell, whose advocacy of atheism in Why I Am Not a Christian further popularized humanist ideas. In 1963, the British Humanist Association evolved out of the Ethical Union, and merged with many smaller ethical and rationalist groups. Elsewhere in Europe, humanist organizations also flourished. In the Netherlands, the Dutch Humanist Alliance gained a wide base of support after World War II; in Norway, the Norwegian Humanist Association gained popular support.

In the US, humanism evolved with the aid of significant figures of the Unitarian Church. Humanist magazines began to appear, including The New Humanist, which published the Humanist Manifesto I in 1933. The American Ethical Union emerged from newly founded, small, ethicist societies. The American Humanist Association (AHA) was established in 1941 and became as popular as some of its European counterparts. The AHA spread to all states, and some prominent public figures such as Isaac Asimov, John Dewey, Erich Fromm, Paul Kurtz, Carl Sagan, and Gene Roddenberry became members. In 1952, humanist organizations from all continents formed the International Humanist and Ethical Union (IHEU), now known as Humanists International, which promotes the humanist agenda via consultative status at the United Nations organizations UNESCO and UNICEF.

== Varieties of humanism ==
The term "humanism" has been used to refer to a non-religious life stance since the 19th century, although modern humanists take the term to refer to an older phenomenon: "a non-religious approach to life [whose] associated beliefs and values have a long and rich history. We can find humanist perspectives on understanding the world, ethics, divinities, death, happiness, and organising society as far back as the first millennium BCE in ancient Greece, China, and India." Some early 20th century naturalists, who viewed their humanism as a religion and participated in church-like congregations, used the term "religious humanism". Religious humanism appeared mostly in the US and is now rarely practiced. The American Humanist Association arose from religious humanism.

The term "Renaissance humanism" was given to a tradition of cultural and educational reform engaged in by civic and ecclesiastical chancellors, book collectors, educators, and writers that developed during the 14th and early 15th centuries. By the late 15th century, these academics began to be referred to as umanisti (humanists). While modern humanism's roots can be traced in part to the Renaissance, the term "Renaissance humanism" does not meaningfully relate to humanism in the modern sense. Understanding Humanism cautions those learning about humanism from imagining there is a "linear thread" that connects the Renaissance scholarship movement to the contemporary philosophy, saying "it is important to recognise that there is no neat linear thread that connects these different uses of the word. Modern humanism is not a descendant of Renaissance humanism or ‘religious humanism’. The histories of non-religious humanism and alternative uses of the word are not one single story."

Other terms using "humanism" in their name include:

- Ethical or religious humanism: synonyms of Ethical culture. These were prominent in the US in the early 20th century and focused on relations between humans. Understanding Humanism characterizes religious humanism as "not a separate, religious form of humanism" but "just... a different way of categorising what humanism is."
- Scientific humanism: this emphasizes belief in the scientific method as a component of humanism as described in the works of John Dewey and Julian Huxley; scientific humanism is largely synonymous with secular humanism.
- Secular humanism: coined in the mid-20th century, it was initially an attempt to denigrate humanism, but some humanist associations embraced the term. Secular humanism is synonymous with the contemporary humanist movement, but may be seen as distinct from the 1980 Secular Humanist Declaration, which is highly rationalist and was framed to defend against religious fundamentalists who were calling secular humanism a dangerous, "morally corrupting" philosophy.
- Marxist humanism: one of several rival schools of Marxist thought that accepts basic humanistic tenets such as secularism and naturalism, but differs from other strands of humanism because of its vague stance on democracy and rejection of free will.
- Digital humanism: an emerging philosophical and ethical framework that seeks to preserve and promote human values, dignity, and well-being in the context of rapid technological advancements, particularly in the digital realm.

Such varieties of humanism are now largely of historical and academic interest only, and largely describe the same broader phenomenon. Some ethical movements continue but in general humanism no longer needs any qualification "because the lifestance is by definition naturalistic, scientific, and secular". In 1988, the humanist philosopher and organiser Harold Blackham wrote an influential essay which urged humanist organisations to eschew "qualifying adjectives" whose "academic sectarianism" gave the false impression of an internally divided movement, when in reality the humanist movement around the world shared the same "beliefs and values".

Not related to the other terms, but included for sake of completeness, is Christian humanism, a modern coinage linking "Renaissance humanists" to modern Christian theology. Christian humanism emphasises the humanitarian aspects of Christianity and the contributions to human well being made by Catholic scholars in the late Middle Ages who were inspired by pre-Christian sources. The term is criticised by some humanists as contradicting the human-oriented premise of humanism and rejecting humanism's focus on sticking to rational beliefs. According to Andrew Copson, deliberate attempts to put this term into currency have tried to assert that there are "two types of humanism", and thus "seriously muddy the conceptual water". Understanding Humanism says:

We need to be careful not to think of these different ‘humanisms’ as representing a neat, linear history of some single humanist worldview, one with religious and non-religious branches" and, with reference to Christian humanism, that "some argue that instead of thinking about this as an alternative branch of humanism (there being both a religious and a secular kind), it is perhaps better to avoid the label ‘Christian humanism’ for this outlook and describe it as ‘humanistic Christianity’ (as it is a form of Christianity rather than humanism)."

== Philosophy ==
Humanism is strongly linked to rationality. For humanists, humans are reasonable beings, and reasoning and the scientific method are means of finding truth. Humanists argue science and rationality have driven successful developments in various fields while the invocation of supernatural phenomena fails to coherently explain the world. One form of irrational thinking is adducing. Humanists are skeptical of explanations of natural phenomena or diseases that rely on hidden agencies.

Human autonomy is another hallmark of humanist philosophy. For people to be autonomous, their beliefs and actions must be the result of their own reasoning. For humanists, autonomy dignifies each individual; without autonomy, people's humanity is lessened. Humanists also consider human essence to be universal, irrespective of race and social status, diminishing the importance of collective identities and signifying the importance of individuals.

Immanuel Kant provided the modern philosophical basis of the humanist narrative. His theory of critical philosophy formed the basis of the world of knowledge, defending rationalism and grounding it in the empirical world. He also supported the idea of the moral autonomy of the individual, which is fundamental to his philosophy. According to Kant, morality is the product of the way humans live and not a set of fixed values. Instead of a universal ethic code, Kant suggested a universal procedure that shapes the ethics that differ among groups of people.

Philosopher and humanist advocate Corliss Lamont, in his book The Philosophy of Humanism (1997), states:

In the Humanist ethics the chief end of thought and action is to further this-earthly human interests on behalf of the greater glory of people. The watchword of Humanism is happiness for all humanity in this existence as contrasted with salvation for the individual soul in a future existence and the glorification of a supernatural Supreme Being ... It heartily welcomes all life-enhancing and healthy pleasures, from the vigorous enjoyments of youth to the contemplative delights of mellowed age, from the simple gratifications of food and drink, sunshine and sports, to the more complex appreciation of art and literature, friendship and social communion.

== Themes ==
=== Morality ===
The humanist attitude toward morality has changed since its beginning. Starting in the 18th century, humanists were oriented toward an objective and universalist stance on ethics. Both Utilitarian philosophy—which aims to increase human happiness and decrease suffering—and Kantian ethics—which states one should act in accordance with maxims one could will to become a universal law—shaped the humanist moral narrative until the early 20th century. Because the concepts of free will and reason are not based on scientific naturalism, their influence on humanists remained in the early 20th century but was reduced by social progressiveness and egalitarianism. As part of social changes in the late 20th century, humanist ethics evolved to support secularism, civil rights, personal autonomy, religious toleration, multiculturalism, and cosmopolitanism.

A naturalistic criticism of humanistic morality is the denial of the existence of morality. For naturalistic skeptics, morality was not hardwired within humans during their evolution; humans are primarily selfish and self-centered. Defending humanist morality, humanist philosopher John R. Shook makes three observations that lead him to the acceptance of morality. According to Shook, homo sapiens has a concept of morality that must have been with the species since the beginning of human history, developing by recognizing and thinking upon behaviors. He adds morality is universal among human cultures and all cultures strive to improve their moral level. Shook concludes that while morality was initially generated by our genes, culture shaped human morals and continues to do so. He calls "moral naturalism" the view that morality is a natural phenomenon, can be scientifically studied, and is a tool rather than a set of doctrines that was used to develop human culture.

Humanist philosopher Brian Ellis advocates a social humanist theory of morality called "social contractual utilitarianism", which is based on Hume's naturalism and empathy, Aristotelian virtue theory, and Kant's idealism. According to Ellis, morality should aim for eudaimonia, an Aristotelian concept that combines a satisfying life with virtue and happiness by improving societies worldwide. Humanist Andrew Copson takes a consequentialist and utilitarian approach to morality; according to Copson, all humanist ethical traits aim at human welfare. Philosopher Stephen Law emphasizes some principles of humanist ethics; respect for personal moral autonomy, rejection of god-given moral commands, an aim for human well-being, and "emphasiz[ing] the role of reason in making moral judgements".

Humanism's godless approach to morality has driven criticism from religious commentators. The necessity for a divine being delivering sets of doctrines for morals to exist is a common argument; according to Dostoevsky's character Ivan Karamázov in The Brothers Karamazov, "if God does not exist, then everything is permitted". This argument suggests chaos will ensue if religious belief disappears. For humanists, theism is an obstacle to morality rather than a prerequisite for it. According to humanists, acting only out of fear, adherence to dogma, and expectation of a reward is a selfish motivation rather than morality. Humanists point to the subjectivity of the supposedly objective divine commands by referring to the Euthyphro dilemma, originally posed by Socrates: "does God command something because it is good or is something good because God commands it?" If goodness is independent from God, humans can reach goodness without religion but relativism is elicited if God creates goodness. Another argument against this religious criticism is the human-made nature of morality, even through religious means. The interpretation of holy scriptures almost always includes human reasoning; different interpreters reach contradictory theories.

=== Religion ===
Humanism has widely been seen as antithetical to religion. Philosopher of religion David Kline, traces the roots of this animosity since the Renaissance, when humanistic views deconstructed the previous religiously defined order. Kline describes several ways this antithesis has evolved. Kline notes the emergence of a confident human-made knowledge, which was a new way of epistemology, repelled the church from its authoritative position. Kline uses the paradigm of non-humanists Copernicus, Kepler, and Galileo to illustrate how scientific discoveries added to the deconstruction of the religious narrative in favor of human-generated knowledge. This ultimately uncoupled the fate of humans from the divine will, prompting social and political shifts. The relation of state and citizens changed as civic humanistic principles emerged; people were no longer to be servile to religiously grounded monarchies but could pursue their own destinies. Kline also points at the aspects of personal belief that added to the hostility between humanism and religion. Humanism was linked with prominent thinkers who advocated against the existence of God using rationalistic arguments. Critique of theism continued through the humanistic revolutions in Europe, challenging religious worldviews, attitudes and superstitions on a rational basis—a tendency that continued to the 20th century.

According to Stephen Law, humanist adherence to secularism placed humans at odds with religion, especially nationally dominant religions striving to retain privileges gained in the last centuries. Worth notes religious persons can be secularists. Law notes secularism is criticized for suppressing freedom of expression of religious persons but firmly denies such accusation; instead, he says, secularism protects this kind of freedom but opposes the privileged status of religious views.

Some Humanists align with religion. The Humanist Society endorses Humanist chaplains and celebrants who serve as clergy. Humanist chaplains serve in various academic institutions, such as Greg Epstein, a Humanist Chaplain serving Harvard University and MIT. Humanist Chaplains also serve in militaries of various nations, to include Belgium, Denmark, Ireland, the Netherlands, Norway, and the United Kingdom.

According to Andrew Copson, humanism is not incompatible with some aspects of religion. He observes that components like belief, practice, identity, and culture can coexist, allowing an individual who subscribes to only a few religious doctrines to also identify as a humanist. Copson adds that religious critics usually frame humanism as an enemy of religion but most humanists are proponents of religious tolerance or exhibit a curiosity about religion's effects in society and politics, commenting: "Only a few are regularly outraged by other people's false beliefs per se".

=== The meaning of life ===
In the 19th century, along with the decline of religion and its accompanied teleology, the question of the meaning of life became more prominent. Unlike religions, humanism does not have a definite view on the meaning of life. Humanists commonly say people create rather than discover meaning. While philosophers such as Nietzsche and Sartre wrote on the meaning of life in a godless world, the work of Albert Camus has echoed and shaped humanism. In Camus' The Myth of Sisyphus, he quotes a Greek myth in which the absurd hero Sisyphus is destined to push a heavy rock up a hill; the rock slips back and he must repeat the task. Sisyphus is negating Gods and preset meanings of life, but argues that life has value and significance, and that each individual is able to create their meanings of life. Camus thus highlights the importance of personal agency and self-determination that lie at the centre of humanism.

Personal humanist interpretations of the meaning of life vary from the pursuit of happiness without recklessness and excesses to participation in human history, and connection with loved ones, living animals, and plants. (Note: To illustrate the importance of pursuing happiness without excesses, Andrew Copson quotes Epicurus: "When I say that pleasure is the goal of living I do not mean the pleasures of libertines ... I mean, on the contrary, the pleasure that consists of freedom from bodily pain and mental agitation. Pleasant life is not the product of one drinking party after another or sexual intercourse with women and young men or of the seafood and other delicacies afforded by the serious table. On the contrary, it is the result of sober thinking ... " Copson is citing 66 Epicurus, Letter to Menoeceus, in The Art of Happiness, trans. Strodach, p. 159.) Some answers are close to those of religious discourse if the appeal to divinity is overlooked. According to humanist professor Peter Derks, elements that contribute to the meaning of life are a morally worthy purpose in life, positive self-evaluation, an understanding of one's environment, being seen and understood by others, the ability to emotionally connect with others, and a desire to have a meaning in life. Humanist professor Anthony B. Pinn places the meaning of life in the quest of what he calls "complex subjectivity". Pinn, who is advocating for a non-theistic, humanistic religion inspired by African cultures, says seeking the never-reaching meaning of life contributes to well-being, and that rituals and ceremonies, which are occasions for reflection, provide an opportunity to assess the meaning of life, improving well-being.

Organizations like Humanists International use the "Happy Human" symbol.

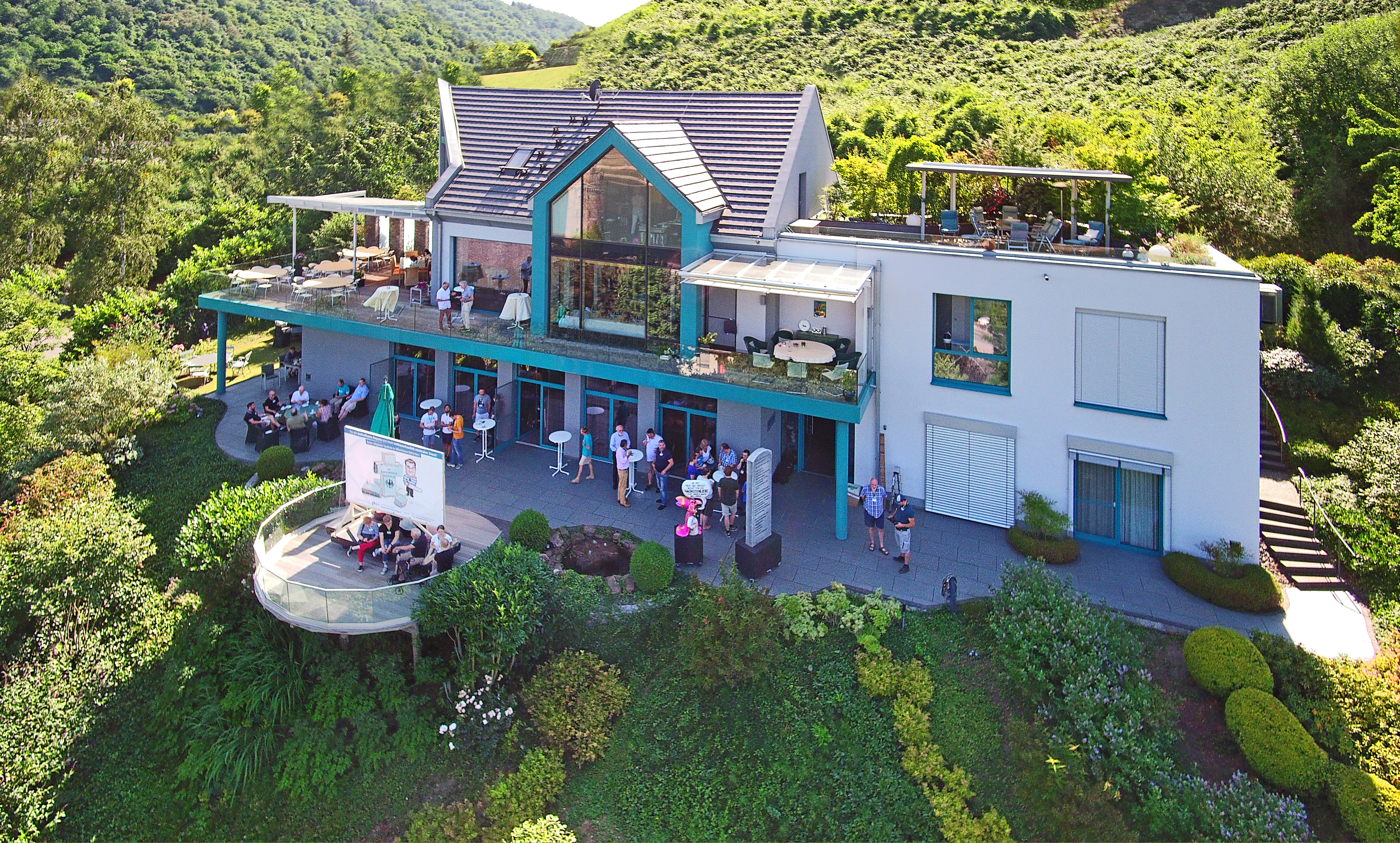
Home of Giordano Bruno Foundation in Germany.

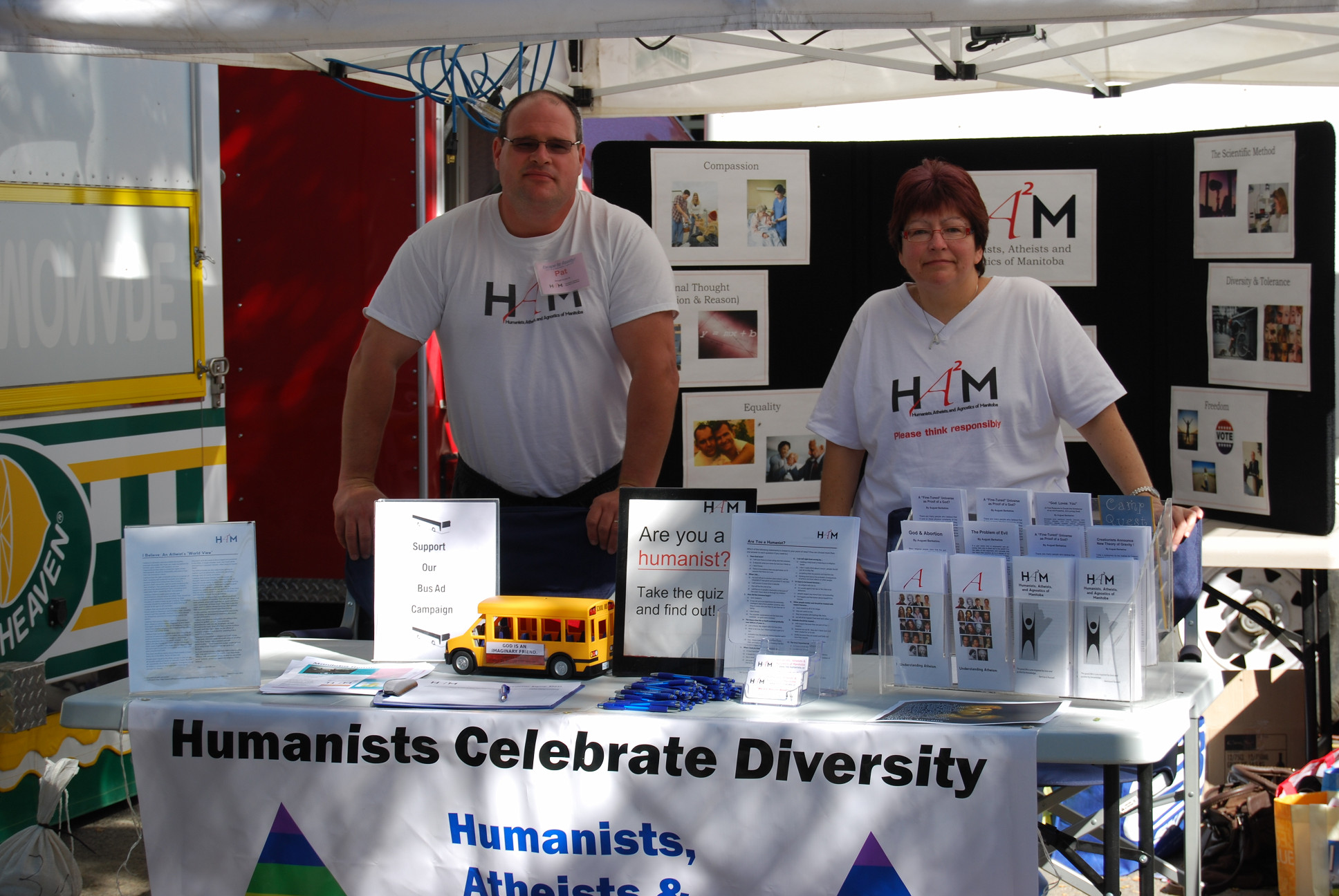
Humanists, Atheists, & Agnostics of Manitoba (HAAM) booth in 2012.

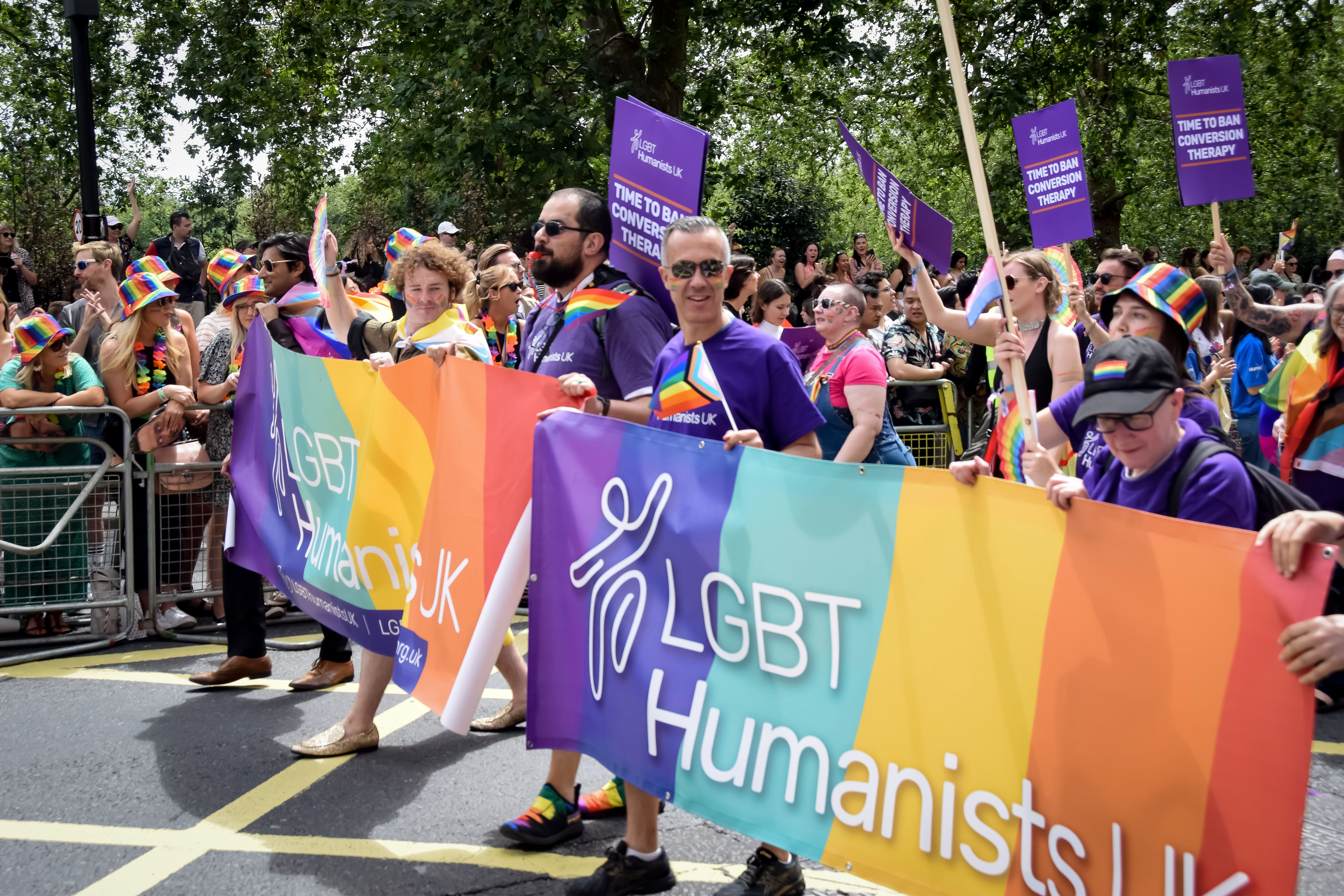
Humanists UK in London Pride 2023.

== In public life ==
=== In politics ===
The hallmark of contemporary humanism in politics is the demand for secularism. Philosopher Alan Haworth said secularism delivers fair treatment to all citizens of a nation-state since all are treated without discrimination; religion is a private issue and the state should have no power over it. He also argues that secularism helps plurality and diversity, which are fundamental aspects of our modern world. While barbarism and violence can be found in most civilizations, Haworth notes religion usually fuels rhetoric and enables these actions. He also said the values of hard work, honesty, and charity are found in other civilizations. According to Haworth, humanism opposes the irrationality of nationalism and totalitarianism, whether these are part of fascism or Marxist–Leninist communism.

According to professor Joseph O. Baker, in political theory, contemporary humanism is formed by two main tendencies; the first is individualistic and the second inclines to collectivism. The trajectory of each tendency can lead to libertarianism and socialism respectively, but a range of combinations exists. Individualistic humanists often have a philosophical perspective of humanism; in politics, these are inclined to libertarianism and in ethics tend to follow a scientistic approach. Collectivists have a more-applied view of humanism, lean toward socialism, and have a humanitarian approach to ethics. The second group has connections with the thought of young Marx, especially his anthropological views rejecting his political practices. A factor that repels many humanists from the libertarian view is the neoliberal or capitalistic consequences they feel it entails.

Humanism has been a part of both major 20th-century ideological currents—liberalism and Marxism. Early 19th-century socialism was connected to humanism. In the 20th century, a humanistic interpretation of Marxism focused on Marx's early writings, viewing Marxism not as "scientific socialism" but as a philosophical critique aimed at the overcoming of "alienation". In the US, liberalism is associated mostly with humanistic principles, which is distinct from the European use of the same word, which has economical connotations. In the post-1945 era, Jean-Paul Sartre and other French existentialists advocated for humanism, linking it to socialism while trying to stay neutral during the Cold War. Humanists International publishes the annual Freedom of Thought Report, which evaluates countries on rights and equality issues affecting humanists, atheists and other non-religious people.

=== In psychology and counseling ===
Humanist counseling is humanism-inspired applied psychology, which is a major current of counseling. There are various approaches such as discussion and critical thinking, replying to existential anxiety, and focusing on social and political dimensions of problems. Humanist counseling focuses on respecting the client's worldview and placing it in the correct cultural context. The approach emphasizes an individual's inherent drive towards self-actualization and creativity. It also recognizes the importance of moral questions about one's interactions with people according to one's worldview. This is examined using a process of dialogue. Humanist counseling originated in post-World War II Netherlands.

Humanistic counseling is based on the works of psychologists Carl Rogers and Abraham Maslow. It introduced a positive, humanistic psychology in response to what Rogers and Maslow viewed as the over-pessimistic view of psychoanalysis in the early 1960s. Other sources include the philosophies of existentialism and phenomenology.

Some modern counseling organizations have humanist origins, like the British Association for Counselling and Psychotherapy, which was founded by Harold Blackham, which he developed alongside the British Humanist Association's Humanist Counselling Service. Modern-day humanist pastoral care in the UK and the Netherlands draws on elements of humanistic psychology.

== Demographics ==
Demographic data about humanists is sparse. Scholar Yazmín Trejo examined the results of Pew Research Center's 2014 Religious Landscape Study. Trejo did not use self-identification to measure humanists but combined the answers of two questions: "Do you believe in God or a universal spirit?" (she chose those who answered 'no') and "when it comes to questions of right or wrong, which of the following do you look to most for guidance?" (picking answers 'scientific information' and 'philosophy and reason'). According to Trejo, most humanists in the United States identify as atheist or agnostic (37% and 18%), 29% as "nothing in particular", while 16% of humanists identify as religious. She also found most humanists (80%) were raised in a religious background. Sixty percent of humanists are married to non-religious spouses, while one quarter are married to a Christian. There is a gender divide among humanists: 67 percent are male. Trejo says this can be explained by the fact that more males self-identify as atheist, while women have stronger connections to religion because of socialization, community influence, and stereotypes; some women, especially Catholic Latinas, are expected to be religious and many of them abide by their community expectations. Other findings note the high level of education of most humanists, indicating a higher socioeconomic status. The population of humanists in the US is overwhelmingly non-Hispanic white; according to Trejo, this is because minority groups are usually very religious.

== Criticisms ==
=== Western and Christian ===
Criticism of humanism focus on its adherence to human rights, which some critics have called "Western". Critics say humanist values have become a tool of Western moral dominance, which is a form of neo-colonialism that leads to oppression and a lack of ethical diversity. Other critics, namely feminists, black activists, postcolonial critics, and gay and lesbian advocates, say humanism is an oppressive philosophy because it is not free from the biases of the white, heterosexual males who shaped it. History professor Samuel Moyn attacks humanism for its connection to human rights. According to Moyn, the concept of human rights in the 1960s was a declaration of anti-colonial struggle, but that idea was later transformed into an impossible utopian vision, replacing the failing utopias of the 20th century. The humanist use of human rights rhetoric thus turns human rights into a moral tool that is impractical and ultimately non-political. He also notes a commonality between humanism and the Catholic discourse on human dignity.

Anthropology professor Talal Asad argues humanism is a project of modernity and a secularized continuation of Western Christian theology. According to Asad, just as the Catholic Church passed the Christian doctrine of love to Africa and Asia while assisting in the enslavement of large parts of their population, humanist values have at times been a pretext for Western countries to expand their influence to other parts of the world to humanize "barbarians". Asad has also said humanism is not a purely secular phenomenon but takes the idea of the essence of humanity from Christianity. According to Asad, Western humanism cannot incorporate other humanistic traditions, such as those from India and China, without subsuming and ultimately eliminating them.

Sociology professor Didier Fassin has stated that humanism's focus on empathy and compassion, rather than goodness and justice, is a problem. According to Fassin, humanism originated in the Christian tradition, particularly the Parable of the Good Samaritan, in which empathy is universalized. Fassin has also argued that humanism's central essence, the sanctity of human life, is a religious victory hidden in a secular wrapper.

=== Amoral and materialistic ===
The main criticism from evangelical Christians, such as Tim LaHaye, is that humanism destroys traditional family and moral values. According to Corliss Lamont, this criticism is a malicious campaign by religious fanatics, the so-called Moral Majority, who need a demonic scapegoat to rally its followers. Other religious opponents scorn humanism by stating it is materialistic thereby diminishing humanity because it denies the spiritual nature and needs of man. Also, because the goal in life is the acquisition of material goods, humanism produces greed and selfishness. In response to this criticism Norman states that there is absolutely no reason why humanists should be committed to the view that the only things worth living for are 'material goods'. Such an accusation, he says, is based on a "sloppy" understanding of materialism. However, he does acknowledge a "tension" in humanism that because of its championing of scientific knowledge, it appears to be committed to a materialistic conception of human beings as physical systems and therefore as not much different from anything else in the universe.

=== Vague and indefinable ===
Humanism has frequently been criticised for its vagueness and the difficulty of defining the term. According to Paul Kurtz, "Humanism is so charged with levels of emotion and rhetoric that its meaning is often vague and ambiguous". For Giustiniani, "the meaning of ‘humanism’ has so many shades that to analyze all of them is hardly feasible". Nicolas Walter points out that most of the people in the past who have called themselves or been called humanists would reject many of today's tenets. The origins of humanism, he writes, "are so contradictory and confusing that it is often meaningless on its own". According to Tony Davies, "the meaning of ‘humanism’ is the semantic tangle, or grapple, that makes its meaning so difficult to grasp". While praising humanism, Sarah Bakewell describes it as "a semantic cloud of meanings and implications, none attachable to any particular theorist or practitioner". Andrew Copson proposes that some opponents of humanism have attempted to loosen or expand the definition deliberately to make it less coherent, noting that the suggestion deliberate attempts to promote the idea that there are two types of humanism – religious and secular – "has begun to seriously muddy the conceptual water".

Yet, the difficulty of defining humanism is not necessarily a problem. Davies avoids offering a definition, choosing instead "to stress the plurality, complexity and fluidity of meanings". Jeaneane Fowler argues that humanism is indefinable precisely because of its "particular dynamism" and the acknowledged vagueness of the term "far from being a disadvantage, is an asset". Bakewell likewise cites this as a strength.

=== Antihumanism ===
Antihumanism is a philosophical theory that rejects humanism as a pre-scientific ideology. This argument developed during the 19th and 20th centuries in parallel with the advancement of humanism. Prominent thinkers questioned the metaphysics of humanism and the human nature of its concept of freedom. Nietzsche, while departing from a humanistic, pro-Enlightenment viewpoint, criticized humanism for illusions on a number of topics, especially the nature of truth. According to Nietzsche, objective truth is an anthropomorphic illusion and humanism is meaningless, and replacing theism with reason and science simply replaces one religion with another.

After the atrocities of World War II, questions about human nature and the concept of humanity were renewed. During the Cold War, influential Marxist philosopher Louis Althusser introduced the term "theoretical antihumanism" to attack both humanism and humanist-like socialist currents, eschewing more structural and formal interpretations of Marx. According to Althusser, Marx's early writings resonate with the humanistic idealism of Hegel, Kant, and Feuerbach, but Marx radically moved toward scientific socialism in 1845, rejecting concepts such as the essence of man.

== Humanist organizations ==
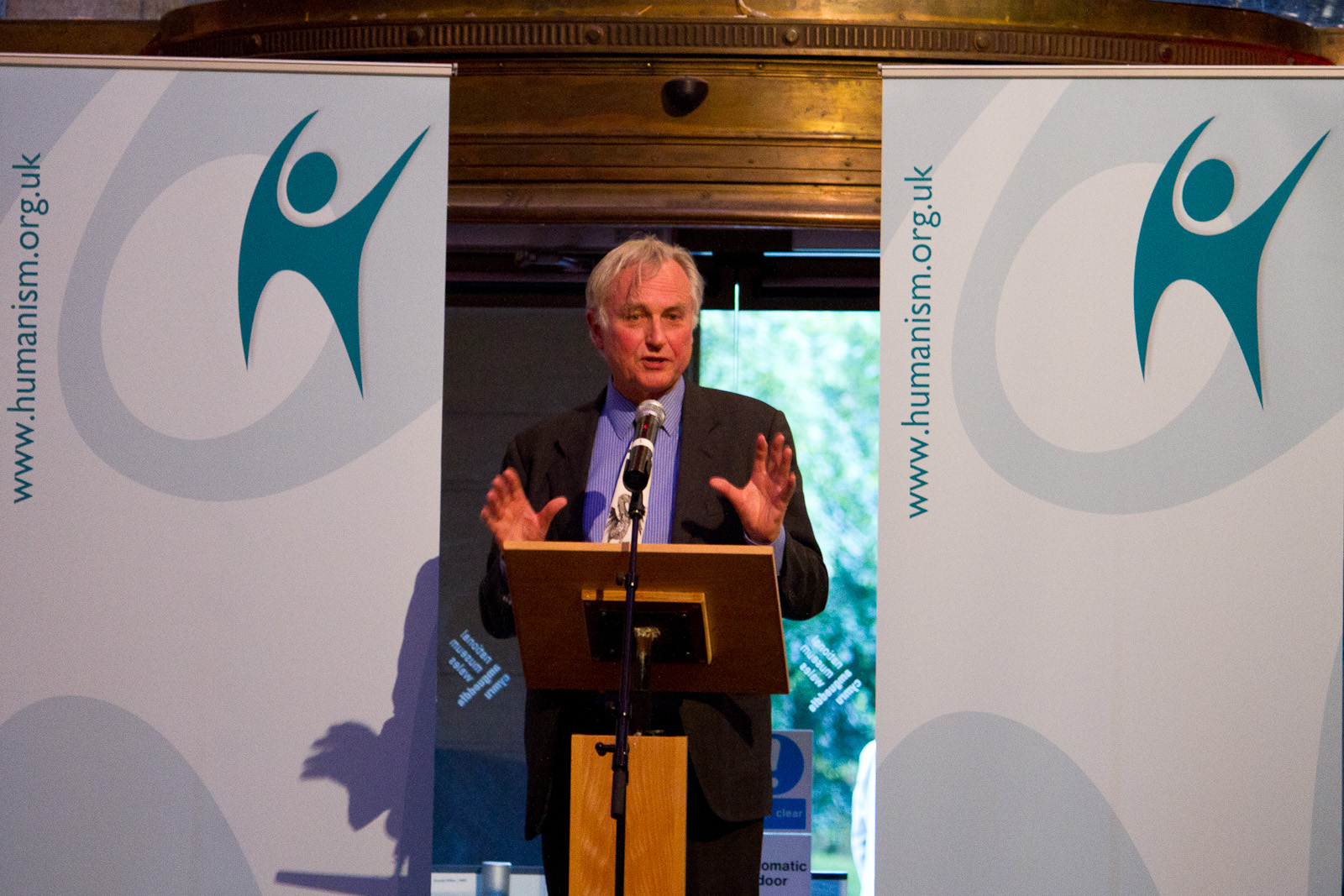
Richard Dawkins accepting the Services to Humanism award 2012 at the British Humanist Association Annual Conference

Humanist organizations exist in several countries. Humanists International is a global organization. The three countries with the highest numbers of Humanist International member organisations are the UK, India, and the US. The largest humanist organisation is the Norwegian Humanist Association.

Humanists UK (carrying this name since 2017, originating from Union of Ethical Societies of 1896, renamed Ethical Union in 1928 and British Humanist Association in 1967), the American Humanist Association (named since 1941, with roots to 1927 Humanist Fellowship) and the Dutch Humanistisch Verbond (1946) are three of the oldest humanist organizations.

In 2015, London-based Humanists UK had around 28,000 members. Its membership includes some high-profile people such as Richard Dawkins, Brian Cox, Salman Rushdie, Polly Toynbee, Alice Roberts and Stephen Fry, who are known for their participation in public debate, promoting secularism, and objecting to state funding for faith-based institutions. Humanists UK organizes and conducts non-religious ceremonies for weddings, namings, comings of age, and funerals.

The American Humanist Association (AHA) was formed in 1941 from previous humanist associations. Its journal The Humanist is the continuation of a previous publication The Humanist Bulletin. In 1953, the AHA established the "Humanist of the Year" award to honor individuals who promote science. By the 1970s, it became a well-recognized organization, initiating campaigns for abortion rights and opposing discriminatory policies. This resulted in the organization becoming a target of the religious right by the 1980s.

== See also ==
- Anthropocentrism – Worldview that humans are the most important beings
- Extropianism – Stance favoring continuous technological evolution and longer lifespans
- Humanistic Buddhism – Philosophy in Chinese Buddhism
- Humanistic economics – Distinct pattern of economic thought
- Humanistic Judaism – Nontheistic alternative to religious Judaism
- Christian humanism – Type of humanism
- Humanistic psychology – Psychological perspective
- List of humanists
- Fraternity (philosophy)
- Natural rights
- Paideia – Educational model once used in Athens
- Post-theism – Variant of nontheism
- Ubuntu
- Unitarian Universalism – Non-creedal liberal religious movement

== Sources ==
- Anthony, Andrew (27 October 2024). "Interview: Humanist chaplain Greg Epstein: 'Our bowed interactions with our phones look like worship'". The Guardian.
- Baker, Joseph O. (2020). "The Politics of Humanism". In Anthony B. Pinn (ed.). The Oxford Handbook of Humanism. Pemberton. pp. 1–20. doi:10.1093/oxfordhb/9780190921538.013.20. ISBN 978-0-19-092153-8.
- Barnes, Jonathan (1987). Early Greek Philosophy. Penguin Books. ISBN 978-0-14-044461-2. Archived from the original on 16 January 2023.
- Blackham, H. J. (1974). "A definition of humanism". In Paul Kurtz (ed.). The Humanist Alternative: Some Definitions of Humanism. Pemberton. ISBN 978-0-87975-013-8. Archived from the original on 16 January 2023.
- Butler, Philip (2020). "Humanism and the Conceptualization of Value and Well-Being". In Anthony B. Pinn (ed.). The Oxford Handbook of Humanism. Pemberton. pp. 644–664. doi:10.1093/oxfordhb/9780190921538.013.20. ISBN 978-0-19-092153-8. Archived from the original on 1 February 2022.
- Callado Estela, Emilio (2022). Tiempos de reforma: Pensamiento y religión en la época de Carlos V. ESIC. ISBN 9788411228411.
- Cherry, Matt (2009). "The Humanist Tradition". In Heiko Spitzeck (ed.). Humanism in Business. Shiban Khan, Ernst von Kimakowitz, Michael Pirson, Wolfgang Amann. Cambridge University Press. pp. 26–51. ISBN 978-0-521-89893-5. Archived from the original on 16 January 2023.
- Childers, Joseph W.; Hentzi, Gary (1995). The Columbia Dictionary of Modern Literary and Cultural Criticism. Columbia University Press. ISBN 978-0-231-07242-7. Archived from the original on 16 January 2023.
- Copson, Andrew (2015). "What is Humanism?". In A. C. Grayling (ed.). The Wiley Blackwell Handbook of Humanism. Andrew Copson. John Wiley & Sons. pp. 1–72. ISBN 978-1-119-97717-9. Archived from the original on 16 January 2023.
- Crosson, J. Brent (2020). "Humanism and Enlightenment". In Anthony B. Pinn (ed.). The Oxford Handbook of Humanism. Pemberton. pp. 1–35. doi:10.1093/oxfordhb/9780190921538.013.33. ISBN 978-0-19-092153-8.
- Curd, Patricia (2020). "Presocratic Philosophy". In Edward N. Zalta (ed.). Stanford Encyclopedia of Philosophy. Metaphysics Research Lab, Stanford University. Archived from the original on 16 January 2023.
- Davies, Tony (1997). Humanism. Psychology Press. ISBN 978-0-415-11052-5. Archived from the original on 16 January 2023.
- Dierksmeier, Claus (2011). "Kant's Humanist Ethics". In C. Dierksmeier; W. Amann; E. Von Kimakowitz; H. Spitzeck; M. Pirson; Ernst Von Kimakowitz (eds.). Humanistic Ethics in the Age of Globality. Springer. pp. 79–93. ISBN 978-0-230-31413-9. Archived from the original on 16 January 2023.
- Ellis, Brian (30 March 2010). "Humanism and Morality". Sophia. 50 (1). Springer Science and Business Media LLC: 135–139. doi:10.1007/s11841-010-0164-x. ISSN 0038-1527. S2CID 145380913.
- Engelke, Matthew (2015). "Humanist Ceremonies: The Case of Non-Religious Funerals in England". In A. C. Grayling (ed.). The Wiley Blackwell Handbook of Humanism. Andrew Copson. John Wiley & Sons. pp. 216–233. ISBN 978-1-119-97717-9. Archived from the original on 16 January 2023.
- Fowler, Jeaneane D. (1999). Humanism: Beliefs and Practices. Sussex Academic Press. ISBN 978-1-898723-70-7. Archived from the original on 16 January 2023.
- Fowler, Merv R (2015). "Ancient China". In A. C. Grayling (ed.). The Wiley Blackwell Handbook of Humanism. Andrew Copson. John Wiley & Sons. pp. 133–152. ISBN 978-1-119-97717-9. Archived from the original on 16 January 2023.
- Freeman, Charles R (2015). "Humanism in the Classical World". In A. C. Grayling (ed.). The Wiley Blackwell Handbook of Humanism. Andrew Copson. John Wiley & Sons. pp. 119–132. ISBN 978-1-119-97717-9. Archived from the original on 16 January 2023.
- Goodman, Lenn E. (2003). Islamic Humanism. Oxford University Press. ISBN 978-0-19-988500-8. Archived from the original on 16 January 2023.
- Grayling, A.C. (2015). "The Good and Worthwhile Life". In A. C. Grayling (ed.). The Wiley Blackwell Handbook of Humanism. Andrew Copson. John Wiley & Sons. pp. 87–84. ISBN 978-1-119-97717-9. Archived from the original on 16 January 2023.
- Giustiniani, Vito (April–June 1985). "Homo, Humanus, and the Meanings of 'Humanism'". Journal of the History of Ideas. 46 (2): 167–195. doi:10.2307/2709633. JSTOR 2709633.
- Harper, Douglas. "Humanism". Online Etymological Dictionary. Archived from the original on 16 January 2023.
- Jakelić, Slavica (2020). "Humanism and Its Critics". In Anthony B. Pinn (ed.). The Oxford Handbook of Humanism. Pemberton. pp. 264–293. doi:10.1093/oxfordhb/9780190921538.013.8. ISBN 978-0-19-092153-8. Archived from the original on 1 February 2022.
- Hardie, Glenn M (2000). "Humanist history: a selective review". Humanist in Canada (132). Gale Academic OneFile: 24–29, 38. Archived from the original on 16 January 2023.
- Haworth, Alan (2015). "Humanism and the Political Order". In A. C. Grayling (ed.). The Wiley Blackwell Handbook of Humanism. Andrew Copson. John Wiley & Sons. pp. 255–279. ISBN 978-1-119-97717-9. Archived from the original on 16 January 2023.
- Heavens, Timothy (2013). "Confucianism as humanism" (PDF). CLA Journal (1): 33–41. Archived (PDF) from the original on 2 February 2022.
- Hook, Sidney (1974). "The snare of definitions". In Paul Kurtz (ed.). The Humanist Alternative: Some Definitions of Humanism. Pemberton. ISBN 978-0-87975-013-8. Archived from the original on 16 January 2023.
- Huang, Chun-chien (2020). "Humanism in East Asia". In Anthony B. Pinn (ed.). The Oxford Handbook of Humanism. Pemberton. pp. 1–29. doi:10.1093/oxfordhb/9780190921538.013.31. ISBN 978-0-19-092153-8.
- The Humanist Society (2024). "Our History".
- Hussain, Khuram (2020). "Humanism in the Middle East". In Anthony B. Pinn (ed.). The Oxford Handbook of Humanism. Pemberton. pp. 1–17. doi:10.1093/oxfordhb/9780190921538.013.35. ISBN 978-0-19-092153-8.
- Kline, David (2020). "Humanism Against Religion". In Anthony B. Pinn (ed.). The Oxford Handbook of Humanism. Pemberton. pp. 224–244. doi:10.1093/oxfordhb/9780190921538.013.20. ISBN 978-0-19-092153-8.
- Kristeller, Paul Oskar (1978). "HUMANISM". Minerva. 16 (4). Springer: 586–595. doi:10.1007/BF01100334. eISSN 1573-1871. ISSN 0026-4695. JSTOR 41820353. Archived from the original on 16 January 2023.
- Kristeller, Paul Oskar (2008). "Humanism". In C. B. Schmitt; Quentin Skinner; Eckhard Kessler; Jill Kraye (eds.). The Cambridge Companion to Renaissance Philosophy. Cambridge University Press. pp. 111–138. ISBN 978-1-139-82748-5. Archived from the original on 16 January 2023.
- Kurtz, P. (1973). "Epilogue: Is Everyone a Humanist?". In Paul Kurtz (ed.). The Humanist Alternative: Some Definitions of Humanism. Pemberton. ISBN 0301-73041-5.
- Monfasani, John (2020). "Humanism and the Renaissance". In Anthony B. Pinn (ed.). The Oxford Handbook of Humanism. Oxford University Press. pp. 150–175. doi:10.1093/oxfordhb/9780190921538.013.30. ISBN 978-0-19-092153-8.
- Ljamai, Abdelilah (2015). "Humanistic Thought in the Islamic World of the Middle Ages". In A. C. Grayling (ed.). The Wiley Blackwell Handbook of Humanism. Andrew Copson. John Wiley & Sons. pp. 153–169. ISBN 978-1-119-97717-9. Archived from the original on 16 January 2023.
- Law, Stephen (2011). Humanism: A Very Short Introduction. OUP Oxford. ISBN 978-0-19-161400-2. Archived from the original on 16 January 2023.
- Law, Stephen (2015). "Science, Reason, and Scepticism". In A. C. Grayling (ed.). The Wiley Blackwell Handbook of Humanism. Andrew Copson. John Wiley & Sons. pp. 55–71. ISBN 978-1-119-97717-9. Archived from the original on 16 January 2023.
- Lamont, Corliss (1997). The Philosophy of Humanism. Continuum. ISBN 978-0-8044-6379-9. Archived from the original on 16 January 2023.
- Mann, Nicholas (1996). "The origins of humanism". In Jill Kraye (ed.). The Cambridge Companion to Renaissance Humanism. Cambridge University Press. ISBN 978-0-521-43624-3. Archived from the original on 16 January 2023.
- Masolo, D.A. (2020). "Humanism in Africa". In Anthony B. Pinn (ed.). The Oxford Handbook of Humanism. Pemberton. pp. 1–30. doi:10.1093/oxfordhb/9780190921538.013.28. ISBN 978-0-19-092153-8.
- Morain, Lloyd; Morain, Mary (1998). Humanism as the Next Step. Humanist Press. ISBN 978-0-931779-09-1.
- Nederman, Cary (8 September 2020). Edward N. Zalta (ed.). "Civic Humanism". Stanford Encyclopedia of Philosophy (Fall 2020 ed.). Archived from the original on 12 September 2021.
- Nida-Rümelin, Julian (2009). "Philosophical grounds of humanism in economics". In Heiko Spitzeck (ed.). Humanism in Business. Shiban Khan, Ernst von Kimakowitz, Michael Pirson, Wolfgang Amann. Cambridge University Press. ISBN 978-0-521-89893-5. Archived from the original on 16 January 2023.
- Norman, Richard (2004). On Humanism. Routledge. ISBN 978-1-136-70659-2. Archived from the original on 16 January 2023.
- Norman, Richard (2012). On Humanism. Second Edition. Routledge. ISBN 978-1-136-70659-2.
- Norman, Richard (2015). "Life Without Meaning?". In A. C. Grayling (ed.). The Wiley Blackwell Handbook of Humanism. Andrew Copson. John Wiley & Sons. pp. 325–246. ISBN 978-1-119-97717-9. Archived from the original on 16 January 2023.
- Rohlf, Michael (2020). Edward N. Zalta (ed.). "Immanuel Kant". Stanford Encyclopedia of Philosophy. Archived from the original on 23 October 2022.
- Savage, David (2021). "The Development of Non-Religious Pastoral Support in the UK". Religions. 12 (10): 812. doi:10.3390/rel12100812.
- Schröder, Stefan (2020). "Humanism in Europe". In Anthony B. Pinn (ed.). The Oxford Handbook of Humanism. Pemberton. pp. 1–24. doi:10.1093/oxfordhb/9780190921538.013.32. ISBN 978-0-19-092153-8.
- Schuhmann, Carmen (2015). "Counselling and the Humanist Worldview". In A. C. Grayling (ed.). The Wiley Blackwell Handbook of Humanism. Andrew Copson. John Wiley & Sons. pp. 173–193. ISBN 978-1-119-97717-9. Archived from the original on 16 January 2023.
- Schuhmann, C. M.; Wojtkowiak, J.; van Lierop, R.; Pitstra, F. (2021). "Humanist chaplaincy according to Northwestern European humanist chaplains: towards a framework for understanding chaplaincy in secular societies". Journal of Health Care Chaplaincy. 27 (4): 207–221.
- Scott, James Brown (2000). The Spanish Origin of International Law: Francisco de Vitoria and His Law of Nations. The Lawbook Exchange, Ltd. ISBN 978-1-58477-110-4.
- Shook, John R (2015). "Humanism, Moral Relativism, and Ethical Objectivity". In A. C. Grayling (ed.). The Wiley Blackwell Handbook of Humanism. Andrew Copson. John Wiley & Sons. pp. 403–425. ISBN 978-1-119-97717-9. Archived from the original on 16 January 2023.
- Soper, Kate (1986). Humanism and Anti-humanism. Open Court. ISBN 978-0-8126-9017-0. Archived from the original on 16 January 2023.
- Trejo, A.G. Yasmin (2020). "Changing demographics of humanism". In Anthony B. Pinn (ed.). The Oxford Handbook of Humanism. Pemberton. pp. 1–25. doi:10.1093/oxfordhb/9780190921538.013.15. ISBN 978-0-19-092153-8.
- Walker, Corey D. B. (2020). "Humanism and the Modern Age". In Anthony B. Pinn (ed.). The Oxford Handbook of Humanism. Pemberton. pp. 1–18. doi:10.1093/oxfordhb/9780190921538.013.17. ISBN 978-0-19-092153-8.
- White, Carol Wyene (2020). "Humanism in the Americas". In Anthony B. Pinn (ed.). The Oxford Handbook of Humanism. Pemberton. pp. 1–40. doi:10.1093/oxfordhb/9780190921538.013.11. ISBN 978-0-19-092153-8.
- Wilson, Edwin H. (1974). "Humanism's many definitions". In Paul Kurtz (ed.). The Humanist Alternative: Some Definitions of Humanism. Pemberton. ISBN 978-0-87975-013-8. Archived from the original on 16 January 2023.
- Yao, Xinzhong (2000). An Introduction to Confucianism. Cambridge University Press. pp. 15–25. ISBN 978-0-521-64430-3. Archived from the original on 16 January 2023.
