= Richard Norman =

Richard Norman may refer to:

- Richard Norman (chemist), British chemist
- Richard Norman (philosopher), British academic, philosopher and humanist
- Richard Norman, founder of movie production company Norman Studios in the U.S.
- Dick Norman (American football) (Richard Michael Norman), American football quarterback
- Richard Edward Norman, American filmmaker who headed Norman Studios

== See also ==
- Dick Norman, tennis player from Belgium
- Rick Norman, Australian rules footballer
