= Anthony B. Pinn =

American professor (born 1964)

- Born: 2 May 1964 (age 62); Buffalo, New York
- Education: Harvard University, Ph.D. (1994), M.Div, M.A. Columbia University, B.A.
- Known for: Black theology, African American Humanism, Humanism, African American Religious Studies
- Scientific career
- Fields: Constructive Theology, Religious Studies
- Workplaces: Rice University (2003- ), Macalester College (1995-2003)

Anthony B. Pinn is an American professor working at the intersections of African-American religion, constructive theology, and humanist thought. Pinn is the Agnes Cullen Arnold Professor of Humanities and Professor of Religious Studies at Rice University. He is founder and executive director of the Center for Engaged Research and Collaborative Learning in Houston, Texas, and the Director of Research for the Institute for Humanist Studies in Washington, D.C.

He graduated from Columbia University with a B.A. in 1986, and earned his Ph.D. in the Study of Religion at Harvard University in 1994. His dissertation was entitled "I Wonder as I Wander: An Examination of the Problem of Evil in African-American Religious Thought."

== Black humanism in relation to other religious traditions ==
Pinn refers to his approach to humanism as a "religion." In so doing, Pinn cites humanist Gordon Kaufman's definition of religion as "that which helps humans find orientation 'for life in the world, together with motivation for living and acting in accordance with this orientation.'" In other words, for Pinn, religion need not be theistic.

In Why Lord?, Pinn's humanism "involves an increase in humanity's importance which makes impossible the location of a space for God." He continues, "Religious answers to life's meaninglessness promote an embracing of suffering which reinforces life's meaninglessness rather than ending it."

In a 1997 essay, Pinn describes humanism as another contribution to the plurality of religious traditions. In Varieties of African American Religious Experience (1999), he acknowledges that "the needs of various human communities are complex and varied enough to allow for a plurality of religious traditions." In a 2002 interview, Pinn states that the Black Church, although in crisis, "has tremendous potential" for addressing the social justice issues that affect African Americans. Although Pinn's work reaches into non-Christian sources of theology, much of his academic focus remains centered on the history and theology of the African-American Christian Church.

Pinn differentiates Black humanism from other non-theistic worldviews such as atheism. Citing the work of Jean-Paul Sartre and Richard Wright, Pinn notes that Black humanism has no interest in disproving the existence of God. Rather, it is "not overly concerned with God as a negative myth, but rather God as a liberating myth that is nonetheless unsubstantiated." Thus, oppressed African Americans need not waste their time disproving God's existence, but are simply better off seeking their liberation with the human tools of "desire for transformation, human creativity, physical strength, and untapped collective potential."

== Pinn's approach to theodicy, redemptive suffering, and Black humanism ==
In Why Lord? Suffering and Evil in Black Theology (1995), Anthony Pinn establishes himself as a black theologian and Black humanist. In Why Lord?, Pinn seeks to critique various responses found within Black religion to the question of theodicy, or God's role in the suffering of humanity. His critique is based on the ultimate goal of Black liberation. Pinn cites John Hick's options for "the resolution of the problem of evil," which are the following: "(1) a rethinking of the nature/purpose of evil; or, (2) the postulating of a 'limited' God; or, (3) a questioning/denial of God's existence."

The solutions that Black theology has formally articulated, Pinn argues, have essentially been limited to the first two options. All theodicean arguments following the first approach are not useful in the struggle for the liberation of oppressed people because, to varying degrees, they all rely on the concept of redemptive suffering.

Pinn considers these arguments "unacceptable because they counteract efforts at liberation by finding something of value in Black suffering." He places the work of James H. Cone, an early promulgator of Black theology, in the first category. Although Cone refuses to accept Black suffering as God's will, he nonetheless embraces suffering which Blacks incur as a result of resistance to oppression. Pinn rejects this distinction between positive and negative suffering, which he calls purely academic. Instead, a Black theology of liberation must characterize suffering "as unquestionably and unredeemably evil."

Pinn follows the thinking of existentialist writer Albert Camus, who rejects theodicean arguments for God limiting God's own intervention, arguing that "if God is omnipotent and permits human suffering, then God is a murderer." Theodicean arguments based on the postulating of a limited God, as presented by William R. Jones and Delores Williams, are not valid at all, as Pinn questions the efficacy and worth of worship and action in the service of a limited, ultimately ineffective deity.

Rather, Pinn proposes that Black theologians examine the third theodicean solution: the questioning or denial of God's existence. In this approach, Pinn draws on William R. Jones' important work Is God a White Racist? (1998), which questions God's goodness. He ultimately takes this point farther than Jones, arguing that if God exists and is self-limiting in God's support for Black liberation, as Jones concludes, God is indeed a racist.

Pinn describes his approach as fundamentally pragmatic: where faith in God entails a justification of human suffering, he "would rather lose God than human value." James H. Cone writes that "Black theology must relate itself to the human situation unique to oppressed persons generally and blacks particularly. If black theology fails to do this adequately, then the black community will and should destroy it."

To this end, Pinn advocates a position of "strong humanism," a non-theistic religion that concerns itself, above all, with human life, while rejecting the existence of God.

In 2017, Pinn published a book, When Colorblindness Isn't the Answer: Humanism and the Challenge of Race, on why humanists should embrace racial justice.

== Sources of theology ==
Pinn draws on a variety of historical traditions in the formation of his religion of Black humanism. Examples from Black folk stories and jokes, spirituals, blues, rap, and political discourse form the basis of Pinn's work. In his analysis of these diverse sources, Pinn employs what he terms "nitty-gritty hermeneutics," an approach to theological thought that is constructed from the hard realities of human experience, unconfined by a need to fit into preconceived Christian doctrines. In other words, nitty-gritty hermeneutics privilege solutions to the problem of oppression over the maintenance of religious tradition.

In his analysis of often overtly Christian sources, Pinn finds meaningful support for the historical legitimacy of Black humanism. The tradition of spirituals, communally composed by African slaves in the United States, provides an early study in Black theodicy, questioning the purpose of slaves' suffering. He quotes Daniel Payne, a leader in the African Methodist Episcopal Church, who in 1839 wrote about the extent to which slaves, aware of the hypocrisy of their Christian masters, "distrust both the goodness and justice of God."

Pinn quotes a runaway slave, who said he was not a Christian because "white men treat us so bad in Mississippi that we can't be Christians."

In "Anybody There? Reflections on African American Humanism", Pinn acknowledges the importance of the work of theologians such as James H. Cone in the 1960s and 1970s. He states that Cone's early writings, which presented theological arguments for Black power and liberation, ultimately became part of the separation between the Christian-based Civil Rights Movement and the more radical Black Power movement.

In Varieties of African-American Religious Experience, Pinn considers a wide range of non-Christian theological sources, including "Voodoo, Orisha devotion, Santeria, the Nation of Islam, and Black Humanism," and advocates a broader understanding of African-American "sources, norms, and doctrines" beyond the Protestant church.

== Awards and Honors ==
1999 - Council on Secular Humanism's African American Humanist Award

2006 - Harvard's Chaplaincy Humanist of the year award

== Publications ==
Book Series:

1. Caroline Levander and Anthony B. Pinn, Imagining the Americas, Oxford University Press.
2. Anthony B. Pinn and Katie G. Cannon, Innovations in African American Religious Thought, Fortress Press.
3. Stacey Floyd-Thomas and Anthony B. Pinn, Religion and Social Transformation, New York University Press.
4. Anthony B. Pinn, Studies in Humanist Thought and Practice, Acumen Press.
5. Anthony B. Pinn, When Colorblindness Isn't the Answer: Humanism and the Challenge of Race, Pitchstone Publishing, 2017

Encyclopedias:

1. Anthony B. Pinn, General Editor. The Encyclopedia of African American Religious Culture, 2 Volumes,(ABC-CLIO, 2009).

Monographs:

1. Why Lord? Suffering and Evil in Black Theology, Continuum Press (1995)
2. Varieties of African American Religious Experience, Fortress Press (1998)
3. Co-authored with Anne H. Pinn, The Fortress Introduction to Black Church History, Fortress Press (Fall 2001).
4. The Black Church in the Post-Civil Rights Era, Orbis Books (Spring 2002, 2nd Printing May 2003, 3rd Printing May 2004).
5. Terror and Triumph: The Nature of Black Religion, Fortress Press (Spring 2003).
6. African American Humanist Principles: Living and Thinking Like the Children of Nimrod, Palgrave Macmillan (Fall 2004).
7. The African American Religious Experience in America, Greenwood Press, (Winter 2005). Paperback by University Press of Florida (October 2007).
8. Becoming 'America's Problem Child': An Outline of Pauli Murray's Religious Life and Theology, Princeton Theological Monograph Series (PickWick Publications) (August 2008).
9. Understanding and Transforming the Black Church, Cascade Books (Winter 2010).
10. Embodiment and the New Shape of Black Theological Thought, New York University Press, (June 2010).
11. What is African American Religion?, Fortress Press (Summer 2011).
12. The End of God-Talk: An African American Humanist Theology, Oxford University Press (Spring 2012).
13. Introducing African American Religion, Routledge (Fall 2012).
14. Writing Gods Obituary: How a Good Methodist Became a Better Atheist Prometheus Books (Winter 2014).

Edited Volumes:

1. Anthony B. Pinn, editor. Making the Gospel Plain: The Writings of Bishop Reverdy C. Ransom, Trinity Press International, (Spring 1999).
2. Stephen Angell and Anthony B. Pinn, editors. Protest Thought in the African Methodist Episcopal Church, 1862-1939, Vol. 1, University of Tennessee Press, (Spring 2000).
3. Anthony B. Pinn and Benjamin Valentin, editors. The Ties That Bind: African-American and Hispanic-American/Latino Theologies in Dialogue, The Continuum Publishing Group, (Spring 2001).
4. Anthony B. Pinn, editor. By These Hands: A Documentary History of African American Humanism, New York University Press, (Fall 2001).
5. Anthony B. Pinn, editor. Moral Evil and Redemptive Suffering: A History of Theodicy in African American Religious Thought. The University Press of Florida, (Spring 2002).
6. Rebecca Moore, Anthony B. Pinn, and Mary R. Sawyer, editors. Peoples Temple and Black Religion in America, Indiana University Press (Spring 2004).
7. Anthony B. Pinn, editor. Noise and Spirit: Rap Music's Religious and Spiritual Sensibilities, New York University Press (Fall 2004).
8. Anthony B. Pinn and Dwight N. Hopkins, editors. Loving the Body: Black Religious Studies and the Erotic, Palgrave Macmillan (Fall 2004; Paper, Fall 2006).
9. Anthony B. Pinn, editor. Pauli Murray: Selected Sermons and Writings, Orbis Books (Spring 2006).
10. Anthony B. Pinn and Allen D. Callahan, editors. African American Religious Life and the Story of Nimrod, Palgrave Macmillan (Winter 2007).
11. Anthony B. Pinn, editor. Black Religion and Aesthetics: Religious Thought and Life in Africa and the African Diaspora, Palgrave Macmillan (Summer 2009).
12. Anthony B. Pinn and Benjamin Valentin, editors, Creating Ourselves: African Americans and Latino/as, Popular Culture, and Religious Expression, Duke University Press (Fall 2009).
13. Anthony B. Pinn and Stacey M. Floyd-Thomas, editors. Liberation Theologies in the United States: An Introduction, New York University Press (March 2010).
14. Anthony B. Pinn, Caroline Levander, Michael Emerson, editors, Teaching and Studying the Americas, Palgrave Macmillan (Fall 2010).
15. Anthony B. Pinn, editor, What Is Humanism, and Why Does It Matter?, Acumen, (Winter 2013).

Journal Special Issues:

1. Anthony B. Pinn, guest editor. "African American Religion Symposium." Nova Religio: The Journal of Alternative and Emergent Religions, Volume 7, Number 1 (July 2003).
2. Anthony B. Pinn and Monica Miller, co-guest editors, special issue on Religion and Hip Hop Culture, Culture and Religion, Volume 10, Issue 1 (March 2009).
3. Anthony B. Pinn, guest editor. "The Colors of Humanism," a special issue of Essays in the Philosophy of Humanism, Volume 20, Number 1 (June 2012).
