= Brian David Ellis =

Australian philosopher (1929–2025)

Brian David Ellis FAHA
- Born: 29 September 1929; Adelaide, Australia
- Died: 21 November 2025 (aged 96); Eltham, Victoria, Australia

Education
- Education: University of Adelaide; University of Oxford; La Trobe University
- Academic advisor: H. H. Price

Philosophical work
- Era: Contemporary philosophy
- Region: Western philosophy
- School: Analytic
- Institutions: La Trobe University; University of Melbourne
- Doctoral students: Frank Cameron Jackson
- Main interests: Philosophy of science, metaphysics
- Notable ideas: New essentialism

Brian David Ellis (27 September 1929 – 21 November 2025) was an Australian philosopher. He was a professor in the philosophy department at La Trobe University in Victoria, Australia, and Professional Fellow in philosophy at the University of Melbourne. He was the Editor of the Australasian Journal of Philosophy for twelve years. Ellis was one of the major proponents of the new essentialist school of philosophy of science. In later years he brought his understanding of scientific realism to the Social Sciences, developing the philosophy of Social Humanism. He was appointed a Fellow of the Australian Academy of the Humanities in 1972.

Ellis died on 21 November 2025, at the age of 96.

== Philosophical work ==
=== New essentialism ===
The new essentialism is a comprehensive philosophy of nature. Philosophers around the world, including Sydney Shoemaker, Charles Martin, George Molnar, George Bealer, John Bigelow, Caroline Lierse, Evan Fales, Crawford Elder, Nicholas Maxwell, Nancy Cartwright, Roy Bhaskar and John Heil, have contributed to in various ways to its development. The new essentialism is an emerging metaphysical perspective that is the culmination of many different attempts to arrive at a satisfactory post-Humean philosophy of nature.

However, this list of claimed allies has been disputed by Stephen Mumford, at least with regard to Shoemaker, Martin, Molnar, Heil and Cartwright.

=== "Causal Powers and Categorical Properties" ===
In the chapter "Causal Powers and Categorical Properties" of The Metaphysics of Powers: Their Grounding and Their Manifestations, Ellis argues that categorical properties and causal powers are distinct from one another, and that categorical properties are not dispositional, but quiddities. Quidditism accounts for identity of a property based only on what it is rather than what it disposes its bearer to do. Although categorical properties do not necessarily dispose their bearers to do anything, they do determine where active properties of things may exist, or be distributed, and thus where the effects of such activities can be observed. He gives a detailed logical account of how a causal power can be defined. Ellis defines a causal power as a quantitative property that positions its bearer in specific circumstances to take part in a physical causal process with a certain outcome. Such powers are to either act or resist change within the bearer (e.g. temperature, elasticity).

All causal powers must meet two criteria. First, they must all have contingent locations, since they have to act from somewhere. Second, they all must have laws of action outlining their nature. Such laws reference both the location of the object that possesses the power, as well as the location of things it interacts with. Locations, however, are impotent. Ellis argues that neither locations nor categorical properties such as shape and size are causal powers, yet they can make a difference in outcomes.

== Publications ==
=== Articles ===
- "Basic concepts of measurement". Physics Today. American Institute of Physics, 1966.
- "Causal Laws and Singular Causation". Philosophy and Phenomenological Research. 61:329–351. Wiley-Blackwell, 2000.
- "Critical Notice of Scientific Realism: How Science Tracks the Truth by Stathis Psillos". Philosophy and Phenomenological Research. 68:495–497. Wiley-Blackwell, 2004.
- "Has the Universe a Beginning in Time?". Australasian Journal of Philosophy 32–37. Routledge, 1955.
- "History and Philosophy of Science". Idealist Origins: 1920s and Before. 707–772. Springer Netherlands, 2014.
- "Humanism and Morality". Sophia: an International Journal for Philosophical Theology and Cross-Cultural Philosophy of Religion. 50:135–139. Springer Verlag, 2011.
- “I can if I choose” Analysis 12(6) :128-129 June 1952
- "Internal Realism". Synthese. 76: 409–434. Springer Verlag, 1988.
- "Katzav on the Limitations of Dispositionalism". Analysis. 65(285). Oxford University Press, 2005.
- "Marc Lange on Essentialism". Australasian Journal of Philosophy. 83:75–79. Routledge, 2005.
- "Physical Realism". Ratio: an International Journal of Analytic Philosophy. 18:371–384. Wiley, 2005.
- "Retrospective and Prospective Utilitarianism". Nous. 15: 325–328. Wiley, 1981.
- "Scientific Platonism". Studies in History and Philosophy of Science Part A. 23:665–679. Elsevier, 1992.
- "Two Theories of Indicative Conditionals". Australian Journal of Philosophy. 62: 50–66. Routledge, 1984.
- "Truth and Objectivity". Philosophy and Phenomenological Research. Wiley, 1993.
- "Universals, the Essential Problem and Categorical Properties". Ratio: an International Journal of Analytic Philosophy. 18:462–472. Wiley, 2005.
- "What Science Aims to Do". Images of Science: Essays on Realism and Empiricism. 48–74. University of Chicago Press, 1985.

=== Books ===
- Basic Concepts of Measurement, Cambridge University Press, 1966
- Labor's Historic Mission, Vol.1. Vic Australian Scholarly Publishing, 2015.
- The Metaphysics of Scientific Realism. McGill-Queen's University Press, 2009.
- The New Enlightenment; Steven Pinker and Beyond, with contributed essays by A. Lynch, G. Bailey, and G. Polya. Melbourne; Australian Scholarly Publishing, 2019
- The Philosophy of Nature: A Guide to the New Essentialism. McGill-Queen's University Press, 2002.
- Rational Belief Systems, Blackwell, Oxford, 1979
- Rationalism: A Critique of Pure Theory. Melbourne; Australian Scholarly Publishing, 2017
- Scientific Essentialism. Cambridge University Press, 2001.
- Social Demand: and How to Provide for It, Vol.2. Vic Australian Scholarly Publishing, 2016.
- Social Humanism: A New Metaphysics. Routledge, 2012.
- "Truth and Objectivity". Philosophy and Phenomenological Research. Wiley, 1993
- On Civilizing Capitalism Springer, 2023

=== Chapters ===
- "The Categorical Dimensions of the Causal Powers". Properties, Powers and Structures: Issues in the Metaphysics of Realism. 11–26. Routledge, 2012.
- "Causal Powers and Categorical Properties". The Metaphysics of Powers: Their Grounding and Their Manifestations. 133–142. Routledge, 2010.
- “Causal Powers and Structures” in Hill, B; Lagerlund, H and Psillos, S (eds) Reconsidering Causal Powers: Historical and Conceptual Perspectives, Ch 11. Oxford University Press 2021.
- "Constructing an Ontology". Topics on General and Formal Ontology. 15–26. Polimetrica, 2006.
- "From Conventionalism to Scientific Metaphysics". History of Philosophy in Australia and New Zealand. 329–359. Springer Netherlands, 2014.
- "A Review Essay on God, Chance and Necessity". Sophia, 38. 311–316. Springer Verlag, 2007.
- "History and Philosophy of Science". Idealist Origins: 1920s and Before. 707–772. Springer Netherlands, 2014.
- "Human Agency, Realism and the New Essentialism". Australian Studies in History and Philosophy of Science. 193–208. Springer Dordrecht, 2002.
- La Trobe University. 238–242. 2010.
- La Trobe University. 248–252. 2014.
- "Universals, the Essential Problem and Categorical Properties". Ratio. 88–97. Wiley, 2006.
