= Crawford Elder =

Professor of philosophy

- Born: 1949 (age 76–77)

Academic background
- Education: Yale University (B.A., PhD)
- Thesis: Towards a Revised Hegelian Theory of Nature (1975)
- Doctoral advisor: J. N. Findlay, David Carr

Academic work
- Era: Contemporary philosophy
- Region: Western philosophy
- School or tradition: German Idealism
- Institutions: University of Connecticut

Crawford Latterner Elder (born 1949) is an American professor emeritus of philosophy at University of Connecticut.

== Life ==
Elder received his B.A. in philosophy Summa cum Laude, Phi Beta Kappa in 1970, and his PhD in 1975 both from Yale University, receiving the Tew Award. The title of his dissertation was Towards a Revised Hegelian Theory of Nature which was defended under the direction of J. N. Findlay and David Carr (phenomenologist). He joined University of Connecticut as an instructor in 1974 where he became an assistant professor in 1976, associate professor in 1980 and full professor in 1987. He was head of the philosophy department from 1994 until July 2012 and subsequently became retired in December 2012. He became professor emeritus in January 2013.

== Publications ==
- Elder, Crawford L. (2011). Familiar Objects and their Shadows. Cambridge Studies in Philosophy. Cambridge: Cambridge University Press. doi:10.1017/CBO9780511760129. ISBN 978-1-107-00323-1.
- Elder, Crawford L. (2004). Real Natures and Familiar Objects. The MIT Press. doi:10.7551/mitpress/5792.001.0001. ISBN 978-0-262-27226-1.
- Elder, Crawford (1980). Appropriating Hegel. Internet Archive. [Aberdeen] : Aberdeen University Press. ISBN 978-0-08-025729-7.
