= Margret Grebowicz =

Polish philosopher (born 1973)

- Born: Małgorzata E. Grebowicz; 1973 (age 52–53); Łódź, Poland

Academic background
- Education: University of Texas at Austin (B.A., 1994); Emory University (M.A. 1998; Ph.D., 2001)
- Thesis: Without a Knowing Subject: Thought, Responsibility and The “Future” of Science (2001)
- Doctoral advisor: David Carr
- Other advisor: Jean-François Lyotard

Academic work
- Institutions: University of Houston–Downtown; University of Dundee; Goucher College; University of Tyumen; University of Silesia in Katowice; Missouri University of Science and Technology

Margret Grebowicz (born 1973) is a Polish philosopher, author, and former jazz vocalist. She is a professor of philosophy at Missouri University of Science and Technology. In addition to peer-reviewed academic publications, Grebowicz, a proponent of public humanities, also publishes many works for the lay audience.

== Early life and education ==
Grebowicz is originally from Łódź, Poland but was raised in Texas. In 1994, she earned a bachelor's degree in German literature, philosophy, and art history from the University of Texas at Austin. While completing her undergraduate degree, Grebowicz worked in record stores. She completed a Master of Arts degree from Emory University in 1998. In 2001, she earned a doctorate in philosophy at Emory University where she studied under Jean-François Lyotard. She completed her dissertation on late 20th century French philosophy and Anglo-American philosophy of science with doctoral advisor David Carr.

== Career ==
After her doctorate, Grebowicz taught at University of Houston–Downtown and wrote papers on feminist epistemology, radical democracy, French philosophy, and visual culture. She also translated poetry from Polish into English, including works by Ewa Lipska. In September 2003, she sang in her debut performance as the lead vocalist for the bossa nova Brazilian jazz group Com Você. Grebowicz had previously not sung since she was a child. She performs songs in English and Portuguese. In 2010, Grebowicz released an album called Com Você with Sunnyside Records along with musicians, Stan Killian, Ben Monder, Matvei Sigalov, Viviane Arnoux, and Scott Colley.

In 2010, she was a Leverhulme Fellow at University of Dundee where she researched Internet pornography and political ontology. From 2010 to 2017, Grebowicz was a jazz vocalist living in New York City and worked as an associate professor of philosophy at Goucher College, and also was an affiliate faculty of the Goucher environmental studies program. In May 2018, Grebowicz announced that she was leaving Goucher. Since 2020, Grebowicz has been an associate professor at the University of Silesia in Katowice, Poland. Her recent essays have appeared in The Atlantic, Slate, and The Philosophical Salon.

Grebowicz is the editor of Practices, a forthcoming book series from Duke University Press. Other forthcoming publications include Lyotard and Critical Practice, (Bloomsbury Publishing, 2022); and Rescue Me, a short book about dog owner culture (University of Minnesota Press, 2022).

She serves on the executive committee of the International Association for Environmental Philosophy.

== Personal life ==
From 2010 to 2017, Grebowicz resided in New York City.

== Selected works ==
=== Books ===
- Kinloch, Valerie; Grebowicz, Margret (2005). Still Seeking an Attitude: Critical Reflections on the Work of June Jordan. Contributed by Christina Accomando. Lexington Books.
- Grebowicz, Margret, ed. (2007). Gender after Lyotard. SUNY Press. ISBN 978-0791480779.
- Grebowicz, Margret (2007). SciFi in the Mind's Eye: Reading Science Through Science Fiction. University of Michigan. ISBN 978-0812696301.
- Grebowicz, Margret (2013). Why Internet Porn Matters. Stanford University Press. ISBN 978-0804786621.
- Grebowicz, Margret (2013). Beyond the Cyborg: Adventures with Donna Haraway. Columbia University Press. ISBN 978-0231520737.
- Grebowicz, Margret (2015). The National Park to Come. Stanford University Press. ISBN 978-0804793421.
- Grebowicz, Margret (2017). Whale Song. Bloomsbury Publishing USA. ISBN 978-1501329265.
- Grebowicz, Margret (2021). Mountains and Desire. Repeater Books. ISBN 978-1912248933.
- Grebowicz, Margret and Bamford, Kiff (eds 2022) Lyotard and Critical Practice, Bloomsbury. ISBN 978-1-350-19202-7
- Grebowicz, Margret (2022). Rescue Me: On Dogs and Their Humans. University of Minnesota Press. ISBN 978-1517914608.

=== Discography ===
- Com Você (CD) (in English and Portuguese). Sunnyside Records. 2010. OCLC 687734829.
