= Thomas Howes (cleric) =

English scholar and minister

Thomas Howes, Reverend (October 1728 - 29 September 1814) was an English literary scholar, historian and minister. Little is known of his life except his 4-volume book, Critical Observations on Books, Antient and Modern, published from 1776 onwards, which is an early example of the single-authored scholarly journal. The book was largely ignored in its own time, but merits reappraisal for its intriguing genre.

Howes was one of Joseph Priestley's main opponents in the so-called Unitarian disputes of the 1780s.

== Early life and education ==
Thomas Howes was born at Thorndon, the only son of Thomas Howes of Morningthorpe, Norfolk, and Elizabeth Colman. He studied at Clare Hall, Cambridge and graduated with a B.A. in 1746. He took holy orders and after serving curacies in London he held the crown rectory of Morningthorpe from 1756.

== Later life and writings ==
After the death of his father in 1771, he moved back to Thorndon. He wrote several books, particularly his 4-volume Critical Observations on Books, Antient (sic) and Modern.

=== Critical Observations on Books, Antient and Modern ===
The book was published in four volumes, but as noted by David Chandler, the book also includes irregular numbered parts (I to XIII), surviving copies of the book are incomplete and sometimes wrongly bound, all of which "presents a daunting bibliographical problem". The following descriptions of the contents of the four volumes is based on available online versions.

==== Volume 1 ====
Published in 1776 consisting of the following sections:

1. An examination of Mr. Wood's essay concerning the genius of Homer.
2. Remarks concerning Dr. Henry's History of Britain, Whitaker's History of Manchester, Bertram's Edition of Richardus of Cirencester, and Horsley's Antiquities, tending to illustrate the State of Scotland under the Romans.

==== Volume 2 ====
Published in 1783 consisting of the following sections:

1. Conjectures concerning the Meaning of the word Venta, in Roman Names of Cities in Britain.
2. Remarks on the Translation of a Passage concerning the Dates of a lunar Eclipse, in lbn. Younes's History of Celestial Observations.
3. Remarks on Mr. Richardson's dissertation on the Literature of Eastern Nations, so far as respects Jewish and Persian History.
4. Doubts concerning the Translation and Notes of the Bishop of London to Isaiah, vindicating Ezechiel, Isaiah, and other Jewish Prophets from Disorder in Arrangement.

==== Volume 3 ====
Published in 1784 consisting of the following sections:

1. Critical Observations on Books, Antient and Modern. Number IX. The introductory page lists two topics ('Vol. IV. A Preface to the 4th Volume' and 'Remarks in Vindication of Justin') but they are not included in Volume 3, but Volume 4.
  - An Introductory Discourse concerning the Abuse of the Talent of Disputation in Religion by all classes of men, particularly by those from whom it ought to be now least expected, who style themselves rational Christians, and Free Enquirers after Truth. (p. 1)
  - A Discourse on the Abuse of the Talent of Disputation in Religion by all classes of men, particularly as practiced by Dr. Priestley, Mr. Gibbon, and others of the modern Sect of Philosophic Christians. (1784, pp. 1–36)
  - Critical Observations on Books, Antient and Modern. Number XI (1800, pp. 37–162)). Researches concerning Chronology continued.
2. Critical Observations on Books, Antient and Modern. Number XII (1805, pp. 163–296).
3. Critical Observations on Books, Antient and Modern. Number XIII (1807, pp. 297–430).
4. An Appendix to Vol III...
  - The use of the Calippic period proposed as a popular method to discover the day of the visible new Moons in all ages, past present and future... (pp. 1–94).
  - Illustrations of the Appendix to Volume Three. (pp. 95–269).

==== Volume 4 ====
Published from 1776 to 1800 consisting of the following sections:

1. The Preface. (pp.i-xv).
2. Remarks, in vindication of Epiphanius, Eusebius, Hegesippus, Origen, Jerom, and other antient (sic) Christian Fathers...(pp. 1–88).
3. (1795) Critical Observations on Books Antient and Modern. Number X. To be continued occasionally. Containing additional Evidence from Philo and other Jewish Authorities that Logos was a well known Name for the Messiah... (pp. 89–198).
4. An Appendix to the Fourth Volume of Critical Observations on Books, Antient and Modern. Containing a Defence...(pp. 1–128).
5. Illustrations of Various Subjects in the Preceding Four Volumes. (pp. 129–152).

=== Dispute with Joseph Priestley ===
The theologian and scholar Joseph Priestley was one of the founders of the first avowedly Unitarian congregation in England. Its followers claimed that Unitarianism was the faith of the primitive Christian church before later "corruptions" set in (e.g. Trinity). Unitarianism was so controversial at the time that Priestley began writing a pamphlet annually in defence of the Unitarian doctrine. One of his main opponents was Thomas Howes.

Howes was prompted to join in the Unitarian controversy by the publication of Priestley’s History of the Corruptions of Christianity in 1782.

== Death ==
He died at Norwich, unmarried, on 29 Sept. 1814.
