= David Carr (phenomenologist) =

American phenomenology scholar

David Carr Professor Emeritus
- Born: David Tredway Carr; 1940 (age 85–86); Parkersburg, West Virginia, US

Academic background
- Education: Yale University (BA, MA, PhD)
- Thesis: The Awareness of Persons and Moral Action (1966)
- Doctoral advisor: George Schrader

Academic work
- Era: 20th-century philosophy
- Region: Western philosophy
- School or tradition: phenomenology
- Institutions: Emory University
- Main interests: 19th- and 20th-century European philosophy, Husserl, philosophy of history

David Tredway Carr (born 1940, in Parkersburg, West Virginia) is an American phenomenology scholar and a Charles Howard Candler Professor Emeritus of Philosophy from Emory University.

== Biography ==
Carr received his B.A., M.A. and Ph.D. degrees at Yale University, completing his doctorate there in 1966. At Yale he studied under the tutelage of Wilfrid Sellars and Richard J. Bernstein. Concomitantly, as a graduate student, he studied at Heidelberg University under Karl Löwith, Dieter Henrich and Hans-Georg Gadamer, and at University of Paris under Paul Ricœur.

== Career ==
Carr's research, publication and teaching have been devoted to various aspects of Edmund Husserl's philosophy and to phenomenology in general. He is particularly attentive to the philosophy of history. The latter inquiry has led him to explore the nature of narrative, and has thus intersected with literary theory, Hegel's Phenomenology of Spirit, and analytic theories of history. Carr's work is explicitly opposed to that of Louis Mink, Hayden White, and Roland Barthes; Carr considered the basis of narrative structure to inhere in the human phenomenology of experience, even if not in what he described as "merely physical" events. Moreover, his research interests fall on the nature of transcendental philosophy, both in Husserl and in Kant. He is a former Executive Secretary and board member of the Society for Phenomenology and Existential Philosophy, and serves on the editorial boards of the philosophical series published by Indiana University Press and Northwestern University Press, and by Springer Verlag. In retirement Carr has lectured on Husserl and Maurice Merleau-Ponty at The New School for Social Research, and on Husserl's notion of “so etwas wie Leiblichkeit”—something like corporality—at Freie Universität Berlin. He was the doctoral advisor of Margret Grebowicz.

== Publications ==
Among Carr's publications are six books:

- Phenomenology and the Problem of History (1974),
- Interpreting Husserl (1987),
- Time, Narrative and History (1991),
- The Paradox of Subjectivity (1999),
- Experience and History: Phenomenological Perspectives on the Historical World (2014),
- Historical Experience: Essays on the Phenomenology of History (2021),

Carr has a number of edited or co-edited collections, and the English translation of the major work of the late Husserl, The Crisis of European Sciences and Transcendental Phenomenology. He is the author of numerous essays, a collection of which is translated into Japanese, and a longstanding contributor to History and Theory.

== Awards ==
David Carr's research has been supported by the Alexander von Humboldt Foundation and the Social Sciences and Humanities Research Council of Canada.
