= Richard Norman (philosopher) =

British academic, philosopher and humanist

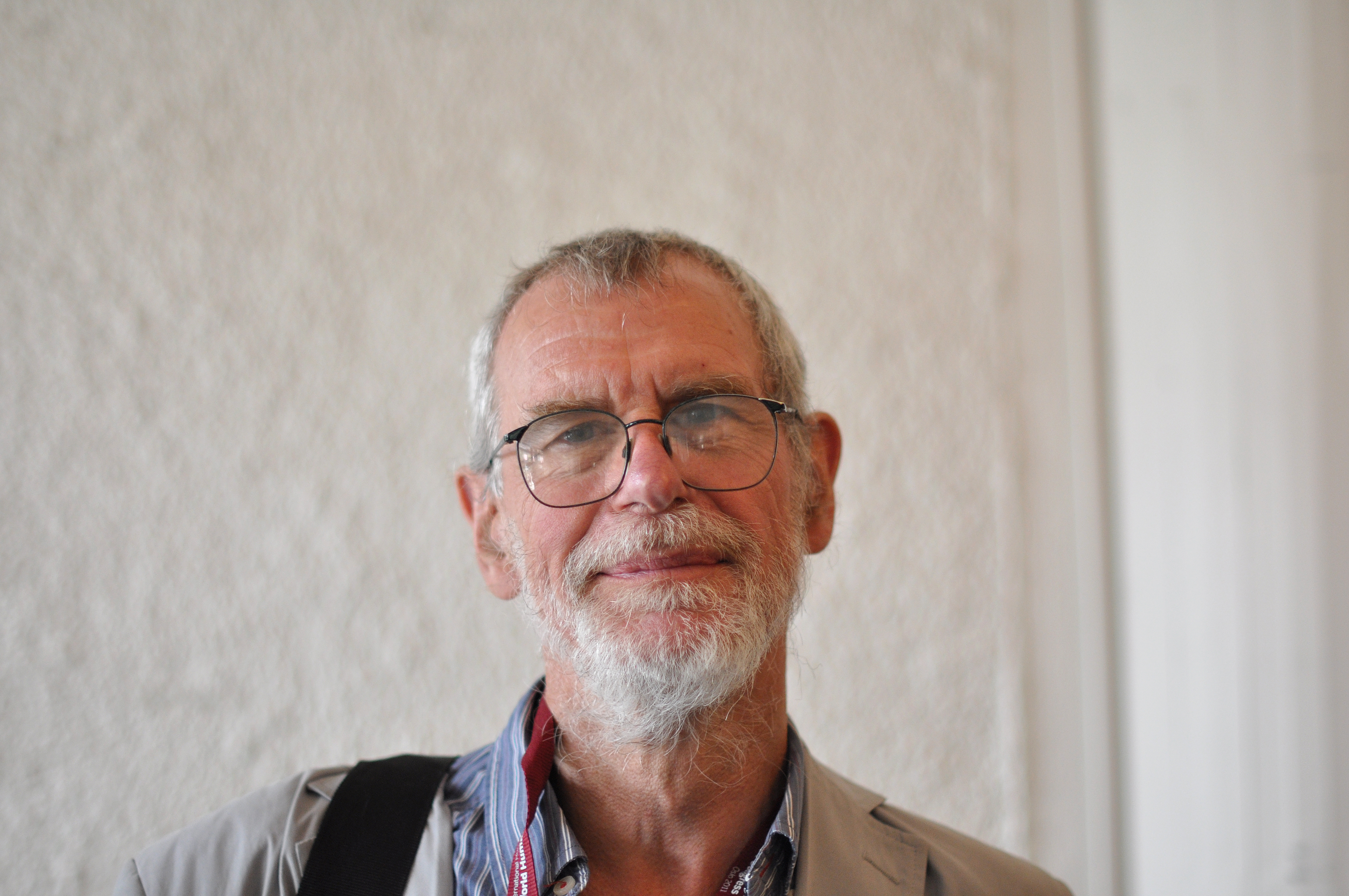
Professor Richard J. Norman

Richard J. Norman is a British academic, philosopher and humanist. He is currently Emeritus Professor of Moral Philosophy at the University of Kent, and a patron of Humanists UK.

== Life ==
Norman formerly taught philosophy at the University of Kent, where his areas of interest were mainly moral and political philosophy, including both theoretical and practical ethics.

== Works ==
His published works include:

- Hegel's "Phenomenology" : a philosophical introduction. Brighton: Sussex University Press. 1976. ISBN 978-0-85621-055-6.
- The Moral Philosophers (1983)
- Free and Equal (1987)
- Ethics, Killing and War (1995)
- On Humanism (2004, 2012)
- Religion and Atheism (2017, Editor)
