= List of Humanistic synagogues =

This is a list of Humanistic synagogues and chavurot around the world. Most Humanistic synagogues are affiliated with the Society for Humanistic Judaism (SHJ), however, some synagogues agree with the principles of Humanistic Judaism without being members of the SHJ.

== Canada ==
- Oraynu Congregation, Toronto

== United States ==
=== Arizona ===
- Or Adam Congregation for Humanistic Judaism, Scottsdale
- Secular Humanist Jewish Circle, Tucson

=== California ===
- Adat Chaverim, Congregation for Humanistic Judaism, Encino
- Kol Hadash, Northern California Congregation for Humanistic Judaism, Berkeley
- Pacific Community of Cultural Jews, Irvine

=== Colorado ===
- Beth Ami, Colorado Congregation for Humanistic Judaism, Boulder

=== Connecticut ===
- Congregation for Humanistic Judaism, Fairfield County, Westport

=== Florida ===
- Congregation Beth Adam, Boca Raton
- Humanistic Havurah of Sarasota, Sarasota

=== Illinois ===
- Beth Chaverim Humanistic Jewish Community, Deerfield
- Kol Hadash Humanistic Congregation, Deerfield

=== Maryland ===
- Baltimore Jewish Cultural Chavurah, Baltimore

=== Massachusetts ===
- Kahal B’raira, Congregation for Humanistic Judaism, Cambridge

=== Michigan ===
- Congregation for Humanistic Judaism of Metro Detroit, Farmington Hills

=== Minnesota ===
- Or Emet, Minnesota Congregation for Humanistic Judaism, St. Louis Park

=== Missouri ===
- Gateway Community of Humanistic Judaism, St. Louis

=== New Jersey ===
- Kahal Chaverim: NJ Congregation for Humanistic Judaism, Mount Freedom

=== New York ===
- Beth Haskalah, Rochester Society for Humanistic Judaism, Rochester
- The City Congregation for Humanistic Judaism, New York City
- Westchester Community for Humanistic Judaism, Scarsdale

=== North Carolina ===
- Kol Haskalah, A Humanistic Jewish Congregation, Chapel Hill
- Jewish Secular Community of Asheville, Weaverville

=== Ohio ===
- Congregation Beth Adam, Loveland

=== Oregon ===
- Kol Shalom, Community for Humanistic Judaism, Portland

=== Washington ===
- Secular Jewish Circle of Puget Sound, Seattle

=== Washington, D.C. ===
- Machar, The Secular Humanistic Jewish Congregation of Greater Washington

== See also ==
- List of Conservative synagogues
- List of Orthodox synagogues
- List of Reconstructionist synagogues
- List of Reform synagogues
- List of synagogues
