= Humanism and Its Aspirations =

2003 publication by the American Humanist Association

Humanism and Its Aspirations (subtitled Humanist Manifesto III, a successor to the Humanist Manifesto of 1933) is the most recent of the Humanist Manifestos, published in 2003 by the American Humanist Association (AHA). The newest one is much shorter, listing six primary beliefs, which echo themes from its predecessors:

- Knowledge of the world is derived by observation, experimentation, trial and error, and rational analysis.
- The human species is an integral part of nature, the result of unguided evolutionary change.
- Ethical values are derived from human need and interest as tested by experience;
- Life's fulfillment emerges from individual participation in the service of humane ideals;
- Humans are social animals by nature and find meaning in relationships;
- Working to benefit human societies maximizes individual happiness and collective well-being.

It has been used as source material for secular and atheistic ethics.

== Signatories ==
Academics and other prominent persons were signatories to the document, attesting "We who sign Humanism and Its Aspirations declare ourselves in general agreement with its substance":

=== Notable signatories ===
- Philip Appleman (poet and distinguished professor emeritus of English literature at Indiana University in Bloomington, Indiana)
- Khoren Arisian (senior leader at New York Society for Ethical Culture)
- Bill Baird (reproductive rights pioneer)
- Frank Berger (pharmacologist, developer of anti-anxiety drugs)
- Howard Box (minister emeritus at the Unitarian Universalist Christian Church in Oak Ridge, Tennessee)
- Lester R. Brown (founder and president of the Earth Policy Institute)
- August E. Brunsman IV (executive director of the Secular Student Alliance)
- Rob Buitenweg (vice president of the International Humanist and Ethical Union)
- Vern Bullough (sexologist and former co-president of the International Humanist and Ethical Union)
- David Bumbaugh (professor at Meadville Lombard Theological School in Chicago, Illinois)
- Matthew Cherry (executive director of the Institute for Humanist Studies)
- Joseph Chuman (visiting professor of Religious studies at Columbia University and leader of the Ethical Culture Society of Bergen County, New Jersey)
- Curt Collier (leader of the Riverdale-Yonkers Society for Ethical Culture, New York)
- Fred Cook (retired executive committee member, International Humanist and Ethical Union)
- Carl Coon (former U.S. Ambassador to Nepal)
- Richard Dawkins (evolutionary biologist, zoologist, science communicator, and Professor for Public Understanding of Science at the University of Oxford)
- Charles Debrovner (president of the Humanist Institute)
- Arthur Dobrin (professor of humanities at Hofstra University and leader emeritus of the Ethical Humanist Society of Long Island, New York)
- Margaret Downey (president of the Freethought Society of Greater Philadelphia)
- Sonja Eggerickx (vice president of Unie Vrijzinnige Verenigingen in Belgium and vice president of the International Humanist and Ethical Union)
- Riane Eisler (president of the Center for Partnership Studies)
- Albert Ellis (psychologist, creator of rational emotive behavior therapy and founder of the Albert Ellis Institute)
- Edward L. Ericson (leader emeritus of Ethical Culture)
- Roy P. Fairfield (co-founder of Union Graduate School in Cincinnati, Ohio)
- Antony Flew (philosopher)
- Levi Fragell (president of the International Humanist and Ethical Union)
- Jerome Isaac Friedman (Nobel Laureate in Physics and professor emeritus at the Massachusetts Institute of Technology in Cambridge, Massachusetts)
- Arun Gandhi (peace activist, co-founder of the M. K. Gandhi Institute for Nonviolence in Memphis, Tennessee)
- Kendyl Gibbons (president of the Unitarian Universalist Ministers Association)
- Sol Gordon (sexologist)
- Ethelbert Haskins (retired treasurer of the Humanist Foundation)
- Jim Herrick (editor of the New Humanist)
- Pervez Hoodbhoy (professor of physics at Quaid-e-Azam University in Islamabad, Pakistan)
- Fran P. Hosken (editor of Women's International Network News)
- Joan Johnson Lewis (president of National Leaders Council of the American Ethical Union)
- Stefan Jonasson (immediate past president of HUUmanists)
- Larry Jones (president of the Institute for Humanist Studies)
- Edwin Kagin (founder and director of Camp Quest)
- Beth Lamont (American Humanist Association representative to the United Nations)
- Gerald A. Larue (professor emeritus of biblical archaeology and history of the Bible at the University of Southern California in Los Angeles, California)
- Joseph Levee (board member, Council for Secular Humanism)
- Ellen McBride (immediate past president, American Ethical Union)
- Lester Mondale (retired Unitarian Universalist minister and signer of Humanist Manifestos I and II)
- Henry Morgentaler (abortion rights pioneer)
- Stephen D. Mumford (president of the Center for Research on Population and Security)
- William Murry (president and dean at Meadville Lombard Theological School in Chicago, Illinois)
- Sarah Oelberg (president of HUUmanists)
- Indumati Parikh (president of the Center for the Study of Social Change in India)
- Philip Paulson (activist for the separation of church and state)
- Katha Pollitt (columnist at The Nation)
- Howard Radest (dean emeritus of the Humanist Institute)
- James "Amazing" Randi (magician, founder of the James Randi Educational Foundation)
- Larry Reyka (president of the Humanist Society)
- David Schafer (retired research physiologist, U.S. Veterans Administration)
- Eugenie Scott (executive director of the National Center for Science Education)
- Michael Shermer (editor of Skeptic magazine)
- James R. Simpson (professor of international agricultural economics at Ryukoku University in Kyoto, Japan)
- Warren Allen Smith (editor and author)
- Matthew les Spetter (associate professor in social psychology at the Peace Studies Institute of Manhattan University, New York City)
- Oliver Stone (Academy Award-winning filmmaker)
- John Swomley (professor emeritus of social ethics at St. Paul School of Theology in Leawood, Kansas)
- Robert Tapp (dean of the Humanist Institute)
- Carl Thitchener (co-minister at the Unitarian Universalist Church of Amherst and Canandaigua, New York)
- Maureen Thitchener (co-minister at the Unitarian Universalist Church of Amherst and Canandaigua, New York)
- Rodrigue Tremblay (professor emeritus of economics and international finance at the Université de Montréal in Quebec, Canada)
- Kurt Vonnegut (philosopher, anti-war activist, and satirical novelist)
- John Weston (ministerial settlement director, Unitarian Universalist Association)
- Edward O. Wilson (ethologist, zoologist, science communicator, professor of evolutionary biology at Harvard University and two-time Pulitzer Prize winner)
- Sherwin Wine (rabbi of the Birmingham Temple, founder and president of the Society for Humanistic Judaism)

=== Nobel laureates ===
22 Nobel laureates were among the signatories:

- Philip W. Anderson (Physics, 1977)
- Paul D. Boyer (Chemistry, 1997)
- Owen Chamberlain (Physics, 1959)
- Francis Crick (Medicine, 1962)
- Paul J. Crutzen (Chemistry, 1995)
- Pierre-Gilles de Gennes (Physics, 1991)
- Johann Deisenhofer (Chemistry, 1988)
- Jerome I. Friedman (Physics, 1990)
- Sheldon Glashow (Physics, 1979)
- David J. Gross (Physics, 2004)
- Herbert A. Hauptman (Chemistry, 1985)
- Dudley Herschbach (Chemistry, 1986)
- Harold W. Kroto (Chemistry, 1996)
- Yuan T. Lee (Chemistry, 1986)
- Mario J. Molina (Chemistry, 1995)
- Erwin Neher (Medicine, 1991)
- Ilya Prigogine (Chemistry, 1977)
- Richard J. Roberts (Medicine, 1993)
- John E. Sulston (Medicine, 2002)
- Henry Taube (Chemistry, 1983)
- E. Donnall Thomas (Medicine, 1990)
- James Dewey Watson (Medicine, 1962)

=== Past AHA presidents ===
- Edd Doerr
- Michael W. Werner
- Suzanne I. Paul
- Lyle L. Simpson
- Bette Chambers
- Lloyd L. Morain
- Robert W. McCoy
- Vashti McCollum

=== AHA board members ===
- Melvin Lipman (president)
- Lois Lyons (vice president)
- Ronald W. Fegley (secretary)
- John Nugent (treasurer)
- Wanda Alexander
- John R. Cole
- Tom Ferrick
- Robert D. Finch
- John M. Higgins
- Herb Silverman
- Maddy Urken
- Mike Werner

=== Drafting committee ===
- Fred Edwords (chairman)
- Edd Doerr (also included above as a past AHA president)
- Tony Hileman
- Pat Duffy Hutcheon
- Maddy Urken

== See also ==
- Amsterdam Declaration 2002, a similar document from the International Humanist and Ethical Union
- Criticism of religion
  - Anti-clericalism
  - Separation of church and state
- Ethical veganism
- Evolution in public education
- Irreligion by country
- Jewish secularism
- Marxist humanism
- Secular Buddhism
- Secular morality
- Social philosophy
- The Necessity of Atheism, a 1811 essay written by the English poet Percy Bysshe Shelley
- The Necessity of Secularism, a 2014 essay written by the Center for Inquiry president Ronald A. Lindsay
- Universal Declaration of Human Rights, a similar document adopted in 1948 by the U.N. General Assembly
- Vegetarianism and religion
