= Machar (Washington, D.C.) =

Humanistic Jewish congregation in Washington, D.C., United States

- Hebrew: מחר
- Location in Maryland, just outside the Washington, D.C. boundary

Religion
- Affiliation: Judaism
- Rite: Humanistic Judaism
- Ecclesiastical or organizational status: Jewish congregation
- Leadership: Rabbi Jeremy Kridel
- Status: Active

Location
- Location: Washington, D.C. metro area: 100 Welsh Park Drive, Rockville, Maryland 20850 (39°05′07″N 77°08′50″W); 1 Veterans Place, Silver Spring, Maryland 20910 (38°59′51″N 77°01′28″W)
- Country: United States
- Interactive map of Machar
- Administration: Society for Humanistic Judaism
- Coordinates: 39°05′07″N 77°08′50″W

Architecture
- Established: 1977 (as a congregation)

Website
- machar.org

Machar
- Machar, The Washington Congregation For Secular Humanistic Judaism
- The Machar logo
- Tax ID no.: 31-1600373
- Legal status: 501(c)(3)

Machar (Hebrew: מחר, lit. 'Tomorrow'), officially Machar, The Washington Congregation For Secular Humanistic Judaism, is a Humanistic Jewish congregation located in the metro area of Washington, D.C., in the United States. Affiliated with the Society for Humanistic Judaism, the non-theistic congregation was founded in 1977, and celebrates Jewish culture, education and celebrations. The congregation has a Jewish cultural school, social action committee, and regular newsletter, and welcomes interfaith couples.

Depending on the type of service, the congregation worships at either one of two locations in Maryland:

- 100 Welsh Park Drive, in Rockville; or
- 1 Veterans Place, Silver Spring.

== Belief and structure ==
Machar is an inclusive community of people of all backgrounds, ages, and gender orientation, including intercultural and interfaith couples. The Association of Humanistic Rabbis supports an individual's right to marry someone based on love and the quality of their relationship, and the rights of rabbis to officiate and co-officiate at wedding ceremonies of people from different backgrounds.

Machar is a member of Jewish Outreach Institute's Big Tent Judaism Coalition. Machar supports the 2005 statement on Conversion (Adoption) of the Association of Humanistic Rabbis that says in part, “We, the members of the Association of Humanistic Rabbis, welcome all individuals into the Jewish people who desire to link their lives with the experience of the Jewish nation/family to identify with its historic memories and to participate in its culture and future.”

The congregation has several committees and groups, including: ranging from Social Action to Community Service to Jewish Religious Text Study.

=== Religious observance ===
The congregation observes Jewish holidays including Rosh Hashanah, Yom Kippur, Sukkot, Simhat Torah, Hanukkah, Tu B'Shevat, Purim, and Passover. In addition, Machar has programming around Yom HaShoah and Darwin Day, and periodic Shabbat services. Services use language that is consistent with the nontheistic philosophy of Humanistic Judaism.

== History ==
Jules Abrams and Mary Perica, two members of Rabbi Sherwin Wine's Birmingham Temple, sought to create a similar congregation in the Washington metropolitan area when they moved from Detroit. In December 1977, Rabbi Wine gave a presentation to a group of area residents about Humanistic Judaism. The congregation grew out of this first public meeting. Machar was incorporated on December 22, 1986; and celebrated its 35th anniversary in September 2012.

== Education ==
=== Jewish cultural school ===
Machar's Sunday school integrates Jewish history, culture, values, and practice into a developmentally appropriate curriculum at each grade level, from preschool-aged children through the B’Nei Mitzvah year. Post-mitzvah teens can assist in Jewish Cultural School classrooms and help to organize community service activities on behalf of the congregation.

=== Adult education ===
Machar offers programming for adults concurrently with Sunday school. Topics include themes of Judaism, Humanism, and other social, humanitarian, or personal issues.

== See also ==
- Society for Humanistic Judaism
- Secular Jewish culture
- International Institute for Secular Humanistic Judaism
- Or Emet (Minneapolis–Saint Paul, Minnesota)
- City Congregation for Humanistic Judaism (Manhattan, New York)
- Kahal B'raira (Greater Boston, Massachusetts)
