= Greg Epstein =

American Humanist chaplain (born 1977)

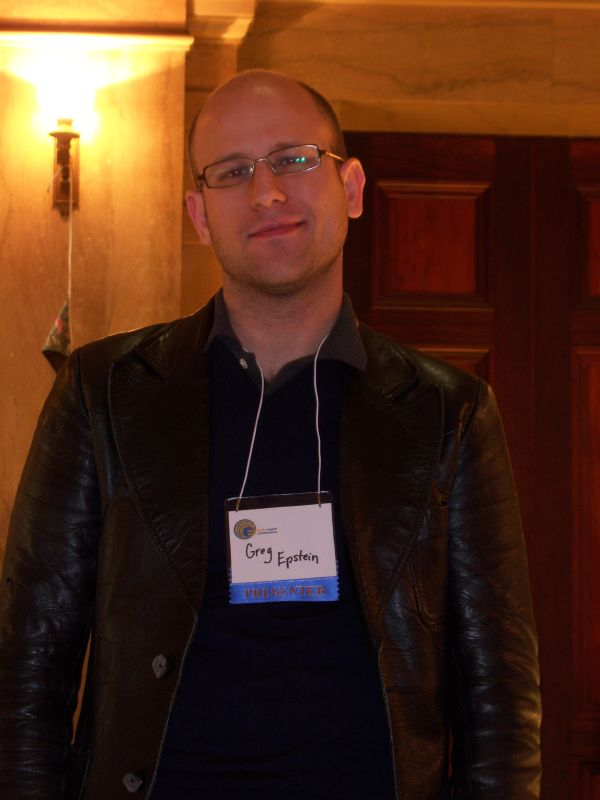
Epstein in 2007

Greg M. Epstein (born 1977) is an American Humanist chaplain at Harvard University and the Massachusetts Institute of Technology who is the president of the Harvard Chaplains Organization. He is an ordained Humanist rabbi, and has been influential in American humanism as a blogger, spokesperson, adviser and author of the New York Times bestseller Good Without God: What a Billion Nonreligious People Do Believe. Epstein was an expert on the first three seasons of the reality show "Married at First Sight."

== Early life and education ==
Epstein grew up in Flushing, Queens, New York, as a Reform Jew. He studied Buddhism and Taoism while at Stuyvesant High School in New York City, and, in college, went to Taiwan for a semester to study Chan Buddhism, from which the Zen tradition originated. Disillusioned by his experience with Eastern religions, Epstein returned to the U.S. and shifted his focus to rock music, recording and singing professionally for a year after college. Soon after, he discovered Humanism and considered training as a Humanist rabbi and chaplain.

After five years of study in Jerusalem and Michigan, the state in which the Birmingham Temple—the first congregation of the Humanistic Jewish movement—is located, Epstein received ordination (semikhah in Jewish tradition) as a Humanist rabbi from the International Institute for Secular Humanistic Judaism in 2005. Epstein holds a B.A. in religion and Chinese and an M.A. in Judaic studies from the University of Michigan, and an M.T.S. from Harvard Divinity School.

== Career ==
=== Humanism at Harvard ===
Epstein began serving as Humanist Chaplain at Harvard in Fall 2005, when the Humanist Chaplaincy at Harvard's total annual budget was $28,000. In the years since then, he has raised nearly $3 million in gifts and pledges to the organization, while organizing and launching a range of new programs and initiatives, including opening the Humanist Hub, a 3,200-square-foot (300 m^{2}) "Center for Humanist Life" in Harvard Square, where members are encouraged to "connect with other people, act to make the world better, and evolve as human beings."

While at Harvard, Epstein has blogged for CNN, Newsweek and The Washington Post; and his work as a Humanist rabbi and chaplain has been featured by ABC News Network, Al Jazeera and others. He is an adviser to two student groups at Harvard College, the Secular Society and the Interfaith Council, and to the Harvard Humanist Graduate Community. From 2007 to 2010, he chaired the Advisory Board of the national umbrella organization the Secular Student Alliance, joining such renowned nonbelievers as Richard Dawkins and Christopher Hitchens. In 2011 he lectured at the inaugural event of the group Agnostics, Atheists, Humanists, & Secularists in Santa Monica, California.

In an interview, Epstein says that being a Humanist rabbi "means I combine Jewish culture with the belief that this world is all we have". He is not anti-religious and "he is happy to work with the religious left (as he calls it) to help beat off the fundamentalist religious right." The Guardian compares his influence in American humanism to Richard Dawkins influence in the UK.

In August 2021 Epstein was elected by the members of the Harvard Chaplains Organization as the organization's president, a position that runs normally for two one-year terms.

=== Humanist Community Project ===
Epstein led the Boston-based Humanist Community Project, later renamed to Humanist Hub, together with assistant humanist chaplain Vanessa Zoltan. The project has several hundred student members and its mission included developing "opportunities for connection, ethical development, and the celebration of life based on human reason, compassion, and creativity, not religious dogma."

=== Ethics of technology at MIT ===
In 2018 Epstein began serving as humanist chaplain at MIT concurrently with his Harvard post. His role at MIT focuses in large part on the ethics of technology. His duties include encouraging non-religious students to give deep consideration to the societal impact of the entrepreneurial ventures they may go on to launch.

== Personal life ==
In early 2021 Epstein shared his struggles with compulsive smartphone use and addiction to networked technologies.
