= Humanistic Judaism UK =

UK organisation representing Humanistic Judaism

- Abbreviation: HJUK
- Formation: October 2011
- Type: Religious organisation
- Purpose: Promoting Humanistic Judaism in the United Kingdom
- Headquarters: London, United Kingdom
- Region served: United Kingdom and Europe
- Leader: Martin Di Maggio
- Affiliations: Society for Humanistic Judaism; Humanists UK; Spinoza Havurah
- Website: hjuk.org

Humanistic Judaism UK (commonly abbreviated as HJUK) serves the Humanistic Jewish community in the United Kingdom. The organisation is currently chaired by Dr Joshua Silberstein Bamford and its spiritual leader is Martin Di Maggio.

== Background ==
Humanistic Judaism is a non-theistic approach to Judaism — a way to celebrate Jewish identity and spirituality without recourse to divine authority, holding that human beings have the intelligence and wisdom to determine the course of their own lives. The movement has been described as "God-optional Judaism", with Di Maggio explaining: "It doesn't matter if someone believes in God or not, as the focus is on the humanistic elements of Judaism as a Jewish culture or as Jewish spirituality."

The movement celebrates Jewish identity through reason, ethics, and community rather than supernaturalism, and is particularly welcoming to those from mixed and interfaith backgrounds, members of the LGBT community, and individuals who have faced barriers to inclusion in mainstream Jewish institutional life.

== History ==
HJUK held its inaugural meeting in October 2011, at which it was agreed the organisation needed to offer contact points across the UK so that small local groups could develop under its umbrella. Previous attempts had been made to establish a branch of Humanistic Judaism in Britain, but these had not put down permanent roots.

The organisation grew gradually, and by 2025 its core UK community comprised over 480 members, with in-person services held on Jewish holidays in London. Its affiliated online community, Spinoza Havurah, has around 500 members from around the world.

On 3 September 2025, HJUK conducted its first-ever B'Mitzvah ceremony — a milestone for the organisation — officiated by its current leader Martin Di Maggio. Di Maggio described it as "a huge step" for the community and expressed hope it would raise wider awareness of the movement in the UK.

== Limmud ==
HJUK has a regular presence at the annual Limmud Festival, the cross-communal Jewish educational and cultural gathering held each December at a UK conference centre. At the Limmud Festival 2024, Di Maggio led a Kabbalat Shabbat service, which was the only service from an official non-orthodox denomination, and was conducted without theistic language. He also presented a dedicated session on his nontheistic siddur and the beliefs underpinning Humanistic Judaism. Di Maggio was also confirmed to present and run Humanistic Jewish prayer services at the Limmud Festival 2025.

== Affiliations ==
Whilst independent, HJUK is ideologically aligned with the following organisations:

- Society for Humanistic Judaism (SHJ) — the primary international body for Humanistic Judaism, based in the United States.
- Humanists UK — reflecting HJUK's view that its humanism is inseparable from its Judaism.
- Spinoza Havurah — an international online Humanistic Jewish community founded in 2021.

== Activities ==
=== Shabbat and Jewish Holidays ===
HJUK celebrates Shabbat and Jewish holidays through services and community gatherings focusing on their cultural, ethical, and historical significance. Holidays such as Rosh Hashanah and Yom Kippur are treated as occasions for personal growth and reflection, marked with music, storytelling, and readings from historical and contemporary sources. Members recite prayers with rewordings that replace theistic language. One example is a humanistic rendering of the Shema: Shemá Yisraél Kulánu Eḥád Veyiudénu Eḥád — "Hear O Yisraél: We are all One, and our Purpose is One."

=== Educational Programmes ===
HJUK offers educational programmes for adults and children on Jewish history, culture, and ethics, with emphasis on values including tikkun olam (repairing the world) and gemilut chassadim (acts of loving-kindness), and encouraging social activism and interfaith dialogue.

=== Life-cycle Ceremonies ===
HJUK offers humanistic ceremonies for important life passages including weddings, baby namings, and B'Mitzvah milestones, drawing upon Jewish tradition while focusing on the human significance of each event.

=== Radical Inclusion ===
A central principle of HJUK is radical inclusion. The organisation is particularly welcoming to those from mixed and interfaith backgrounds, members of the LGBT community, and individuals who have faced barriers to inclusion in mainstream Jewish institutional life.

== See also ==
- Humanistic Judaism
- Society for Humanistic Judaism
- Humanists UK
- Secular Judaism
- Limmud
- Jewish Renewal
