= Felice Pazner Malkin =

Israeli artist (1929–2022)

Felice Pazner Malkin (Hebrew: פליס פזנר מלכין; 1928/1929 – July 2022) was an American-born Israeli artist. She was on the faculty of the Society for Humanistic Judaism.

== Biography ==
Felice Pazner was born in Philadelphia, United States. She immigrated to Israel in 1949. Her first studio was in Jerusalem's Beit Hakerem neighborhood, where she painted and illustrated books. In 1950, she married Yaakov Malkin. They spent a year in Paris where Felice studied at the Sorbonne and painted at a studio in Bellevue. Her son, Irad, was born in 1951 in the United States.

== Art career ==
In 1953, Pazner Malkin had her first one-woman show in Tel Aviv. She subsequently exhibited at the Tel Aviv Museum, and produced Israel's first artist-designed theater posters for the Habima, Cameri, and Matateh theater companies.

From 1956 to 1957, she returned to Paris to study theatrical art and design with Jean-Marie Serreau, and to continue her studio work. The following year, the family moved to Haifa where they stayed until 1971, and where her daughter, Sivan, was born. (Rabbi Sivan Malkin Maas is an Israel Prize winner for history.)

Pazner Malkin held several additional one-woman shows during these years as well as contributions to group shows. Her album of drawings inspired by the Song of Songs was published in the book Jonah Jones and the Song of Songs (Haifa, 1966).

Pazner Malkin was a founding member of Beit HaGefen, an Arab–Jewish cultural center in Haifa. She also founded and directed the Beit Rothschild Art School. In 1971 she moved to Jerusalem, where she founded the Jewish-Arab Arts Center for Hebrew University's Buber Institute and remained its director until 1975.

Her work has is part of the James Michener Collection, in Austin, Texas. A series of drawings by Pazner Malkin on the theme of 'Art as Love' was published in three albums by Massada Press, and accompanied Yaakov Malkin's text in the book Art as Love (Massada, 1975). She and her husband, Yaakov, co-edited the Massada Lexicon of the Arts (1975). Some of her 'Jerusalem People' paintings were exhibited at the American Cultural Center in Jerusalem, and the series appeared in a book published by Bialik Institute. Her 'Paris Vistas' drawings illustrated Yaakov Malkin's novel Vankaban in 1993.

In 1996, she designed the documentary exhibition "Jewish Figurative Art: The First 3000 Years" at the International Institute for Secular Humanistic Judaism in Detroit, Michigan.

Felice Pazner Malkin died in July 2022 at age 93.

== Published works ==
- "Jewish Art in the Ancient World"

== See also ==
- Israeli art
