= Yaakov Malkin =

- יעקב מלכין
- Born: 3 August 1926; Warsaw, Poland
- Died: 21 July 2019 (aged 92); Jerusalem
- Occupations: Educator; literary critic; professor emeritus
- Years active: 1944–2019
- Spouse: Felice Pazner (m. 1950)
- Children: 2, including Sivan

Yaakov Malkin (Hebrew: יעקב מלכין; 3 August 1926 – 21 July 2019) was an Israeli educator, literary critic, and professor emeritus in the Faculty of Arts at Tel Aviv University. He was active in several institutions that deal with both cultural and Humanistic Judaism.

== Early life ==
Malkin was born into a secular Jewish family in Warsaw on 3 August 1926. His father, Dov Ber Malkin, was a professor and theatre critic. He attended the General Jewish Labour Bund school and moved to Mandatory Palestine with his family at the age of seven, where he continued his schooling in the school system of the Histadrut labor federation.

== Career ==
Starting in 1944, while still a student, Malkin published literary, cinema, and theater critiques, and served as the editor of On the Wall, the magazine of the Hashomer Hatzair youth movement (1944–1946). During the 1948 Arab-Israeli War, he served as a broadcasting officer for the Haganah and the IDF (1947–1948) in the underground radio station, Telem Shamir Boaz, that later became the Israel Army Radio (Galei Tzahal). Malkin lectured (in Yiddish) and was active in the Cyprus internment camps before the inmates were sent to Israel, and worked for the IDF arms procurement branch in France 1949. He directed and lectured in Pomansky College for Judaism as Culture in New York in 1951, and founded and directed a Hebrew Ulpan (language school) in the Quartier Latin in Paris in 1956. While in Paris, he also worked as assistant to the cultural attaché at the Israeli embassy in Paris. He also participated in a lecture tour on Judaism in world literature in Australia (1960), the United States (1965), and France (1970).

From 1952 to 1956, Malkin taught comparative literature studies and the Bible as literature at the Seminar HaKibbutzim teachers' college in Tel Aviv. At the same time he served as director of the repertoire department at the Habima national theater and as a drama instructor at the theater schools of Habima and of the Cameri Theater.

From 1971 to 1981, he founded and directed the Mateh Yehuda community college, which employed the educational methods of Empire State College (SUNY) where students create personal tracks of study. This was adopted to conditions in Israel and to the particular requirements of working students in the Mateh Yehuda area.

From 1969 to 1994, Malkin taught aesthetics, theater and film criticism at the Tel Aviv University. In 1971 he established, together with the Dean of the Faculty for New Arts, Professor Moshe Lazar, the Department for Cinema and Television at the Tel Aviv University. He also served as the university's representative in the founding team of the Tel Aviv Cinematheque, and as editor of the "Cinematheque Pages" – film criticism essays handed out to viewers before the screening of each movie, together with Uri Klein.

From 1958 to 1971, Malkin founded and directed the first community centers in Haifa, Beit Rothschild and the Beit Hagefen Jewish–Arab Center. These municipal centers were at first run by groups of friends who led the centers' dozens of social activities, including the Haifa Cinematheque, built inside Beit Rothschild. During these years Malkin also lectured in the Technion (Israel Institute of Technology) on aesthetics and rhetoric.

Malkin later served as editor-in-chief for Free Judaism, a magazine for Judaism as a culture, which he founded in 1995 and which came out in print editions until 2004. Malkin also served as provost at the International Institute for Secular Humanistic Judaism, based in Jerusalem and Farmington Hills, Michigan (Birmingham Temple). The Institute trains students who hold an undergraduate degree to be community leaders for secular communities and those with a master's degree or a PhD to be secular rabbis in a four-year track of studies and work.

== Writings ==
Malkin's writings focus on humanistic ethics and the preservation of Jewish culture in a social context where literalist interpretations on the existence of God fade with each generation. Malkin, and many others, argue that to be a Jew is fundamentally a cultural identity, and not a religious one, and he often jokes that he was a descendant of many generations of devout Jews, and then goes on to list several generations of ancestors who were atheists. He further argues that whereas religiosity has been an essential part of Jewish identity, the actual belief in a god was always a matter of friction, and whether individual Jews publicly admitted it or not, he claims most Jews have always understood god as an allegory and seen Judaism as a tradition of cultural - rather than religious - significance. Given this reality, Malkin argues that an honest reflection of one's own Jewish beliefs will demonstrate to oneself that they are already a humanistic or secular Jew.

Malkin perceives Judaism as a pluralistic culture, both in its secular and its religious forms. He claims that Judaism has been pluralistic since the biblical era when the culture of the Jewish people was characterized by belief in many gods, religions, rituals, beliefs, and opinions. Beginning in Hellenistic times Judaism developed a variety of cultures, beliefs, and opinions.

Unlike atheist scholars such as Richard Dawkins, Christopher Hitchens and Sam Harris, who see atheism as the lack of belief, Malkin dedicates his writings to the humanistic beliefs shared by the non-religious community in the West generally, and among the Jewish people in particular. Malkin claims that there are no nonbelievers, but rather people who express a variety of beliefs in their day-to-day lives. These can include religious beliefs, characterized by a commitment to follow religious leaders who claim to speak in the name of a god, or nonreligious beliefs, which include the belief in humans as creators of their own paths and behaviors, whether as individuals or in society, with the goal of attaining the purpose of human life: happiness.

In his books What do Secular Jews Believe?, Secular Judaism: Faith, Values, and Spirituality, and The Atheist Belief of Secular Jews, Malkin expresses his views of the humanistic belief in people that leads to national awareness and belief in the rights of all people and all nations. These beliefs lead to a rebuttal of "godly religions" that obligate the believer to keep the rules of their leaders, especially those that stand in contrast to the values of humanism and universal justice. These anti-humanistic beliefs lead, among other things, to the acceptance of secular ideological religions such as Communism and Nazism wherein believers are also obligated to obey leaders, regardless of the cost.

Humanistic nonreligious beliefs include agnostics such as Socrates, deists such as Epicurus, pantheists such as Spinoza and Albert Einstein, and atheists such as John Stuart Mill and Bertrand Russell, which are all free of commitment to a religious or ideological religion. A contemporary institutionalized Jewish form of humanism is Humanistic Judaism, to which Malkin's works contributed and in which movement Malkin's daughter Sivan is a rabbi. These humanistic nonreligious beliefs stand in contrast to postmodern relativism in that they see themselves as bound by humanistic ethical values and by the values of universal justice as articulated by Confucius and Hillel the Elder. These values of justice lead to the moral values of egalitarianism, political freedom, and human and national rights.

== Personal life ==
In 1950, Malkin married Israeli artist Felice Pazner. They had two children: Irad Malkin, a history professor who won the 2014 Israel Prize, and Sivan Malkin Maas, a rabbi.

== Death ==
On July 21, 2019, at the age of 92, Malkin died at his home in Jerusalem.
