= Or Emet =

Humanistic Jewish synagogue in Minnesota, US

Religion
- Affiliation: Judaism
- Rite: Humanistic
- Ecclesiastical or organizational status: Synagogue
- Status: Active

Location
- Location: Minneapolis – Saint Paul, Minnesota
- Country: United States
- Administration: Society for Humanistic Judaism

Architecture
- Established: c. 1980s

Website
- www.oremet.org

Or Emet, officially the Minnesota Congregation for Humanistic Judaism, is a Humanistic Jewish synagogue and congregation in Minneapolis – Saint Paul, Minnesota, in the United States. The congregation is a member of the Society for Humanistic Judaism. It is a community of cultural Jews, secular Jews, Jewish humanists, and other humanists, united by a commitment to humanism and by respect and support for Jewish culture, traditions, and Jewish identity, and by those traditional Jewish values most consonant with humanism — tikkun olam, social justice. Or Emet embraces a human-centered philosophy that combines rational thinking and scientific inquiry with the celebration of Jewish culture and traditions.

== Name ==
The name "Or Emet" means "Light of Truth" in Hebrew. It was chosen as the name for the congregation because it reflects the tradition of enlightened inquiry in Jewish thought that dates back to the debates of the ancient Talmudic scholars. It also reflects the flowering since the Enlightenment of secular science and logical reason as new Truth-seeking tools. These took hold in the Jewish community and began to transform it in part into a new culture of secular Jews ("Haskalah", or Jewish Enlightenment), personified by such major thinkers as Baruch Spinoza and Moses Mendelssohn. Spinoza of course was one of the architects of the modern democratic world. Consistent with this background, Or Emet is a "learning community" committed to study and inquiry—using the lights of science and reason—as well as an "action community" committed to justice, equality, and equity. The preceding is reflected in Or Emet's Cultural Sunday School, Or Emet's many adult education and speakers' programs in the course of the year, and in the fact that Or Emet's Social Justice Committee is its most active committee. All of Or Emet's activities are informed by Jewish culture, traditions, and values.

== History ==
The congregation was founded in the early 1980s in Minneapolis by Dr. Harold Londer and Dr. Larry Garfin. Dr. Londer, Minneapolis oncologist, had heard a lecture on Humanistic Judaism at the First Unitarian Society in Minneapolis by Humanistic Judaism founder Rabbi Sherwin Wine. Londer saw Humanistic Judaism as the movement that could provide Jewish community for secular Jews and chose to establish a Humanistic Judaism congregation in Minnesota. Or Emet began when Londer and Garfin gathered like-minded secular Jewish friends to meet in various homes.

== Leadership ==
Or Emet co-founder Dr. Harold Londer was ordained as a Madrikh, or spiritual leader with virtually the powers of a rabbi, by the International Institute for Secular Humanistic Judaism (IISHJ) in 2007. IISHJ is the sister body of SHJ and the educational arm of the Humanistic Judaism movement. It trains humanistic rabbis and officiants as well. (IISHJ is headed by its Dean, Rabbi Adam Chalom.) Dr. Londer conducted life-cycle ceremonies such as baby namings, Bar and Bat Mitzvahs (now called "B Mitzvahs" by SHJ), weddings, and funerals. In 2024, Eva Cohen, who has served as the congregation's ritual leader since Londer's retirement, became Or Emet's first ordained Rabbi.

Or Emet is managed by an Executive Committee with five members: the President, Vice-President, Treasurer, and two members elected at-large. The ritual leader and school director serve as ex-officio members of the Executive Committee. In addition, Or Emet has a "Leadership Team", made up of the Executive Committee, the heads of all of the major committees, the other area directors (school, newsletter, press releases), and a few at-large members chosen from among senior members. The Leadership Team functions as an Advisory Board to the Executive Committee. It meets a few times a year to allow exchange of information across the various areas of the organization and to set overall goals and policies.

== Events ==
Or Emet runs two regular events a month that focus on celebrating Jewish culture in its many dimensions, providing meaningful Jewish community, and affirming Jewish identity, with rituals cast in humanistic and cultural terms. A monthly Friday evening humanistic Shabbat service is held at 7:15 PM at the Minneapolis Sabes Jewish Community Center in St. Louis Park, MN, followed by a brief speaker's program or discussion. A Jewish cultural Sunday school for children—with a parallel speaker's program for adults—is held one Sunday a month from 10 AM to 12:30 PM. The Sunday programs were previously held at Talmud Torah of St. Paul and currently (beginning September 2024) at the Twin Cities German Immersion School. Or Emet also holds annual High Holidays services (currently held at the Sabes Jewish Community Center in St. Louis Park, MN), a Passover Seder (currently held at the First Unitarian Society in Minneapolis), and an Hanukkah celebration.

Check the Or Emet website oremet.org for information, or look for Or Emet on Facebook and Instagram.

== Services and membership ==
The Jewish Cultural Sunday School for children provides students an opportunity to learn about Jewish history, traditions, and secular philosophies. The school takes a secular approach and teaches Jewish history and culture chronologically and in age-appropriate ways to "Littles" (Preschool - Kindergarten), "Middles" (grades 1 - 3), "Juniors" (grades 4 - 5), and "B'Mitzvah Preparation (grades 6 - 7). Historically and culturally significant content is introduced at the Littles level via pictures, songs, and stories; it is then reprised at a somewhat more advanced level (with more reading for example) at the Middles level, and then at an even more advanced level with Juniors and later B'Mitzvah Prep who begin to discuss ethics and values involved in stories from history. Teens get involved in practicing the central value of tikkun olam and engage in more community-service activities and other projects they choose themselves. In Fall, 2012, basic Beginning Hebrew and Jewish Music were added to the curriculum for the three younger age groups.

As of 2024, Or Emet has a membership of about 75 households (families, couples or individuals). Events such as High Holiday services and the Passover Seder and annual Hanukkah party can attract 100 or more people.

== Affiliations ==
In addition to the Society for Humanistic Judaism, Or Emet belongs to the Minnesota Council for Non-Profits, is a participating congregation in the Hebrew Immigrant Aid Society's (HIAS) Welcoming Community initiative, and has ties to other Jewish, humanist, and non-theist groups.
