= Lawrence Jones =

Lawrence or Laurence Jones may refer to:

- Lawrence Jones (businessman) (born 1968), British entrepreneur and convicted rapist
- Lawrence K. Jones, American counseling psychologist, career assessment developer and writer
- Biff Jones (Lawrence Mcceney Jones, 1895–1980), college football coach
- Lawrence B. Jones (born 1992), American conservative talk radio host, contributor to TheBlaze, and author.
- Lawrence-Jones baronets, a title in the Baronetage of the United Kingdom
- Lawrence W. Jones (1925–2023), physics professor
- Lawrence C. Jones (1893–1972), Vermont attorney and politician
- Lawrence Arthur Jones, American artist and printmaker
- L. E. Jones (1885–1969), English author

== See also ==
- Laurence Jones (disambiguation)
- Larry Jones (disambiguation)
