= Machar =

Machar may refer to:

== People ==
- Agnes Maule Machar (1837–1927), Canadian author
- Josef Svatopluk Machar (1854–1942), Czech poet and essayist
- Riek Machar (b. 1952), vice president of South Sudan
- Saint Machar, a purported 6th century Gaelic saint

== Places ==
- Machar Colony, a neighborhood in Kiamari Town, Pakistan
- Machar, Ontario, a township in Canada
- the Machars, a peninsula in southwest Scotland
- Machar (Washington, D.C.), a congregation in the Washington, DC metro area
- St Machar's Cathedral in Aberdeen, Scotland
- Machar Oilfield, a part of the Eastern Trough Area Project in the North Sea

== Other uses ==
- Machair (geography), a type of fertile low-lying raised beach
- Machar, a transliteration of the Hebrew word meaning "tomorrow"
- Macchar, Hindi and Urdu for mosquito
- an Anglicisation of Machair
