= Larry Jones =

Larry Jones may refer to:

- Larry Jones (American football coach) (1933–2013), college football coach
- Larry Jones (Boston University), American basketball player
- Larry Jones (basketball) (1941–2025), American basketball player
- Larry Jones (wide receiver) (born 1951), American football player
- Chipper Jones (Larry Wayne Jones, Jr., born 1972), American baseball player
- J. Larry Jones (born 1956), American racehorse trainer
- Zeke Jones (Larry Jones, born 1966), American Olympic wrestler
- Larry Jones (humanist), chemist
- Founder and former president of Feed the Children, charity organization

== See also ==
- Lawrence Jones (disambiguation)
