= Miriam Jerris =

President of the association of Human Rabbis

Miriam Jerris was the president of the Association of Humanistic Rabbis, and is the rabbi of the Society for Humanistic Judaism. She has been a member of the Society since 1970. In 2001, she was ordained as a rabbi by the International Institute for Secular Humanistic Judaism. She also has a PhD in Jewish studies with a specialization in pastoral counseling from the Union Institute and University in Cincinnati. In 2006, she received the Sherwin T. Wine Lifetime Achievement Award.
