= Continuum of Humanist Education =

The Continuum of Humanist Education is a project run by the Institute for Humanist Studies. It has a faculty, staff, and bookstore. It offers courses in education about the history and practise of Humanism. The introductory course is offered freely.

They adopt a commonly used motto in learning: Sapere aude.
