= Oraynu Congregation for Humanistic Judaism =

Canada's first Humanistic Jewish congregation

Oraynu Congregation for Humanistic Judaism, founded in 1969, is Canada's first Humanistic Jewish congregation. It is based in Toronto, Ontario and is affiliated with the Society for Humanistic Judaism.

Oraynu Congregation is a Canadian voice of Jews who are secularists, humanists, agnostics or atheists, and who express their Jewish identity culturally rather than through prayer. Recent surveys have shown that an increasing number of North American Jews live ever more secular lives and are less likely to believe that God exists. Humanistic Judaism makes sense to thousands of Jews worldwide with organizations now in Israel, the United States, Mexico, Australia, South America, Europe, and in countries of the former Soviet Union.

== Humanistic Judaism ==
Humanistic Judaism was founded in 1963 by Rabbi Sherwin Wine, who first articulated an approach to Judaism based on the humanistic values inherent in Judaism and Jewish writings over the millennia. Congregations are liberal and egalitarian, welcoming intermarried families and the LGBTQ community. Humanistic Jewish communities encourage and motivate people to maintain meaningful ties to Judaism and to give their children a Jewish education.

Humanistic Judaism is one of five denominations within Judaism (Reform, Conservative, Orthodox and Reconstructionist being the others). It combines attachment to Jewish identity and culture with a human-centered approach to life. It defines Judaism as the historical and cultural experience of the Jewish people. Humanistic Judaism affirms that people are independent of supernatural authority and responsible for themselves and their behavior. The secular emphasis on personal responsibility can lead to a stronger, more committed Judaism.

In an interview with Toronto writer Bill Gladstone, Rabbi Wine stated that “The Judaism of the ancient world is not the Judaism of the modern world. Judaism adapts itself to new environments. It's more accurate to view Judaism as a culture because a culture can accommodate a wide variety of belief systems. Throughout Jewish history, a wide variety of belief systems have risen and fallen on the basis of whether they're appropriate to their time. The reason Judaism has survived is because of its adaptability.”

== History ==
Oraynu began in 1969 as the Secular Jewish Association (SJA). At that time a group of secular Jews in Toronto found a new way to approach their Jewish identity, their Jewish consciousness, and the manner in which they as individuals and as a community could act this out in a meaningful way. They believed there was viability to secular Jewish life beyond strictly political, Yiddishist or Zionist ideology. The small organization attracted new members from a spectrum of Jewish experiences, particularly from the mainstream Jewish community whose focal point for Jewish awareness had been the synagogue and religion. They formed a Sunday School with a curriculum that was in keeping with the new approach.

In 1999, the group renamed itself Oraynu (meaning “our light”) Congregation for Humanistic Judaism and affiliated with the Society for Humanistic Judaism, the North American umbrella organization for secular humanistic Jews.

== Oraynu's Congregation ==
Programs include marking the High Holidays (Rosh Hashanah or Jewish New Year, and Yom Kippur or Day of Atonement), other Jewish festivals and memorial days and Shabbat (Jewish Sabbath); adult education and discussions; cultural events (Jewish-themed music, plays and art exhibits); social gatherings, social action groups and tzedakah (giving of time or money, i.e. charity) opportunities.

The Congregation creates its own humanistic services for the Jewish Festivals, including Shabbat, Rosh Hashanah, Yom Kippur, Sukkot, Tu Bishvat, Purim, Passover, Yom Hashoah V’Hagevurah and Yom Ha'atzmaut. Holiday liturgy includes philosophical readings, poetry and music, rather than prayer.

Rabbi Karen Levy speaks about what Oraynu stands for “Secular Humanistic Judaism is the smallest movement in the Jewish world today. Yet, our ethical principles -- secularism, equality, democracy, freedom, Jewish rationalism, creativity and social responsibility -- have had as great an impact in the Jewish world as any other set of Jewish ideas in the last 300 years. Our mode of operating is that we have the courage to speak truth to power. The spread of these humanistic ideals brings more justice and well-being into the world.”

Oraynu stands in solidarity with the State of Israel and with Jewish communities in Toronto and around the world.

Oraynu Congregation is a registered Canadian charity. Its legal name is Oraynu Community for Secular Humanistic Judaism.

== Beliefs ==
Rabbi Denise Handlarski defines what Humanistic Jews believe:

Humanistic Judaism is not a movement defined by what we do not believe, but rather by what we do believe. We believe that Judaism should be welcoming of all who wish to be part of our family, from those who are born into it, choose to be part of it or marry into it. We need not all be the same to recognize our shared heritage and/or connection. We believe that equality and egalitarianism should be an inherent and important part of our Judaism. We believe that Jewish history grounds us and gives us roots. We believe that Jewish creativity and human ingenuity give us branches. We believe that tradition gets a vote but not a veto. Most importantly, we believe in the power of ourselves and one another to effect meaningful and positive change in the world.

== Children's Sunday School ==
JK to Grade 7, a B’nai Mitzvah program and Oraynu-Tots preschool program

The purpose of the curriculum is to encourage a strong Secular Humanistic Jewish identity in each child by making Jewish culture, values and history come alive. Central to the School's philosophy is the value of Tikkun Olam, making the world a better place.

The program culminates at the end of Grade 7 with a group B’nai Mitzvah ceremony. Adolescents, age 13+, are part of a youth group that meets for discussion, programs and volunteer activities.

The Children's School is funded with support from the UJA Federation of Greater Toronto through the Julia and Henry Koschitzky Centre for Jewish Education.

== Oraynu Life Cycle Services ==
Oraynu offers customized life-cycle ceremonies for baby-naming and welcoming/brit tikkun (covenant of repairing the world), Bar or Bat Mitzvah, marriage/renewal of vows (Jewish, interfaith, LGBTQ) and death (funeral/memorial/unveiling) through its ordained clergy. Rabbi Eva Goldfinger, the first Humanist Rabbi in Canada, is Oraynu's Life Cycle Director.

Oraynu was the first Jewish congregation in Toronto offering officiation at interfaith weddings. In a 2014 interview, Rabbi Goldfinger is quoted as saying, “People don't get married for religious reasons; they get married for love and for having children and for getting the support system to have your dreams met. So we need to support that.” She has officiated at more than 2000 interfaith ceremonies. She comments, “You have a choice. You either embrace interfaith couples, or you lose them altogether.”

In an article for the Canadian Jewish News, Rabbi Denise Handlarski wrote, "...we have always been welcoming and celebratory of intermarriage for many reasons, one being that we care about Jewish continuity. This may seem paradoxical because most of us grew up hearing that intermarriage is the greatest threat to Jewish continuity. But it is time to stop debating what might happen as a result of intermarriage and start assessing what is happening. More and more Jews who are intermarrying are choosing to participate in Jewish life and raise children with a Jewish identity."

The congregation offers support group sessions called Intertalk for couples, families and grandparents involved in interfaith or intercultural relationships/families to help the attendees learn about and navigate community and family issues that may arise.

Oraynu has its own Jewish section in two non-denominational cemeteries, Elgin Mills Cemetery in Richmond Hill, Ontario, and Mount Zion Garden in Highland Hills Cemetery in Gormley, Ontario which offer both burial plots and cremation spaces and allows interment with a non-Jewish partner.
