= Sivan Malkin Maas =

Sivan Malkin Maas סיון מלכין מאס
- Parent: Reuven Malchin (father)

Religious life
- Religion: Judaism
- Position: Humanistic
- Organisation: International Institute for Secular Humanistic Judaism

Sivan Malkin Maas (Hebrew: סיון מלכין מאס) is an Israeli cleric who was the first Israeli to be ordained as a rabbi in Humanistic Judaism.

== Biography ==
Maas is the daughter of Yaakov Malkin, who was the editor of the journal "Free Judaism", which deals with secular humanistic Judaism. Maas was ordained by the International Institute for Secular Humanistic Judaism in 2003. Her thesis was "How to build and develop a Secular Humanistic Jewish community in Israel."

Maas founded the Institute for Training Secular Humanistic Rabbis and Jewish Leadership in Israel, which ordained its first group of secular rabbis in Israel in 2006 (five men and two women). Rather than as a religious leader, she views a rabbi as "an educator, a counselor, an expert in Jewish culture [and] an initiator and organizer of community events and a person involved in people's life-cycle events"

Maas currently directs the Jerusalem branch of the International Institute for Secular Humanistic Judaism.

== See also ==
- Timeline of women rabbis
