= Adam Chalom =

American rabbi and Humanistic Judaism leader

Adam Chalom (born October 9, 1975) is a US American rabbi and a leader in the movement of Humanistic Judaism. He is the rabbi of Kol Hadash Humanistic Congregation (KHHC) and Dean for North America of the International Institute for Secular Humanistic Judaism (IISHJ). He has also edited or co-edited several books and adult learning curricula.

== Biography ==
Chalom was born and raised in suburban Detroit, Michigan. His mother came from a Jewish leftist and Yiddish-focused family (both Sholem Aleichem Institute and Workmen’s Circle) in Detroit, while his father was raised in the Syrian Jewish community in Brooklyn, New York. He was raised attending The Birmingham Temple (now Congregation for Humanistic Judaism of Metro Detroit) in Farmington Hills, Michigan, the founding congregation of Humanistic Judaism led by Rabbi Sherwin Wine.

Chalom earned a B.A. cum laude in Judaic Studies from Yale University in 1997; a master's degree in Hebrew and Jewish Cultural Studies at the University of Michigan in 1999; rabbinic ordination from the IISHJ in 2001, and his PhD at the University of Michigan in Near Eastern Studies in 2005. His dissertation was titled “Modern Midrash: Jewish Identity and Literary Creativity.” He lives in suburban Chicago with his wife and two children.

== Contributions to Humanistic Judaism ==
Chalom worked as Rabbinic Intern at The Birmingham Temple from 1996 to 1999, then as Assistant Rabbi until his ordination in 2001. He served one year as co-Rabbi with Tamara Kolton after Sherwin Wine’s retirement before becoming the rabbi of KHHC in suburban Chicago in 2004. Having served as Assistant Dean at the IISHJ since 2004, he succeeded Sherwin Wine as IISHJ’s Dean for North America after Wine’s death in 2007. In addition to these roles, he has also served on the executive committee of the Association of Humanistic Rabbis and the editorial board of the quarterly magazine Humanistic Judaism. He is a prominent spokesperson for the movement in North America.

Chalom has written or edited several works related to Humanistic Judaism and also created an extensive library of educational and inspirational videos through the YouTube channels of KHHC and the IISHJ. Most recently, he co-edited Contemporary Humanistic Judaism: Beliefs, Values Practices (Jewish Publication Society/University of Nebraska Press, 2025, part of the Jewish Publication Society “Anthologies of Jewish Thought” series.

== Bibliography ==
=== Writer ===
- Introduction to Secular Humanistic Judaism: Part III – Philosophy of Secular Humanistic Judaism (IISHJ, 2009).
- Introduction to Secular Humanistic Judaism: Part II – Jewish Culture (IISHJ, 2007)
- Introduction to Secular Humanistic Judaism: Part I – Jewish History (IISHJ, 2002)

=== Editor ===
- Co-Editor (with Rabbi Jodi Kornfeld) and contributor, Contemporary Humanistic Judaism: Beliefs, Values, Practices (Jewish Publication Society/University of Nebraska Press, 2025).
- Editor, Introduction and contributor, Jews and the Muslim World: Solving the Puzzle – Selected Proceedings from Colloquium 2007 (IISHJ, 2010).

=== Contributor ===
- “Who Am I, That I Should Confront Pharaoh?” in Who by Plague: High Holiday Sermons from COVID-19 Times (ed. Rabbi Oren Steinitz, HaMotzi Press, 2021).
- “Massechet BB – Beyond Binaries” in Nondenominational Judaism: Perspectives on Pluralism and Inclusion in 21st Century Jewish Professional Education (Ben Yehuda Press, 2020).
- Introduction and Afterword, Judaism Beyond God by Sherwin T. Wine (IISHJ, 2017).
- “Humanistic Judaism” in The Encyclopedia of the Bible and its Reception (De Gruyter), 2016.
- “Humanistic Judaism and Secular Spirituality” in Phil Zuckerman, ed. Religion: Beyond Religion. (Macmillan Reference USA, 2016).
- “Understanding a ‘Religious’ Western Democracy: Israel and Its Complexities” in Theism and Public Policy: Humanist Perspectives and Responses (Palgrave Macmillan, 2014).
- Introduction and Afterword, A Provocative People: A Secular History of the Jews by Sherwin T. Wine (IISHJ, 2012).
- “Beyond Apikorsut: A Judaism for Secular Jews” in Zvi Gitelman, ed. Religion or Ethnicity? Jewish Identities in Evolution (Rutgers University Press, 2009).
- “Foreword” in Muraskin, Bennett. Humanist Readings in Jewish Folklore (Farmington Hills, MI: Milan Press and IISHJ, new paperback edition 2008). Also reprinted in Canadian Jewish Outlook.
- “To Destroy and to Build: The Balance of Creativity and Continuity” in Cohn-Sherbok, Cook, Rowens eds. A Life of Courage: Sherwin Wine and Humanistic Judaism (IIISHJ, 2003).
