= Tamara Kolton =

American non-denominational rabbi

Rabbi Dr. Tamara Kolton

Personal life
- Born: Tamara Ruth Feldstein; March 13, 1970 (age 56) Bloomfield Hills, Michigan
- Spouse: Isaac Kolton

Religious life
- Religion: Judaism
- Denomination: Non-denominational (formerly Humanistic)
- Website: rabbikolton.com

Tamara Ruth Kolton (née Feldstein; Hebrew: תמרה קולטון; born March 13, 1970) is an American non-denominational rabbi and clinical psychologist. She was the first person ordained as a member of the Humanistic Jewish movement. Over time, her religious position evolved from agnosticism to a more spiritual perspective that drove her away from Humanistic Judaism. Kolton later became known for her controversial feminist reinterpretation of the Biblical Eve, which has received both support and criticism from other religious and spiritual writers.

== Personal life ==
Kolton was born to Anita and Jerome Feldstein in Metro Detroit, where her family attended the non-theist Congregation for Humanistic Judaism of Metro Detroit led by Rabbi Sherwin Wine, the founder of Humanistic Judaism. She earned a Bachelor of Arts degree in international relations and English literature at the Hebrew University of Jerusalem, followed by a master's degree in clinical psychology from the Michigan School of Psychology. She later obtained a doctorate in rabbinical studies from the Union Institute, where she researched the experience of female rabbis. She is married to Isaac Kolton, an Israeli-American born in Petah Tikva. They have two children, Lior and Maya.

== Religious leadership ==
In 1999, Kolton was ordained the first Humanistic rabbi by Wine's International Institute for Secular Humanistic Judaism. She succeeded Wine as senior rabbi at the Birmingham Temple in 2004 following his retirement. In 2011, Kolton was interviewed by evolutionary biologist and atheist writer Richard Dawkins about the experience of being a Humanistic rabbi, and expanded upon the positions she and her temple held at the time. Kolton expressed skepticism regarding the historicity of earlier books of the Tanakh, though declared she found it likely later books described actual events. She defined Humanistic Judaism as a movement to preserve Jewish culture and traditions in the absence of explicit belief in God, and described herself and her congregation as "more [religiously observant] than most of the Jews in the world" for their strong preservation of traditions, such as kashrut and Shabbat observance, that are abandoned by many non-Orthodox Jews. She also discussed her strong support for interfaith marriage, something she considers "a sign of a better world in which people marry each other beyond tribal lines and religious differences", and the significant role that officiating interfaith marriages played in her practice.

Kolton left her position at the Birmingham Temple in 2012 due to experiencing a strong "spiritual calling" and feeling the need to pursue a more "soul-centered" form of Judaism. She also described significant personal and professional difficulties at the Birmingham Temple, culminating in a "terrible" board meeting during which she reportedly handed in her resignation. She later held the position of scholar-in-residence at Congregation Shir Tikvah in Troy, Michigan.

In 2020, Kolton self-published her first book, Oranges for Eve: My Brave, Beautiful, Badass Journey to the Feminine Divine. The book was inspired by her research on the sacred feminine in Judaism and re-interpretation of the Biblical Eve as a "Mother of Spiritual Bravery" figure. Kolton's theology after leaving Humanistic Judaism has oriented around feminist re-interpretation of Eve, contextualizing her story as a myth designed to separate women from their personal and spiritual power.

== #MeToo controversy ==
In 2018, Kolton published the article "The First Story In The Bible Was The First Case Of #MeToo" for The Forward. In the article, she argued that the Biblical Eve story was a misogynistic invention designed to subjugate and control female sexuality, and that it needed to be rejected and Eve re-conceptualized in order for Jewish theology to progress. John A. Cook of the Asbury Theological Seminary, while describing Kolton's support for the #MeToo movement as "laudable", referred to her theological interpretations as an "abysmal failure".
