= Jamie Otis =

American television personality

- Born: Jamie Nicole Otis; June 15, 1986 (age 40); New York City, New York, U.S.
- Occupation: Former Television Personality
- Spouse: Doug Hehner (m. 2014)
- Children: 4

Jamie Nicole Hehner (née Otis; born June 15, 1986) is an American television personality and jewelry designer who first appeared as a contestant on the sixteenth season of The Bachelor. She is best known for participating in the first season of Married at First Sight, where she met her husband, Doug Hehner. The couple was later featured in a spin-off series, Married at First Sight: The First Year. They have since appeared in several specials on FYI.

== Early life ==
Otis claims she gained custody of and raised her younger siblings when she was a college freshman even though her biological grandmother was the primary caregiver.

In 2019, she revealed that she had an abortion at eighteen after getting pregnant by the boy who took her virginity. Otis had a second abortion during nursing school.

== Personal life ==
Otis has been married to Doug Hehner since March 23, 2014. They shared the first 5 weeks of their marriage on the television series “Married at First Sight.” It has also been chronicled on their YouTube series “Married Life.” In July 2016, the couple announced that they were expecting their first child. However, a week later, Otis revealed that she had experienced a miscarriage at four months. In February 2017, the couple announced that they were expecting for a second time. On August 22, 2017, their daughter was born. On Christmas Day 2018, the Hehners announced on their new podcast that they were expecting another child. In January 2019, Otis announced that she had experienced a second miscarriage. On September 6, 2019, the Hehners announced on their podcast that they were expecting. On May 13, 2020, their son was born. In March 2024, the couple announced that they were expecting twins. On September 18, 2024, their twins were born.

== Career ==
In 2012, Otis first came into the public eye as a contestant on The Bachelor, competing for the love of Ben Flajnik in the show's sixteenth season. She was eliminated in 7th place. Later that year, Otis returned for the third season of Bachelor Pad, where she was paired up with fan David Mallet. The two were eliminated in the 4th episode.

In 2014, Otis was featured on the first season of Married at First Sight. Initially, the experts were reluctant to choose her due to her history on The Bachelor franchise, but ultimately thought she was a good fit. She was chosen to marry Doug Hehner. Six weeks after the wedding, Otis and Hehner decided to stay married and have been together ever since. In 2015-16, they starred in the reality series Married at First Sight: The First Year, a spinoff that followed their lives after the show.

Since 2016, Otis hosts Married at First Sight: Unfiltered, a show that airs after each new episode where current contestants discuss the highs and lows of their relationships. She has also done on-air hosting for The Chef's Connection and Star Shop.

Otis has one acting credit in an episode of the 2014 television series Honestly Amelia, playing Ms. Williams.

Otis launched her own fine jewelry line in New York City.

In June 2016, Otis became an author with the release of her book titled Wifey 101: Everything I Got Wrong About Finding Mr. Right.
