= Congregation Beth Adam =

Humanistic Jewish synagogue in Ohio, US

- Location in Ohio

Religion
- Affiliation: Judaism
- Rite: Independent Liberal Humanistic
- Ecclesiastical or organizational status: Synagogue
- Leadership: Rabbi Lauren Werber; Robert B. Barr, Founding Rabbi Emeritus
- Status: Active

Location
- Location: Loveland-Madeira Road, Loveland, Ohio
- Country: United States
- Interactive map of Congregation Beth Adam
- Coordinates: 39°14′14″N 84°18′19″W

Architecture
- Established: 1980

Website
- bethadam.org

Congregation Beth Adam is a Humanistic Jewish synagogue located in Loveland, Ohio. Beth Adam gives voice to Judaism with a humanistic perspective. The congregation was founded by Rabbi Robert B. Barr in 1980.

== Overview ==
Beth Adam's mission is to be a "unique community integrating Jewish tradition and humanistic principles." Its vision - to be "a spiritual home, a meaningful voice, and a humanistic resource for people worldwide, seeking a contemporary Jewish identity and experience."

The congregation made history when its application for membership into the Union of American Hebrew Congregations (UAHC) (now the Union of Reform Judaism (URJ)) was not accepted. Beth Adam's application challenged the Reform movement to determine if it was willing to embrace a wide spectrum of belief. As Rabbi Alan Kaplan, then head of the union's New Congregations Committee, the decision will be "a watershed in the history of the Reform movement".

== Location ==
Congregation Beth Adam's building, located on Loveland-Madeira Road, was dedicated on September 7, 2001. The synagogue is unique in that it fully incorporates science into its religious space. In the sanctuary, the 12 stained-glass windows depict the Big Bang, evolution of life on earth, and science. The Eternal Light (Ner Tamid) that is over the ark which holds the Torah is a double helix representing DNA.

== Services ==
Congregation Beth Adam launched its online initiative OurJewishCommunity.org. This was one of the first online Jewish congregations in the United States. As technology has changed, OurJewishCommunity.org has been fully integrated into Beth Adam's primary website. Both Beth Adam and OurJewishCommunity operate Facebook pages to serve those in greater Cincinnati and those outside the community.

Congregation Beth Adam launched Our Village, a revolutionary approach to youth education. The program has been redesigned to provide experiential learning opportunities rather than the traditional mode of religious education.
