= The Humanist Institute =

Humanist association

- Abbreviation: THI
- Formation: 1982
- Type: Educational non-profit
- Key people: Kristin Wintermute, Executive Director
- Website: http://humanistinstitute.org/

The Humanist Institute is a training program for leaders within the humanist, and secular humanist movement.

== Purpose and organization ==
The Humanist Institute offers several kinds of educational programs to the humanist community. These programs range from a two and a half year graduate certificate program, one day training seminars, and online courses. The institute operates as a 501c3, educational organization. THI is an affiliate of the American Humanist Association with an independent Board of Directors, executive director, Co-Deans, and staff. The mission of THI is to be the leading center for humanist education serving all branches of humanism. The vision of THI is to provide educational opportunities that serve humanist and secular communities in world where humanism is widely accepted and respected life-stance.

== History ==
The institute was founded to educate and train effective leaders, organizers, and advocates for a variety of organizational settings, including within the humanist movement itself.

The idea for the Humanist Institute originated in Pittsburgh in 1976 and was the brainchild of Paul Beattie, a Unitarian Universalist minister. In August 1982, Rabbi Sherwin Wine organized a gathering of forty-five humanist leaders at the University of Chicago [where] the North American Committee for Humanism [NACH] was formed with Rabbi Wine as president. This new alliance was a response to the urgent need to defend humanism against the assaults of its enemies and to find an effective way to bring the message of humanism to a wider public. It was at this meeting that the Humanist Institute was voted to be established.

It was at this meeting that NACH founded The Humanist Institute. The founding members of the institute were Khoren Arisian, Paul Beattie, Ed Ericson, Paul Kurtz, Howard Radest, Lyle Simpson, and Sherwin Wine. Sherwin Wine served as the founding president with Howard Radest as the founding Dean. They were soon joined by feminist humanists Miriam Jerris and Jean Kotkin. Each of the original founders were themselves either leaders or founders of other humanist or humanistic organizations such as: the Society for Humanistic Judaism, the Council for Secular Humanism, the American Ethical Union, the Unitarian Universalist Association and the American Humanism Association.

In March 1984, The Humanist Institute was launched. The first class with students from the AEU, AHA, UUA, and SHJ gathered in New York at the Ethical Culture center for the first seminar with Howard Radest as mentor. It was the first trans-denominational, trans-humanist organization program for the education of humanist leaders.

== Educational Programs ==
The institute's foundation is its independent graduate level program that works in cooperation with existing humanist organizations, granting a certificate in Humanist Studies and Leadership. Students enrolled in the certificate program are provided a unique opportunity to collaborate with a diverse faculty and student body for whom take a non-theistic, naturalistic approach to humanism, whether interpreted in secular or religious terms. They are given an analytical understanding of humanism as a life-stance acquiring a deep theoretical understanding of humanism across the spectrum and practical application on a personal and professional basis. It is a low-residency distance learning program involving 8 sessions over 2 1/2 years. The curriculum includes: The Humanist Life Stance, Humanist Values & Principles, Humanism in Relation to Others, Essential Humanist Tools (Critical Thinking), Foundation Blocks for Humanism (Physical, Life and Social Sciences), Applying Humanism to Life (Leadership) and Aesthetics & Rituals.

In 2012, the Kochhar Online Humanist Education (KOHE) courses were added to the institute's offerings. KOHE provides an array of self-guided courses introducing individuals to humanism and giving a means to explore at basic level humanist theory and practice. KOHE was the Internet's first website offering interactive courses in humanist thought.

In 2014, the Institute launched onsite training programs in conjunction with the Humanist Society, an endorsing organization for Humanist Celebrants across the United States. These trainings help Celebrants learn how to perform weddings, assist in end of life, conduct memorial services and celebrate other important life milestones. Day long workshops were piloted in 2015 as a part of an Educational Series Weekend. The American Humanist Association's Appignani Legal Center and LGBTQ Counsel worked with the institute to provide "Secularism Today: Establishment Clause Jurisprudence" and "Humanism, Atheism & LGBTQ Communities".
