= Kahal B'raira =

Humanistic Jewish synagogue in Massachusetts, US

Kahal B’raira
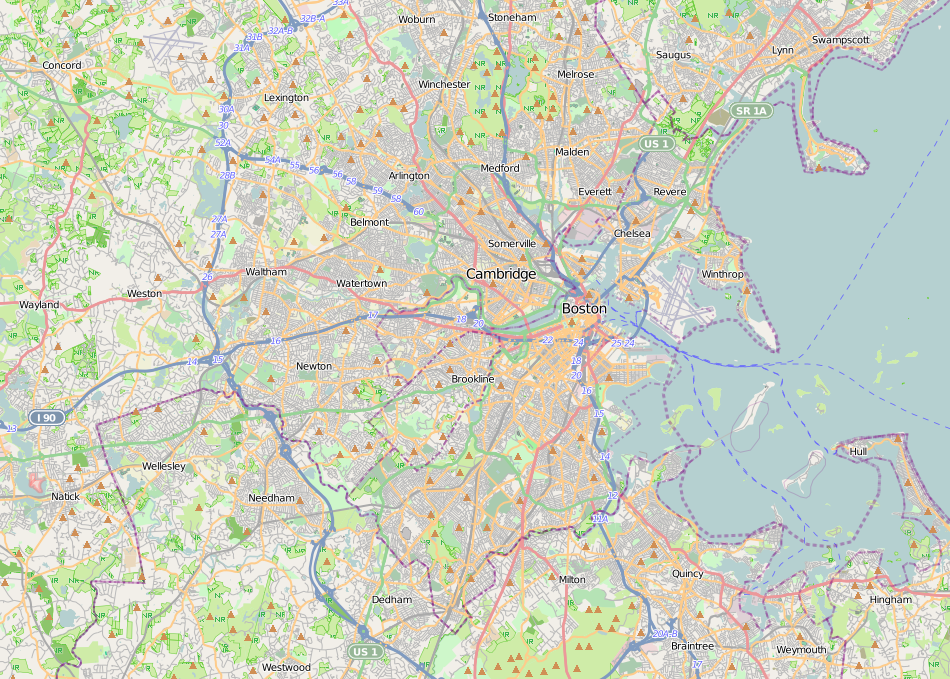
- Location in greater Boston

Religion
- Affiliation: Judaism
- Rite: Humanistic
- Ecclesiastical or organisational status: Synagogue
- Status: Active

Location
- Location: 765 Concord Avenue, Cambridge, Boston, Massachusetts
- Country: United States
- Administration: Society for Humanistic Judaism
- Coordinates: 42.3914°N 71.1542°W

Architecture
- Established: 1975

Website
- kahalbraira.org

Kahal B’raira (Hebrew: קְהַל־בְּרֵרָה, romanized: Qəhal Bərērā, lit. 'Community of Choice') is a Humanistic Jewish synagogue located at 765 Concord Avenue, Cambridge, a suburb of Boston, Massachusetts, in the United States.

Affiliated with the Society for Humanistic Judaism, Kahal B’raira (pronounced ka-HAL breyra) has offered a nontheistic alternative in contemporary Jewish life since 1975. The congregation aims to welcome all who identify with the history, culture and fate of the Jewish people, including interfaith and LGBT families.

== Services ==
=== Sunday School ===
Kahal B'raira offers secular Jewish education for young people ages 3–14. It also offers bene mitzvah and teen programming including a youth group and employment opportunities in the Sunday School. Students involved in the bene mitzvah program and the youth group also undertake additional social action projects. The Sunday School collects tzedakah in class throughout the year and then collectively decides which causes to support.

=== Sunday meetings ===
The congregation primarily draws members from Eastern and Central Massachusetts. Adults meet concurrently with the Sunday School 15 times a year. The morning with the children and adults together. After the children leave for class, adult members participate in member-led secular services and attend a featured presentation by a guest lecturer on a topic typically related to Jewish culture, humanism, history, philosophy, the arts, society, politics, or other issues. Some past topics include When General Grant Expelled the Jews by Jonathan Sarna, “Current events in the Middle East”, “Jewish Cooking”, and an annual book group (past books have included The Zookeeper's Wife by Diane Ackerman, Patrimony by Philip Roth, and What Remains by Nicholas Delbanco.

=== Adult education ===
In addition to Sunday morning programming, adult members may participate in additional Adult Education classes. These may be member led, or may be in a weekend seminar taught by a Scholar-in-Residence. Weekend seminars have been held in 2009 and 2010. Another seminar is planned for the weekend from December 13–15, 2013.

== Holidays ==
The major Jewish holidays are celebrated include high holiday services, building of and eating in the sukkah, a Tu Bishvat program, a congregational Passover Seder, a Hanukkah meal and party and periodic Shabbat services and get-togethers.

== Social action and community involvement ==
The congregation aims to encourage activities related to social service and social justice, adult education, and social events. The community is lay-led.

The congregation also has a social action committee which coordinates events over the course of the year. Ongoing events have included a blood drive, volunteering at Gaining Ground Farm, serving meals on Christmas at First Church Shelter, contributing to Jewish Family and Children's Services' Family Table food pantry, participating in the Martin Luther King, Jr. Day of service in partnership with the City Mission Society, adopting needy children/families at holiday time and bringing journaling workshops to women incarcerated at Massachusetts Correctional Institution – Framingham, and also through the congregation's "Sheltering Arts Program."

The congregation's Chesed (Caring) committee offers support to members facing medical illness or other crises helping members in need.

== Social events ==
The Kahal B’raira community also offers informal social events throughout the year including organized potluck dinners, an annual winter get-away weekend, group outings to Red Sox games, a summer barbecue and a day at the beach.

== See also ==
- Jewish culture
- International Institute for Secular Humanistic Judaism
