= Laurence Jones =

Laurence Jones may refer to:

- Sir Laurence Jones (Royal Air Force officer) (1933–1995), Royal Air Force commander
- Laurence Jones (musician) (born 1992), English blues rock guitarist and singer-songwriter
- Laurence C. Jones (1884–1975), founder and president of Piney Woods Country Life School, Mississippi

== See also ==
- Lawrence Jones (disambiguation)
