= Married at First Sight (American TV series) =

Reality television series

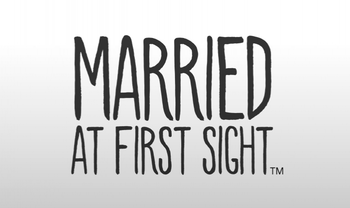
- Genre: Reality television
- Based on: Gift Ved Første Blik (Danish TV series)
- Opening theme: "All or Nothing" by Louise Dowd, Jason Tarver & Marc Williams
- Ending theme: "All or Nothing" by Louise Dowd, Jason Tarver & Marc Williams
- Country of origin: United States
- Original language: English
- No. of seasons: 20
- No. of episodes: 224

Production
- Executive producers: Chris Coelen; Eric Detwiler; Montré Burton
- Running time: 42 minutes
- Production company: Kinetic Content

Original release
- Network: FYI
- Release: July 8, 2014 – November 1, 2016
- Network: Lifetime
- Release: April 20, 2017 – March 25, 2025
- Network: Peacock
- Release: October 23, 2025 – present

Married at First Sight is an American reality television series that first aired on July 8, 2014, on FYI. It later moved to Lifetime and Peacock.

The series is based on a Danish series titled Gift ved første blik that first aired on September 4, 2013, on DR3. The original Danish series format has been sold to broadcasters throughout the world.

== Production and broadcast ==
The series first aired in the United States on FYI. Beginning with season two, it aired in simulcast on sister network A&E. In 2017, for its fifth season, the show moved to sister network Lifetime. The following year, two spin-offs were announced to premiere that October, Married at First Sight: Honeymoon Island and Married at First Sight: Happily Ever After. In January 2025, after 18 seasons on A&E Networks, it was announced that Peacock had acquired the rights to the series beginning with the upcoming season 19.

== Format ==
The series features three to five couples, paired up by relationship experts, who agree to marry when they first meet. For the first three seasons, the experts were clinical psychologist Joseph Cilona, sexologist Logan Levkoff, sociologist Pepper Schwartz, and humanist chaplain Greg Epstein. Starting with the fourth season, the experts were Schwartz, pastor and marriage counselor Calvin Roberson, and communication and relationship expert Rachel DeAlto. Rachel DeAlto was replaced with Jessica Griffin beginning with the sixth season. Griffin stayed until the ninth season and was replaced by Viviana Coles in seasons ten and eleven.

The couples spend their wedding night in a hotel before leaving for a honeymoon. Upon returning home, they live together as a married couple for the remainder of the eight weeks. Thereafter, they must choose to divorce or stay married.

== Synopsis ==
Over the twenty completed seasons of MAFS, 86 couples have been matched. 46 of them (53%) mutually chose to stay married on Decision Day, out of which over two-thirds have since divorced, filed for divorce, or announced their divorce. As of October 2026, this left only 12 couples married, making for a current overall success rate of 13.9%.

As a point of comparison, according to the Centers for Disease Prevention and Control (CDC), the marital success rate nationwide is around 58%.

=== Season 1 ===
The first season took place in New York City and northern New Jersey, and premiered July 8, 2014. The couples were:

#	Couple	Age	Occupation	Final Decision	Current Status	Children	New marriage (nm) / new relationship (nr)	Children in nm / nr
1	Jamie Otis-Hehner	27	Nurse	Yes	Married	4		
1	Doug Hehner	31	Software salesman	Yes	Married	4		
2	Cortney Hendrix	26	Make-up artist	Yes	Divorced	-	yes (nm)	2
2	Jason Carrion	27	EMT	Yes	Divorced	-	yes (nm)	1
3	Monet Bell	33	Product development manager	No	Divorced			
3	Vaughn Copeland	30	Field service technician	No	Divorced			

In March 2019, Cortney and Jason divorced after five years of marriage. Since their divorce, Cortney and Jason have both moved on. Jason married actress Roxanne Pallett in January 2020. In June 2021, they announced they were expecting their first child together. Cortney married Sherm, an accountant, in October 2020. In April 2021, they announced they were expecting their first child together. In October 2021, Cortney gave birth to her and Sherm's first child, a baby boy. In February 2023, they announced they were expecting their second child together.

Jamie and Doug are now a family of six. The couple lost their first son, Jonathan Edward, at 17 weeks gestation in July 2016, before going on to have daughter Henley Grace in August 2017. They have spoken about subsequent struggles to conceive, experiencing a chemical pregnancy in 2018 and a miscarriage at 10 weeks along in 2019. Their son, Hendrix Douglas, was born in May 2020. In February 2024, they announced that they were expecting their third child (which later turned out to be twins). Their twin boys were born in September 2024.

=== Season 2 ===
The second season, like the first, took place in New York City and Northern New Jersey, and premiered on March 17, 2015. The couples were:

#	Couple	Age	Occupation	Final Decision	Current Status	Children	New marriage (nm) / new relationship (nr)	Children in nm / nr
1	Jaclyn Methuen	30	Vodka saleswoman	Yes	Divorced	-	yes	2
1	Ryan Ranellone	28	Real estate agent	Yes	Divorced	-		
2	Davina Kullar (now Davis)	34	Pharmaceutical saleswoman	No	Divorced	-	yes (nm)	2
2	Sean Varricchio	35	Trauma nurse	No	Divorced	-	yes	1
3	Jessica Castro	30	Receptionist	Yes	Divorced	-	yes	1
3	Ryan DeNino/Oehl	29	Businessman	Yes	Divorced	-		

Concluding Jaclyn's and Ryan's marriage, Jaclyn entered into another relationship in 2018 and announced she was expecting a child in 2019. She had a daughter in November 2019. As of 2021, Ryan is still single.

Davina is now married with a son named Hudson. As of 2021, Sean is married with a daughter.

Jessica Castro and Ryan DeNino had a contentious relationship, with Ryan threatening to harm Jessica on multiple occasions. Jessica filed a restraining order against him in June 2015. As of 2021, Jessica Castro is in a relationship and has a son with him. On August 14, 2026, Ryan’s sister announced on social media that he had suddenly passed away. He was 40 years old.

=== Season 3 ===
The third season was set in Atlanta, Georgia, and premiered on December 1, 2015. The couples were:

#	Couple	Age	Occupation	Final Decision	Current Status	Children	New marriage (nm)/ new relationship (nr)	Children in nm / nr
1	Vanessa Nelson	26	Event manager	Yes	Divorced	-		
1	Tres Russell	27	Luxury car salesman	Yes	Divorced	-		
2	Ashley Doherty	30	Nursing student	No	Divorced	-	yes (nm)	1
2	David Norton	29	Software account executive	Yes	Divorced	-		
3	Samantha Role	30	Bank manager	Yes	Divorced	-	yes (nm)	3
3	Neil Bowlus	31	Compliance specialist	No	Divorced	-		

Vanessa and Tres got divorced within six months of Decision Day. Vanessa appeared on Married At First Sight: Second Chances in 2017 and married Andre Forbes. Their marriage also ended in divorce. As of 2020, Tres was in a "complicated" relationship. As of 2021, Vanessa appeared to be single.

After divorcing David, Ashley learned that he had a history of misdemeanors. In 2019, Ashley shared a photo from her wedding. In 2020, Ashley announced that she was pregnant and gave birth to a son in April 2021.

In April 2018, Samantha married Chris Wise and in September gave birth to a daughter. In March 2022 Samantha gave birth to twins. Samantha and Neil are still friends. In April 2020, Neil revealed that he is in a relationship.

=== Season 4 ===
The fourth season premiered on Tuesday, July 26, 2016. The setting was South Florida (particularly Miami), and two new specialists joined alongside sociologist Pepper Schwartz: communication and relationship expert Rachel DeAlto, and marriage counselor Pastor Calvin Roberson. Doctors Joseph Cilona and Logan Levkoff exited the series after season three. The couples were:

#	Couple	Age	Occupation	Final Decision	Current Status	Children	New marriage (nm) / new relationship (nr)	Children in nm / nr
1	Sonia Granados	33	Social worker	Yes	Divorced	-	yes (nr)	
1	Nick Pendergrast	32	Vacation rental manager	Yes	Divorced	-	yes	2 (twins)
2	Heather Seidel	32	Flight attendant	No_{1}	Divorced	-	yes	1
2	Derek Schwartz	35	Account executive	No_{1}	Divorced	-		
3	Lillian Vilchez	24	Realtor	Yes	Divorced	-		
3	Tom Wilson	29	Boat interior designer	Yes	Divorced	-	yes	

_{1} Heather and Derek left in the middle of the experiment.

Sonia and Nick divorced after about a year of marriage. That same year, Nick announced that he was in a relationship and they were expecting twins. In 2019, Nick was in a work accident that left him partially paralyzed. He has recovered from the incident. Sonia has started a podcast and as of 2021 is still single.

Heather and Derek left the show ten days after they were married.

Tom and Lillian announced their divorce in May 2017. As of 2021, Lillian was single. In 2019, Tom announced that he was engaged to Michelle, and they were married three months later. Tom is a step-father to Michelle's two children from a previous marriage.

=== Season 5 ===
The fifth season was renewed on October 25, 2016. For this season, the show moved to Lifetime. It premiered on April 20, 2017, and featured couples in Chicago. The couples were:

#	Couple	Age	Occupation	Final Decision	Current Status	Children	New marriage (nm) / new relationship (nr)	Children in new marriage / relationship
1	Danielle DeGroot	30	Dietician	Yes	Divorced	-	no	?
1	Cody Knapek	26	Trainer / gym owner	Yes	Divorced	-	yes	
2	Sheila Downs	31	School district facility director	Yes	Divorced	-	yes	
2	Nate Duhon	26	Branch manager of a car rental company	Yes	Divorced	-	yes	
3	Ashley Petta	30	Manager of family-owned bar & grill	Yes	Married	2		
3	Anthony D'Amico	33	Sale account executive	Yes	Married	2		

Ashley Petta and Anthony D'Amico are now a family of four. They announced they were expecting their first child in August 2018. They welcomed their first child, daughter Mila Rose, in January 2019. In July 2020, they announced they were expecting their second child, which was later revealed to be another girl. In February 2021, their second daughter, Vaeda Marie, was born.

As of October 2021, Nate is in a relationship, and has his own business. Sheila is married.

=== Season 6 ===
The sixth season was renewed by Lifetime, and premiered on January 2, 2018, and featured couples in Boston. Relationship expert Jessica Griffin joined the show as a specialist, replacing Rachel DeAlto, who left after Season 5. The couples were:

#	Couple	Age	Occupation	Final Decision	Current Status	Children	New marriage (nm) / new relationship (nr)	Children in new marriage / relationship
1	Shawniece Jackson	29	Cosmetologist	Yes	Married	1		
1	Jephte Pierre	26	2nd grade school teacher	Yes	Married	1		
2	Molly Duff	25	Commercial insurance adjuster	No	Divorced	-		
2	Jonathan Francetic	28	Financial associate	No	Divorced	-	yes (engaged)	
3	Jaclyn Schwartzberg	29	Technical sales representative	Yes	Divorced	-	yes (nm)	1
3	Ryan Buckley	29	Firefighter	Yes	Divorced	-		

Shawniece Jackson and Jephte Pierre welcomed their first child, a baby girl named Laura Denise Pierre, in August 2018.

Jonathan Francetic and relationship expert Jessica Griffin revealed they had struck up a romance following his time on the show when Griffin announced she would not be returning to Married At First Sight as an expert for Season 9. They began dating more than five months after the season wrapped. The pair became engaged in April 2019. Their original wedding date was set for October 2020 but was postponed due to the COVID-19 pandemic. As of October 18, 2022, Fracentic and Griffin are officially married.

In September 2020, Jaclyn married Dane, with whom she had been in a relationship with since late 2018. As of 2021, Ryan is still single.

=== Season 7 ===
The seventh season was renewed by Lifetime, and featured couples from Dallas, with the premiere airing on July 10, 2018. The couples were:

#	Couple	Age	Occupation	Final Decision	Current Status	Children	Remarried / new relationship	Children in new marriage / relationship
1	Mia Bally	29	International recruiter of an airline	Yes	Divorced	-	?	?
1	Tristan Thompson	29	Tutoring club owner	Yes	Divorced	-	yes	1
2	Danielle Bergman-Dodd	30	Software saleswoman	Yes	Married	3		
2	Bobby Dodd	27	Construction project manager	Yes	Married	3		
3	Amber Martorana	36	Senior title analyst	Yes	Divorced	-	?	?
3	Dave Flaherty	37	High yield bond trader	Yes	Divorced	-	?	?

Danielle Bergman-Dodd and Bobby Dodd have three children together. Their first child, Olivia Nicole, was born in February 2019. Their second child, Bobby Dodd IV, was born in December 2020. Their third child and second daughter, Savannah Ann, was born in September 2023.

In July 2020, Tristan married Rachel, who he had been in a relationship with since early 2019. In March 2021, they welcomed their first child together, a baby boy named Phoenix. As of 2021, Mia is still single.

As of 2021, both Dave and Amber are still single.

=== Season 8 ===
The eighth season featured couples from Philadelphia, was the first season that featured a fourth couple, and premiered on January 1, 2019. The couples were:

#	Couple	Age	Occupation	Final Decision	Current Status	Children	Remarried / new relationship	Children in new marriage / relationship
1	Stephanie Sersen	35	Financial consultant	Yes	Married	-		
1	AJ Vollmoeller	37	President & CEO of a staffing & recruiting company	Yes	Married	-		
2	Jasmine McGriff	30	Assistant director	Yes	Divorced	-	yes	1
2	Will Guess	37	Financial analyst	No	Divorced	-		
3	Kate Sisk	28	Hotel marketing specialist	No	Divorced	-	?	?
3	Luke Cuccurullo	31	Civil and environmental engineer	No	Divorced	-	yes (nr)	
4	Kristine Killingsworth	29	Residential real estate agent	Yes	Married	-		
4	Keith Dewar	29	Kidney dialysis patient care technician	Yes	Married	-		

Stephanie and AJ are still married. In 2021, after 3 years of marriage, the couple relocated to Key West, Florida.

Kristine and Keith are still married. In April 2019, after 8 months of marriage, the couple bought a house.

Jasmine is now in a relationship, though her marital status in unknown. She welcomed her first child, a son, in December 2020. As of 2021, Will is still single.

As of 2021, Kate is still single. In early 2021, Luke was in a relationship, however, due to lack of social media posts in recent months, the status of that relationship is currently unknown.

=== Season 9 ===
The ninth season featured couples from Charlotte, North Carolina and premiered on June 12, 2019. Jessica Griffin did not return after revealing she was in a relationship with Season 6 cast member Jon Francetic, with the couple later getting engaged and going into business together. She was replaced by relationship expert Viviana Coles. The couples were:

#	Couple	Age	Occupation	Final Decision	Current Status	Children	Remarried / new relationship	Children in new marriage / relationship
1	Iris Caldwell	27	Non-profit program coordinator	Yes	Divorced	-	?	?
1	Keith Manley	27	Mentor/coach	No	Divorced	-	?	?
2	Elizabeth Bice	29	Account executive	Yes	Divorcing	-		
2	Jamie Thompson	35	Financial technician	Yes	Divorcing	-		
3	Deonna McNeill Okotie	30	Operations manager	Yes	Married	1		
3	Gregory Okotie	32	Math learning center owner	Yes	Married	1		
4	Amber Bowles	27	Middle school teacher	No	Divorced	-	yes (nm)	1
4	Matthew Gwynne	31	Ex-professional basketball player	No	Divorced	-	?	?

In September 2020, Deonna McNeill and Greg Okotie announced that they are expecting their first child together. In February 2021, Deonna gave birth to their son, Declan.

Elizabeth Bice and Jamie Thompson have separated shortly before their 4th anniversary and announced their upcoming divorce.

=== Season 10 ===
The tenth season featured couples from the suburbs outside of Washington, D.C., particularly Arlington and Alexandria, Virginia. This season was the first that featured a fifth couple. It premiered on January 1, 2020. The couples were:

#	Couple	Age	Occupation	Final Decision	Current Status	Children	Remarried / new relationship	Children in new marriage / relationship
1	Katie Conrad	25	Mental health professional	Yes	Divorced	-	yes	
1	Derek Sherman	26	Cyber security engineer	Yes	Divorced	-	?	?
2	Jessica Studer Hurd	31	Nurse manager	Yes	Married	3		
2	Austin Hurd	31	Network technician	Yes	Married	3		
3	Taylor Dunklin	27	Research scientist	No	Annulled	-	?	?
3	Brandon Reid	34	Sales manager	No	Annulled	-	?	?
4	Meka Jones	25	Category analyst	No	Annulled	-	?	?
4	Michael Watson	31	Education director	No	Annulled	-	yes	
5	Mindy Shiben	34	Figure skating coach	No	Divorced	-	?	?
5	Zach Justice	32	Fitness professional	No	Divorced	-	?	?

In July 2021, Austin and Jessica revealed that they are expecting their first child, due in November 2021. In October 2021, Austin and Jessica revealed that their first child would be a boy. Their son, Westin Paul, was born in November 2021. Their second son, Everett, was born in August 2024. In April 2026, the couple announced they were expecting their third child.

While the season is marketed as taking place in DC and features shots in the tourist-heavy sections of the District, the majority of the show takes place in Northern Virginia with some areas in Montgomery County, Maryland. However, the weddings take place in the District neighborhood of Georgetown.

=== Season 11 ===
The eleventh season featured couples from New Orleans, and premiered on July 15, 2020. The couples were:

#	Couple	Age	Occupation	Final Decision	Current Status	Children	Remarried (RM) / new relationship (NR)	Children in new marriage / relationship
1	Amelia Fatsi	27	Physician	Yes	Divorced	-	NR	
1	Bennett Kirschner	28	Artistic director of a theater company	Yes	Divorced	-		
2	Olivia Cornu	30	Nurse practitioner	No	Divorced	-		
2	Brett Lindsey	35	Certified AWS cloud practitioner	No	Divorced	-		
3	Karen Landry	30	Human resources consultant	Yes	Divorced	-		
3	Miles Williams	26	Children & youth educator	Yes	Divorced	-		
4	Amani Smith	29	Nonprofit field	Yes	Married	2		
4	Woody Randall	30	Teacher and coach/mentor	Yes	Married	2		
5	Christina Croce	30	Flight attendant	No	Divorced	-		
5	Henry Rodriguez	35	Clinical recruiter	No	Divorced	-	Yes (NR)	

Miles and Woody made Married At First Sight history by being the first best friends to apply together and be selected at the same time.

Amani and Woody welcomed their first child, a boy named Reign, in June 2022. In November 2023, their second son, Rai, was born.

=== Season 12 ===
The twelfth season was set in Atlanta, and premiered on January 13, 2021. It is the first to feature a divorced candidate. The couples were:

#	Couple	Age	Occupation	Final Decision	Current Status
1	Haley Harris	28	Account Executive	No	Divorced
1	Jacob Harter	38	Senior IT Analyst	No	Divorced
2	Paige Banks	25	Accountant	No	Divorced
2	Chris Williams	27	Finance Manager & Entrepreneur	Yes	Divorced
3	Briana Myles	28	Engineer	Yes	Married
3	Vincent Morales	28	Auto Broker	Yes	Married
4	Clara Berghaus	27	Flight Attendant	Yes	Divorced
4	Ryan Oubré	29	Project Manager	Yes	Divorced
5	Virginia Coombs	26	Account Coordinator	Yes	Divorced
5	Erik Lake	33	Pilot	Yes	Divorced

Another first occurred in this season when Chris' former fiancée contacted him while he was on his honeymoon to let him know she was pregnant.

In July 2022, Briana and Vincent announced that they were expecting their first child. In August 2022, they revealed that their first child would be a girl. Their daughter, Aury Bella, was born in January 2023.

=== Season 13 ===
The thirteenth season featured couples from Houston and premiered on July 21, 2021.

#	Couple	Age	Occupation	Final Decision	Current Status
1	Michaela Clark	30	Realtor	Yes	Divorced
1	Zack Freeman	27	Finance	No	Divorced
2	Rachel Gordillo	33	Special Education Evaluator	Yes	Divorced
2	Jose San Miguel	35	Mission Flight Specialist	Yes	Divorced
3	Bao Huong Hoang	35	Research Administrative Director	No	Divorced
3	Johnny Lam	35	IT Project Manager	Yes	Divorced
4	Myrla Féria	34	Leadership coach	Yes	Divorced
4	Gil Cuero	35	Firefighter	Yes	Divorced
5	Brett Layton	33	Teacher & Volleyball Coach	No	Divorced
5	Ryan Ignasiak	35	Oil & Gas Liaison	No	Divorced

=== Season 14 ===
The fourteenth season featured couples from Boston and premiered on January 5, 2022.

#	Couple	Age	Occupation	Final Decision	Current Status
1	Jasmina Outar	29	Early Childhood Educator	Yes	Divorced
1	Michael Morency	28	Personal Trainer	Yes	Divorced
2	Katina Goode	29	Benefit Calculation Analyst	Yes	Divorced
2	Olajuwon Dickerson	29	Municipal Wastewater Operator	Yes	Divorced
3	Lindsey Gergoulis	34	Healthcare Project Manager	Yes	Divorced
3	Mark Maher	37	Regional Sales Director	Yes	Divorced
4	Noi Phommasak	33	Talent Acquisition Coordinator	Yes	Divorced
4	Steve Moy	38	Former Sales Engineer	Yes	Divorced
5	Alyssa Ellman	30	Social Media Manager	No_{1}	Divorced
5	Chris Collette	35	Realtor	No_{1}	Divorced

_{1} Alyssa and Chris left in the middle of the experiment.

=== Season 15 ===
The fifteenth season featured couples from San Diego and premiered on July 6, 2022, on Lifetime.

#	Couple	Age	Occupation	Final Decision	Current Status
1	Stacia Karcher	37	Accountant	Yes	Divorced
1	Nate Barnes	34	Day trader	Yes	Divorced
2	Alexis Williams	29	Logistic specialist	Yes, then No the day after	Divorced
2	Justin Hall	33	Digital Marketing Specialist	Yes, then No the day after	Divorced
3	Lindy Elloway	29	Physical therapy doctor	Yes	Divorced
3	Miguel Santiago	35	Medical technical writer	Yes	Divorced
4	Morgan Bell	29	Registered nurse	No_{1}	Divorced
4	Binh Trinh	29	Engineer	No_{1}	Divorced
5	Krysten Collins	32	Sales representative	No	Divorced
5	Mitch Silverstein	41	Environmental policy advocate	No	Divorced

_{1} Morgan and Binh left in the middle of the experiment.

=== Season 16 ===
The sixteenth season featured couples from Nashville and premiered on January 4, 2023, on Lifetime.

#	Couple	Age	Occupation	Final Decision	Current Status
1	Jasmine Secrest	32	Competitive cheerleading coach	No	Divorced
1	Airris Williams	39	Software engineer instructor	No	Divorced
2	Nicole Lilienthal-Thielk	32	Senior marketing advisor	Yes	Married
2	Christopher Thielk	36	Business coach	Yes	Married
3	Gina Micheletti	35	Hairstylist & salon owner	No	Divorced
3	Clint Webb	40	Account executive	No	Divorced
4	Domynique Kloss	25	Associate sales broker	No_{1}	Divorced
4	Mackinley Gilbert	34	Director of operations	No_{1}	Divorced
5	Kirsten Grimes	32	Real estate agent	Yes	Divorced
5	Shaquille Dillon	31	Executive director	No	Divorced

In July 2025, Nicole and Christopher announced that they were expecting twins. Their daughter, Sofia Lily, and son, Anthony Ramsay, were born January 6, 2026.

_{1} Domynique and Mackinley left in the middle of the experiment.

=== Season 17 ===
The seventeenth season premiered on October 18, 2023, and featured couples from Denver.

#	Couple	Age	Occupation	Final Decision	Current Status
1	Emily Balch	30	Senior NetSuite Consultant	No	Divorced
1	Brennan Shoykhet	28	Senior Account Management Specialist in B2B Sales and Marketing	No	Divorced
2	Clare Kerr	28	Therapist	No	Divorced
2	Cameron Frazer	33	Co-Founder, Broken Carbon	No	Divorced
3	Becca Haley	32	Photographer	Yes, then No the day after	Divorced
3	Austin Reed	32	Business Development Representative, Solar Power Pros Inc.	Yes, then No the day after	Divorced
4	Orion Martzloff	27	Independent Contractor	No_{1}	Divorced
4	Lauren Goodger	31	Federal Budget Officer	No_{1}	Divorced
5	Michael Shiakallis	39	Head of SMS Digital Experience, Lumen Technologies	No	Divorced
5	Chloe Brown	40	Senior Director at the American Heart Association	Yes	Divorced

_{1} Orion and Lauren decided to divorce in the middle of the experiment, but remained on the show.

=== Season 18 ===
The eighteenth season featured couples from Chicago and premiered on October 15, 2024.

#	Couple	Age	Occupation	Final Decision	Current Status
1	Emem Obot	34	Nurse practitioner	No	Divorced
1	Ikechi Ojore	41	College counselor	No	Divorced
2	Michelle Tomblin	38	Executive assistant	No	Divorced
2	David Trimble	36	Project manager	No	Divorced
3	Madison Myers	29	Software consultant	No	Divorced
3	Allen Slovick	35	Financial systems manager	No	Divorced
4	Camille Parsons	32	Director of operations	Yes	Married
4	Thomas McDonald	42	Banker	Yes	Married
5	Karla Juarez	33	Professional hairstylist	No	Divorced
5	Juan Franco	36	Sales executive	No	Divorced

Madison and David began a relationship while still married to their respective spouses. They announced their engagement in March 2026.

=== Season 19 ===
The nineteenth season featured couples from Austin and was the first to air on Peacock.

#	Couple	Age	Occupation	Final Decision	Current Status
1	Josh	31	Contractor	Yes	Divorced
1	Jalyn	27	Realtor	Yes	Divorced
2	Pat	59	Space operations consultant	Yes	Divorced
2	Rhonda	63	Performance marketing executive	Yes	Divorced
3	Chad	54	Real estate executive	Yes	Divorced
3	Belynda	47	Esthetic sales consultant	Yes	Divorced
4	Will	30	IT consultant	Yes	Divorced
4	Brittany	29	Strategic HR business partner	Yes	Divorced
5	Derrek	38	Chief automator	Yes	Divorced
5	Meghan	37	Realtor	Yes	Divorced

=== Season 20 ===
The twentieth season featured couples from Seattle and began airing on Peacock on July 12, 2026.

#	Couple	Age	Occupation	Final Decision	Current Status
1	Adam Dehmlow	31	Data Analyst	No	Divorced
1	Marissa Meyer	30	Program Manager	No	Divorced
2	Mecca Amen	28	Sanitation Worker	Yes	Divorced
2	BelléJolie Force	28	Singer/Songwriter, Makeup Artist, Dance Instructor	Yes	Divorced
3	Devin Short	26	Professional Rugby Player	No_{2}	Divorced
3	Caitlin Grimm	27	Social Media Marketer, Makeup Artist, Cycle Instructor	No_{2}	Divorced
4	Cameron Mitchell	37	Head Men's Basketball Coach	Yes	Married
4	Michelle Le	34	Program Manager	Yes	Married
5	Nick Uhlenhuth	31	Product Manager	No_{1}	Divorced
5	Courteney Landis	28	Program Manager, Former Bodybuilder	No_{1}	Divorced
6	Shawn Best	47	College VP of Administration	No	Divorced
6	Nikki Jefferson	46	HR Leader	No	Divorced
7	Felipe Cruz	30	Restaurant Owner	No	Divorced
7	Tori Dahl	32	Senior Marketing Manager	No	Divorced

_{1} Nick and Courtney were the first couple to divorce in the middle of the experiment.
_{2} Devin and Caitlin were the second couple to divorce in the middle of the experiment.

== Timeline of cast ==
Cast	Seasons																					
Cast	1	2	3	4	5	Second Chances	6	7	Honeymoon Island	8	9	10	11	12	13	14	15	16	17	18	19	20
Joseph Cilona	Expert	Expert	Expert																			
Chaplain Greg Epstein	Expert	Expert	Expert																			
Logan Levkoff	Expert	Expert	Expert																			
Pepper Schwartz	Expert	Expert	Expert	Expert	Expert		Expert	Expert		Expert	Expert	Expert	Expert	Expert	Expert	Expert	Expert	Expert	Expert	Expert	Expert	
Rachel DeAlto				Expert	Expert	Expert																
Pastor Calvin Roberson				Expert	Expert	Expert	Expert	Expert	Expert	Expert	Expert	Expert	Expert	Expert	Expert	Expert	Expert	Expert	Expert	Expert	Expert	
Jessica Griffin							Expert	Expert	Expert	Expert												
Viviana Coles											Expert	Expert	Expert	Expert	Expert	Expert						
Pia Holec																	Expert	Expert	Expert	Expert	Expert	
DeVon Franklin																		Expert				
Paul C. Brunson																						Expert
Dr. Lisa Paz																						Expert
Jamie Otis	Contestant		Unfiltered Host		Unfiltered Host		Unfiltered Host	Unfiltered Host		Unfiltered Host	Unfiltered Host	Unfiltered Host	Unfiltered Host	Unfiltered Host	Unfiltered Host	Unfiltered Host						

== Spinoffs ==
Married at First Sight has had eight spinoffs:

- Married at First Sight: The First Year
- Married Life
- Married at First Sight: Second Chances
- Jamie and Doug Plus One
- Married at First Sight: Honeymoon Island
- Married at First Sight: Happily Ever After
- Married at First Sight: Couples' Cam
- Married at First Sight: Unmatchables

=== Married at First Sight: The First Year ===
Married at First Sight: The First Year follows the lives of the two Season 1 couples that remained married from the six-month mark to the one-year anniversary and beyond. The couples are Jamie Otis-Hehner and Doug Hehner, and Cortney Hendrix-Carrion and Jason Carrion. The first episode premiered on January 13, 2015. A total of two seasons have been shown for this spinoff.

=== Married Life ===
Married Life continues to follow the daily lives of two married couples from Season 1, Jamie Otis-Hehner and Doug Hehner and Cortney Hendrix-Carrion and Jason Carrion. The first season premiered May 5, 2015. The second season premiered January 24, 2017.

=== Married at First Sight: Second Chances ===
Two participants from Season 3, Vanessa Nelson and David Norton, both took part in the first season of the second spinoff Married at First Sight: Second Chances. Both David and Vanessa selected from a group of men (for Nelson) and women (for Norton) to date in a format similar to that of The Bachelor or The Bachelorette, ultimately ending with each of them choosing someone to marry. The groups were narrowed down from one hundred (in a speed dating-like situation) to twenty-five, to ten. After Vanessa and David each picked their top ten, they eliminated one person each episode (with the exception of one week's double elimination) until finding 'the one'. The first season premiered on April 27, 2017, and concluded on July 6, 2017, with Vanessa becoming engaged to Andre, although they ultimately ended their relationship, and David choosing to marry no one.

=== Jamie and Doug Plus One ===
Jamie and Doug Plus One continues to follow the lives of Jamie Otis-Hehner and Doug Hehner from the time right before the birth of their daughter Henley, through the first months of new parenthood. The series shows the couple's struggles with caring for their newborn while trying to maintain intimacy in their marriage.

=== Married at First Sight: Honeymoon Island ===
Married at First Sight: Honeymoon Island is an eight-episode series about sixteen singles on an exotic island attempting to match themselves. Casting includes unmatched singles from earlier seasons of the original, fan favorites, and new candidates. Married at First Sight: Honeymoon Island premiered on October 23, 2018, and the participants are:

#	Name	Gender	Age	Occupation	From
1	Brandin Brosh	Female	28	Clothing boutique owner	Biloxi, MS
2	Isabella McKenzie	Female	25	Hostess	Atlanta, GA
3	Jada Rashawn	Female	27	Nanny placement specialist	San Antonio, TX
4	Jocelyn Thompson	Female	30	Business owner	Los Angeles, CA
5	Katie Muller	Female	28	Digital advertising specialist	Denver, CO
6	Kimber Gardner	Female	28	Medical sales representative	Las Vegas, NV
7	Lizzie Muse	Female	30	Kundalini yoga teacher	Boston, MA
8	Mekalya Silvera	Female	32	Hair stylist	Miami, FL
9	Bryan McKay	Male	40	Estimator	Miami, FL
10	Chris Perry	Male	29	Personal trainer and youth counselor	Binghamton, NY
11	Corey Saunders	Male	31	Founder and CEO of BEFIT	Boston, MA
12	Eric Acosta	Male	31	Entrepreneur	Denver, CO
13	Jona Bienko	Male	35	Auto broker	Como, CO
14	Shannon Raddler	Male	33	Pharmaceutical sales representative	Atlanta, GA
15	Travis Dalton	Male	30	Aerospace engineer	Bluffton, SC
16	Tyler Moody	Male	26	Construction company owner	Greeley, CO

At the end of the season, the following participants remain:

#	Couple	Age	Occupation	Final Decision	Status
1	Kimber Gardner	28	Medical sales representative	Yes	Engaged but have since broken up
1	Shannon Raddler	33	Pharmaceutical sales representative	Yes	Engaged but have since broken up
2	Jada Rashawn	27	Nanny placement specialist	Yes	Engaged but have since broken up
2	Chris Perry	29	Personal trainer and youth counselor	Yes	Engaged but have since broken up
3	Brandin Brosh	28	Clothing boutique owner	Yes	Engaged but have since broken up
3	Jona Bienko	35	Auto broker	Yes	Engaged but have since broken up

=== Married at First Sight: Happily Ever After ===
Married at First Sight: Happily Ever After follows the lives of couples from previous seasons who still remain married and are expecting children, including Ashley Petta and Anthony D'Amico from Season 5, Shawniece Jackson and Jephte Pierre from Season 6, and Danielle Bergman and Bobby Dodd from season 7. The first episode premiered on October 30, 2018.

=== Married at First Sight: Couples' Cam ===
Married at First Sight: Couples' Cam premiered on May 20, 2020.

=== Married at First Sight: Unmatchables ===
Married at First Sight: Unmatchables premiered in 2021.
