= Larry Jones (humanist) =

American chemist and humanist

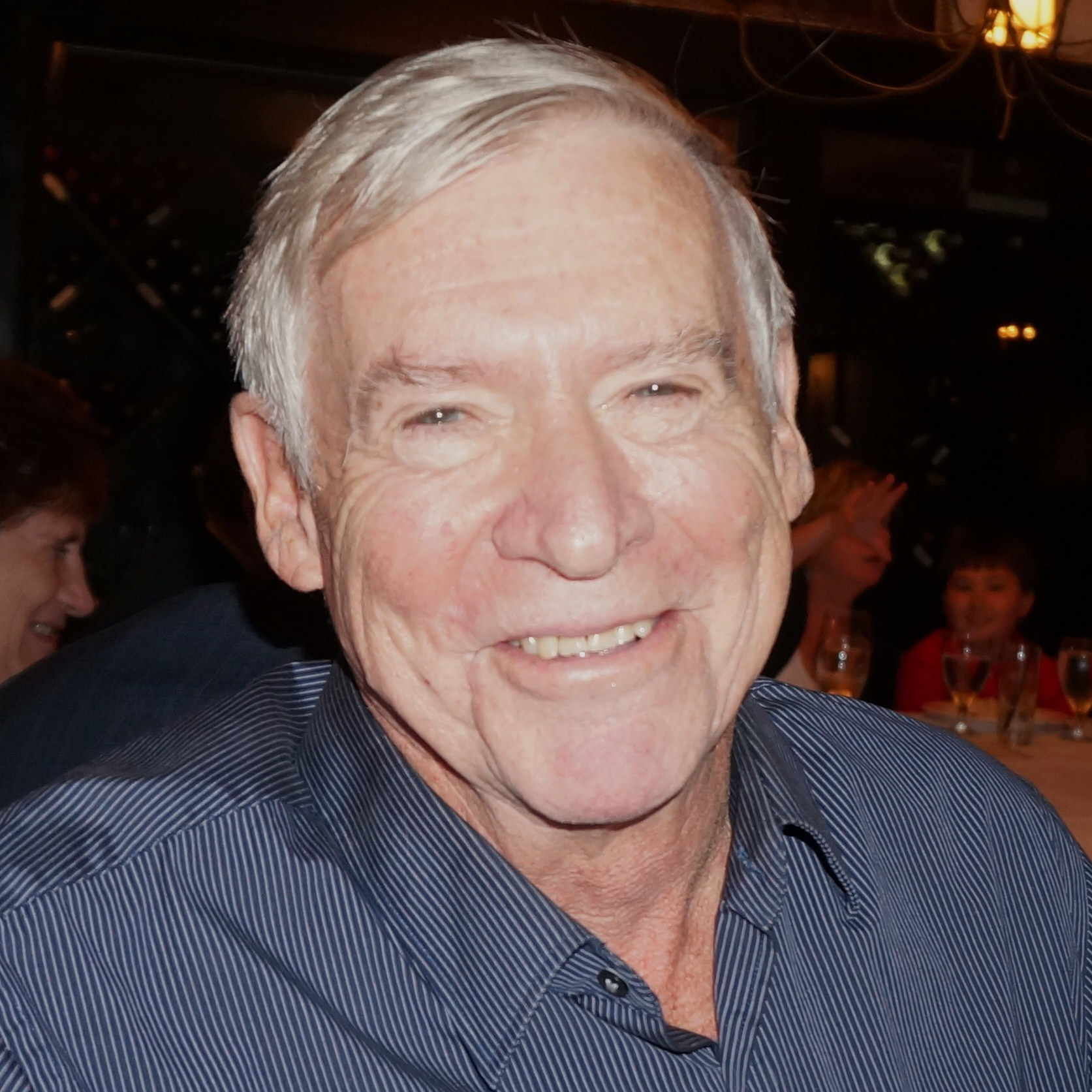
- At Institute for Humanist Studies dinner Aug. 24, 2013
- Known for: Founding the Institute for Humanist Studies

Larry Jones is a retired chemist dedicated to the furthering of humanist thought. He is the founder and former president of the Institute for Humanist Studies, a founder of the Secular Coalition for America, and has been involved in numerous other humanist organizations.

== Biography ==
Jones received his undergraduate degree from Middlebury College and attended graduate school at Villanova University and Rensselaer Polytechnic Institute. For many years Jones worked as a research chemist for the Research and Development division of General Electric.

Although he was born into an atheist family, Jones did not discover humanism until the mid 1980s, when he became involved in the Capital District Humanist Society, a local humanist group in Albany, and the Council for Secular Humanism. Jones later served on the CDHS board and as director from 1998 to 2002. In 1999, Jones founded the Institute for Humanist Studies, a humanist think-tank based in Albany, NY, in order to promote a greater understanding of humanist values. The IHS grant program has also provided hundreds of thousands of dollars in grant funding to humanist projects. Both the Secular Student Alliance and Camp Quest were organizations that benefitted from these grants. August Brunsman, executive director of the Secular Student Alliance, states that Jones was “essentially one of the first donors to significantly support the SSA,” and that the IHS grant was vital to the survival of the organization. Funding from the IHS also helped Camp Quest grow and become more professionalized.

Jones has been a board member of the National Philanthropic Trust, the Committee for the Scientific Investigation of Claims of the Paranormal, Troy Music Hall, National Securities Corporation, and the Center for Inquiry. Prior to the creation of the Secular Coalition for America in late 2002, Jones represented the Institute for Humanist Studies in the Coalition for the Community of Reason.

== Awards and achievements ==
In 2004, the Humanists of Florida Association named Jones “Humanist of the Year.”

After spending several years on its executive committee, in 2006, Jones became the first vice-president of the International Humanist and Ethical Union, the worldwide umbrella group for humanist, atheist, rationalist, freethought, and ethical culture groups. He also represented the IHEU as a non-governmental organization delegate to the United Nations.

In 2006, Jones received the Freethought Backbone Award in recognition of his commitment to the humanist movement and his role as founder and then-president of the Institute for Humanist Studies. The award was given by the Secular Student Alliance at an annual conference hosted by the Secular Student Alliance and Atheist Alliance International.

In August 2013, Jones was honored by the Institute for Humanist Studies for his contributions to humanism.
