= City Congregation for Humanistic Judaism =

Jewish congregation in New York City

- Location in Manhattan

Religion
- Affiliation: Judaism
- Rite: Humanistic
- Ecclesiastical or organisational status: Synagogue
- Leadership: Rabbi Dr. Tzemah Yoreh
- Status: Active

Location
- Location: 15 West 86th Street, Manhattan, New York City, New York
- Country: United States
- Administration: Society for Humanistic Judaism
- Coordinates: 40.7858°N 73.97°W

Architecture
- Established: 1991

Website
- citycongregation.org

The City Congregation for Humanistic Judaism (shortened to The City Congregation or TCC) is a Humanistic Jewish congregation and synagogue meeting on the Upper West Side of Manhattan in New York City, New York, United States. It is the first Humanistic congregation in New York City to be led by a Humanistic rabbi.

== Overview ==
Founded in 1991, the aim of The City Congregation is to provide a welcoming, diverse community for cultural and secular Jews where they can celebrate and preserve their Jewish identity. As adherents of Humanistic Judaism, founded in 1963 by Rabbi Sherwin Wine, TCC members rely on reason, inner strength, and the support of community to face life's challenges and collectively improve the world.

TCC members come from throughout the New York metropolitan area and do not claim one specific neighborhood. While they reside predominantly in Manhattan and Brooklyn, they also live in Queens and the Bronx, as well as Westchester, Long Island and New Jersey. The congregation meets for Shabbats at a convenient Midtown location. The congregation does not have a permanent location. However, for adult and child learning, Shabbats, and High Holidays and Passover, they meet on the Upper West Side in various locations.

The City Congregation is an affiliated community of the Society for Humanistic Judaism, which was organized in 1969 and comprises more than thirty secular Jewish communities in the United States and Canada.

== Celebrations ==
The City Congregation offers cultural High Holiday and Shabbat celebrations throughout the year. A highlight is the congregation's cultural Passover Seder. Based on the idea that Jewish culture has always been changing, the congregation's services adapt old traditions to modern sensibilities and use language that is consistent with humanistic principles.

== KidSchool ==
Twice-monthly KidSchool is designed to foster joy in the children's Jewish education and nurture a cultural connection to their Jewish heritage. The curriculum introduces the students to the principles, beliefs and practices of Humanistic Judaism and develops cultural literacy in Jewish heritage, holidays, literature, and history. In keeping with humanistic values and principles of progressive education, the students are encouraged to develop critical thinking and healthy skepticism in an atmosphere of respectful and open discussion.

== Cultural Bar/Bat Mitzvah ==
A highlight of the program is the Bar Mitzvah or Bat Mitzvah program, for grades six and up, through which children are mentored and guided in the process by adult members of the congregation. The children investigate their family history and values, heroes and role models, their own beliefs, and complete a major project on any topic of Jewish learning they want to explore in depth. A social action component is also included. The Bar/Bat Mitzvah service is filled with readings, songs and a presentation of the work the student has completed throughout the program.

== Other activities ==
The congregation also offers an array of other programs. Social action activities are designed to address contemporary social challenges and increase awareness of these issues. Social outings take advantage of the wonderful cultural offerings in New York City and foster a feeling of community and connection among members.

== Clergy ==
The leader of The City Congregation is Rabbi Dr. Tzemah Yoreh, one the foremost intellectual leaders in Jewish humanism. He has been a student of the Bible since his earliest days, winning the Diaspora Division of the International Bible Contest in childhood. He attended the Hebrew University of Jerusalem, where he obtained his Ph.D. in biblical criticism in record time. He has recently completed a second Ph.D. in Ancient Wisdom Literature at the University of Toronto (thesis: A Compositional History of Ben Sira in the Context of the Transmission of Instruction Literature in the Ancient Mediterranean) for the joy of studying ancient text.

Rabbi Yoreh is a prolific writer and his humanist liturgy has been featured in The Forward in an article entitled “No God, No Problem”. He wrote, in Hebrew, an Atheist-Feminist Siddur. More recently he is the author of the Humanist Prayer Omnibus, which re-imagines prayer as a catalyst for human-driven change rather than communication with a deity. As a writer he is perhaps best known for his theories on why Abraham killed Isaac, featured in The Times of Israel and TheTorah.com.

Rabbi Emeritus Peter Schweitzer was a recognized leader of Humanistic Judaism. He served as the president of the Association of Humanistic Rabbis and was a member of the editorial board of the journal Humanistic Judaism. He also contributed the Humanistic perspective to "Ask the Rabbi" column, published in Moment Magazine. Among his writings are: The Liberated Haggadah: A Passover Celebration for Cultural, Secular and Humanistic Jews (The Center for Cultural Judaism, 2006), The Guide for a Humanistic Bar/Bat Mitzvah (The City Congregation for Humanistic Judaism, 2003), and A Modern Lamentation: A Memorial to 9/11 (The City Congregation for Humanistic Judaism, Rosh Hashanah, 2002).

Rabbi Schweitzer was also recognized for cultivating "the largest private collection of 20th-century Jewish Americana on record", amassed over 25 years. Numbering some 10,000 items, he donated the majority of his collection in 2005 to the Weitzman National Museum of American Jewish History in Philadelphia. Rabbi Schweitzer's dedication to social service and Jewish causes came from a long tradition of family commitment. He was the great-grandson of the constitutional lawyer and Jewish civic leader Louis Marshall, and the grandson of Jacob Billikopf, a nationally recognized leader in social work, Jewish philanthropy and labor negotiation.

Rabbi Schweitzer died on December 20, 2023, after a three-year battle with pancreatic cancer.

== See also ==
- Center for Cultural Judaism
- Secular Jewish culture
