= Lawrence K. Jones =

American psychologist

Lawrence K. Jones is an American counseling psychologist, career assessment developer, and writer of international standing. Jones is a professor Emeritus in the College of Education at North Carolina State University. He received his master's degree from the University of Pennsylvania, and his Ph.D. in counseling psychology at the University of Missouri. His work has been published in more than 50 scientific journals and books. He is the author of the Encyclopedia of Career Change and Work Issues, selected as one of the "Outstanding Reference Sources" by the American Library Association. He received the annual, national Professional Development award of the American Counseling Association and he is a National Certified Counselor.
