= Arthur Dobrin =

Arthur Dobrin (born 1943) is an American author, Professor Emeritus of Management, Entrepreneurship, and General Business at Hofstra University, and Leader Emeritus of the Ethical Humanist Society of Long Island.

Prior to his career, Arthur Dobrin served two years in the Peace Corps with his wife, Lyn, in Kenya. There he was in charge of the educational component of the Kisii District office of the Department of Cooperative Development. He has maintained his interest in Kenya since, having returned with his family and having led educational safaris to Kenya for Adelphi University School of Social Work. He has published two novels, a collection of short stories and a book of poems all set in Kenya. He and Lyn directed the Kenya Project, a program that provided funds for an elementary school in Kisii, from 2000-2010.

== Education ==
Arthur Dobrin graduated attended the City College of New York graduating with a BA in History in 1964, received an MA from NYU in 1974, received a DSW from Adelphi University in 1988, and was a graduate of the Ackerman Family Institute's program in family therapy. He is a member of Phi Alpha Theta (American History Honors Society).

== Career ==
Upon returning home from Africa in 1967, Dobrin joined the Ethical Movement and in 1968 became the Leader of the Ethical Humanist Society of Long Island and served in that position until 2001. Dobrin joined Hofstra University's faculty as an adjunct Associate Professor of Social Sciences in 1989 and taught classes in African literature, social work, moral education, religion and human rights in the New College. He joined the faculty of the School for University Studies as a full-time Professor of Humanities in 1989 and taught in the freshmen program. He retired from full professorship in December 2012. He teaches courses in business ethics in the MBA program in School of Business and journalism ethics in the School of Communication as an adjunct professor.

Dobrin has also been a visiting scholar at Nanjing Normal University, Nanjing, China; Makerere University, Kampala, Uganda; Kisii College, Kisii, Kenya; the Gusii Technical College, Kisii, Kenya; and Claflin University in South Carolina.

Dobrin was the co-founder of Amnesty International USA Group #74, the co-founder of the Long Island Interracial Alliance for a Common Future, and the director of the Encampment for Citizenship in Montana and Arizona. He is also a member of the Nassau County District Attorney's Faith Leaders Advisory Council and the Nassau County Police Commissioner's Community Council. He is a member of the bioethics committee NYU Langone Hospital – Long Island (formerly Winthrop University Hospital) since 1997.

Dobrin currently lives in Westbury, New York with his wife, Lyn. He has three children - Eric, Kori, and Millie - and three grandchildren - MacKenzie, Ryan, and Jordan.

== Author ==
Arthur Dobrin has authored, co-authored and edited more than 20 books, including books in ethics and children's books including Spelling God with Two O's, Ethics for Everyone: How to Improve Your Moral Intelligence, and Business Ethics: The Right Way to Riches. He is also the author of more than 100 poems and articles that have appeared in journals, magazines and newspapers. He is also an expert and has a weekly blog on Psychology today called Am I right which explores thoughts and opinions on how to live an ethical life. Together with his wife Lyn, they also write about honeymoons and romantic travel.

== Awards ==
He is the recipient of Hofstra University's Scholar's Incentive Award, Hofstra University, Allison Kim Levy Continuing Acts of Kindness Memorial Award of the Psychology Department, and the Peter E. Herman Award, for creative work in the literary arts. In 2026, he received the Felix Adler Lifetime Achievement Award from the American Ethical Union Assembly, recognizing individuals whose service has significantly advanced ethical culture and humanism.

== Bibliography ==
- It Never Entered My Mind (Nsemia, 2026)
- One Way or Another: Real Life Ethical Decisions (Ethics International Press, 2025)
- Tell Me Where You've Been (Nsemia, 2024)
- Huellas En El Agua (Traces of Water) (co-author, Servicios Editoriales Generales Blanca S.L., 2023)
- Westbury Imagined (author, Nsemia, 2023)
- Why We Tell Stories (co-author, Nsemia, 2022)
- Spiritual Timber (American Ethical Union, 2020)
- Where We Started (Nsemia, 2020)
- This Red Land (Nsemia, 2018)
- Kwamboka's Inquiry (Nsemia, 2017)
- The Harder Right: Stories of Conscience and Choice (Argo Navis 2013)
- The Lost Art of Happiness (Buffalo NY: Prometheus Press 2011)
- Good for Business: Ethics in the Marketplace (Mumbai: Hindi Granth Karyalay 2006)
- The Lost Art of Happiness ( Mumbai Hindi Granth Karyalay 2006)
- Seeing through Africa (Merrick, NY: Cross-Cultural Communications 2004)
- Religious Ethics: A Sourcebook (Mumbai: Hindi Granth Karyalay 2003)
- Ethics for Everyone: How to Improve Your Moral Intelligence (New York: John Wiley & Sons, 2002)
- Teaching Right from Wrong: 40 Things You Can Do To Raise a Moral Child (Beijing: CITIC Publishing House translated into Chinese 2002)
- Teaching Right from Wrong: 40 Things You Can Do To Raise a Moral Child (New York: Berkeley Publishing Group 2001)
- Tea in a Blue Cup (Merrick, NY: Cross-Cultural Communications 1999)
- Love Your Neighbor: Stories of Values and Virtues (New York: Scholastic, Inc. 1998)
- After Uhuru: Kenya Stories (Merrick, NY: Cross-Cultural Communications 1998)
- Malaika (Nairobi Jomo Kenyatta Foundation 1998)
- Ethical People and How They Get To Be That Way (New York: Ethica Press/Cross-Cultural Communications 1998)
- Spelling God With Two O's (Garden City, NY: Ethical Humanist Society 1993)
- Being Good and Doing Right (Lanham, MD: University Press of America 1993)
- Salted with Fire (Nairobi: Oxford University Press 1990)
- Angles & Chambers (Merrick, NY: Cross-Cultural Communications, 1990)
- Love is Stronger Than Death (Garden City, NY: Fieldston Press 1986)
- Convictions: Political Prisoners - Their Stories, co-author (Maryknoll, NYL Orbis Book 1981)
- Gentle Spears (Merrick, NY: Cross-Cultural Communications 1980)
- Lace: Poetry from the Poor, the Homeless, the Aged, the Physically and Emotionally Disabled (Merrick, NY: Cross-Cultural Communications 1979)
- Saying My Name Out Loud (South Farmingdale, NY: Pleasure Dome Press, 1978)
- The God Within (New York: Ethical Press, 1977)
- Sunbird (Merrick, NY: Cross-Cultural Communications 1976)
- Getting Married the Way You Want, co-author (Englewood Cliffs, NJ: Prentice-Hall 1974)
