= Institute for Humanist Studies =

Think tank supporting humanism

IHS logo.

The Institute for Humanist Studies (IHS) is a think tank based in Washington, DC, USA, that says it is "committed to information and practices meant to address the sociopolitical, economic and cultural challenges facing communities within the United States and within a global context." IHS, consistent with the American Humanist Association and the Humanists International, says that it understands humanism to be “a progressive philosophy of life that, without theism and other supernatural beliefs, affirms our ability and responsibility to lead ethical lives of personal fulfillment that aspire to the greater good of humanity.”

"Happy Human" symbol of the IHS

The IHS was established in 2009 as the successor of the Institute for Humanist Studies, Inc., in Albany, New York. The official symbol of the IHS is the “Happy Human” supporting the world.

== History ==
In June 1999, the Institute for Humanist Studies, Inc., was incorporated in the state of New York. With financial support from Larry Jones, the founding president of the institute, the organization began its work as an educational non-profit institute, with the purpose of providing information to policymakers and others in order to advance humanism as a life philosophy. Much of this information was made available through its online publication – Humanist Network News. In addition to information in the form of papers, etc., the institute also offered distance-learning opportunities through its online “Continuum of Humanist Education” curriculum. With time, these courses were made available without cost to those interested in them. Furthermore, through its registered lobbyist, the Institute sought to promote humanism within New York State Legislation. Intentionally avoiding a framework based on membership, the Institute understood itself as thereby being free to partner with other humanist organizations without competition for members. Based on this approach, the Institute became a founding member of the Secular Coalition for America. In addition to supporting these organizations through information, the institute also provided grants averaging between $10,000-$20,000 to humanist organizations in support of the policy efforts and programming. Those receiving grants include: Secular Student Alliance; International Humanist and Ethical Youth Organization (Belgium); Prometheus Society of Slovakia, Bratislava; and the International Humanist and Ethical Union (London).

In 2008, the Institute for Humanist Studies, Inc., began conversations with the American Humanist Association (AHA) with the purpose being a partnership with the AHA. In 2009, the conversations shifted to the possibility of the AHA taking over the operations of the institute with the exception of its lobbying efforts. It was eventually decided in 2009 that the Institute should be reconstituted along the lines of a formal think tank, with another organization (The Humanist Institute) taking over its online classes. It was argued a formal think tank would be positioned to provide the humanist movement with information and other modes of assistance with the promotion of humanism in the United States and elsewhere.

A meeting was held in Arizona in 2009 to map out the reconstituted Institute for Humanist Studies. Shortly after that meeting, a board of directors was constituted, and Anthony Pinn was asked to serve as Director of Research. The first Managing Director was Mercedes Diane Griffin Forbes, who served in that capacity during the first year of the institute. The vision statement for the new Institute was drafted and approved by the Board in November 2010. This document outlined the structure and purpose of the organization.

== Staff ==
- Anthony B. Pinn, Director of Research

== See also ==
- The Humanist Institute
