= Birmingham Temple =

Humanistic Jewish synagogue in Detroit, Michigan, United States

- Location in Michigan

Religion
- Affiliation: Judaism
- Rite: Humanistic
- Ecclesiastical or organisational status: Synagogue
- Leadership: Rabbi Jeffrey L. Falick
- Status: Active

Location
- Location: 28611 West Twelve Mile Road, Farmington Hills, a suburb of Detroit, Michigan
- Country: United States
- Administration: Society for Humanistic Judaism
- Coordinates: 42°29′57″N 83°19′49″W

Architecture
- Founder: Rabbi Sherwin Wine
- Established: 1963 (as a congregation)
- Completed: 1971

Website
- chj-detroit.org

The Birmingham Temple, officially the Congregation for Humanistic Judaism of Metro Detroit, is a Humanistic Jewish congregation and synagogue, located at 28611 West Twelve Mile Road, Farmington Hills, a suburb of Detroit, Michigan, in the United States. The synagogue was founded in 1963 as the Birmingham Temple in Birmingham, a suburb of Detroit.

== History ==
The Congregation for Humanistic Judaism of Metro Detroit was founded in 1963 by Rabbi Sherwin Wine (formerly an assistant rabbi at Temple Beth El) and eight founding families, who originally intended that the congregation would be located in Birmingham. The temple originally followed many Reform practices but within six months decided to drop most of these (as well as all mentions of God in the services), and began to pursue a humanist philosophy.

The congregation's first services were at Eagle Elementary School, and then at Highmeadow School, in Farmington; later services moved to the Masonic Temple, Birmingham Unitarian Church, and from 1965 to 1971 were held at Frost Middle School in Livonia. Finally, in 1971, the temple moved to its current location on Twelve Mile Road in Farmington Hills. The temple began publishing the journal Humanistic Judaism in 1967. According to Sydney Bolkosky, the temple "sought to define a primarily secular Jewish identity" and "steered a clearly liberal political and humanistic moral course."

In 2003, Tamara Kolton was appointed as senior rabbi of the congregation. Sherwin Wine died in an automobile accident in 2007. In 2013, Jeffrey Falick became the new rabbi of the congregation.
