= Sherwin Wine =

American rabbi (1928–2007)

- Born: January 25, 1928; Detroit, Michigan, U.S.
- Died: July 21, 2007 (aged 79); Essaouira, Morocco
- Occupation: Rabbi
- Years active: 1951–2007

Sherwin Theodore Wine (Hebrew name שמעון בן צבי, Shimon ben Tzvi; January 25, 1928 – July 21, 2007) was an American rabbi and a founding figure of Humanistic Judaism, a movement that emphasizes Jewish culture and history as sources of Jewish identity rather than belief in any gods. He was originally ordained as a Reform rabbi but later founded the Birmingham Temple, the first congregation of Humanistic Judaism, in 1963.

In 1969, Wine founded the Society for Humanistic Judaism (SHJ). He was later a founder of several other Humanistic Jewish organizations, and was the founder of several humanist organizations that are not specifically Jewish (such as the Humanist Institute and the International Association of Humanist Educators, Counselors, and Leaders) as well as the co-founder of Americans for Religious Liberty, which promotes separation of church and state. He was the provost of the International Institute for Secular Humanistic Judaism at the time of his death.

Wine lectured on a wide array of topics after 1976 under the auspices of the Center for New Thinking, which he also founded. The American Humanist Association awarded him the Humanist Pioneer Award in 1991 and named him Humanist of the Year for 2003.

== Early life ==
Wine was born in Detroit on January 25, 1928, the son of immigrant parents from Poland. His father, whose name was originally Herschel Wengrowski, joined family members in Detroit in 1906. His mother, Tieblei Israelski, emigrated to Detroit in 1914. Wine attended Detroit public schools with almost completely Jewish student bodies, and his religious upbringing was in Conservative Judaism at Congregation Shaarey Zedek. His parents kept a kosher home and observed Shabbat. Wine attended the University of Michigan, earning a BA and later an MA in philosophy. As an undergraduate student, he was most sympathetic to empiricism, particularly its then-current manifestation logical positivism. At the same time, he was attracted to the humanistic outlook of some faculty members.

== Career ==
Despite his movement away from theism, Wine decided to join the clergy rather than academia and in 1951 enrolled in the rabbinic program at Reform Judaism's Hebrew Union College. Wine served in the U.S. Army, becoming a First Lieutenant and later volunteering as a chaplain, after his ordination as a rabbi and served as associate rabbi at the Reform Temple Beth El in Detroit for six months while awaiting induction. Wine began his service as an Army chaplain in January 1957 and was stationed in Korea. In November 1958, he returned to Temple Beth El in Detroit. In the fall of 1959, he joined a group in Windsor, Ontario, just across the Detroit River in Canada to organize a new Reform congregation, also called Beth El.

In 1963, a disaffected group from Temple Beth El in Detroit contacted Wine and asked him to meet with them about forming a new Reform congregation in the northwestern suburbs of Detroit, where the members now lived. He began leading services for the new group, initially eight families, in September 1963, in Farmington Hills, Michigan. Working with members of this small group to develop language which reflected their true beliefs, Wine eventually made the decision to eliminate the word "God" from the services and instead to use new liturgy that extolled Jewish history, culture, and ethical values. This decision was to lay the foundation for the development of Humanistic Judaism as separate from Reform Judaism or any other existing Jewish stream.

A storm of controversy arose when it became known that Wine, who had by then left Temple Beth El in Windsor, was leading a congregation that did not recognize God. The Detroit Free Press ran an article in December 1964 with the headline "Suburban Rabbi: 'I Am an Atheist.'" This was followed by stories in Time magazine and the New York Times. Wine explained that his views were not precisely atheistic. Rather, reflecting his acceptance of the basic outlook of the logical positivists, he declared that it was not possible empirically to prove or disprove the existence of God and, therefore, the concept was meaningless. He referred to this stance as "ignosticism" rather than atheism or agnosticism.

The Masonic Temple in Birmingham in which the congregation was meeting at the time expelled the group early in 1965 because it had rejected God. The congregation, now known as the Birmingham Temple, purchased land in Farmington Hills, Michigan, and moved into a newly constructed building in 1971. The Torah scroll was placed in the library rather than at the usual place in the sanctuary. Instead, the sanctuary was adorned with a large sculpture spelling out in Hebrew the word Adam, meaning "man" or "people."

Wine served as the rabbi of the Birmingham Temple until his retirement in 2003, at which time he began devoting most of his efforts to his work as Dean for North America and Provost of the International Institute for Secular Humanistic Judaism as well as to lecturing on a wide range of topics under the auspices of the Center for New Thinking, which he had founded in 1976. In 2003 he was one of the signers of the Humanist Manifesto.

Wine's last work, A Provocative People: The Secular History of the Jews, was published after his death. It was edited by his student Rabbi Adam Chalom.

As the outlook and practices of the Birmingham Temple attracted people in other locations, Wine assumed the responsibility for founding several organizations designed to link these adherents together.

First, in 1969, the Society for Humanistic Judaism was formed by Wine's Birmingham Temple; a previously Reform congregation in Illinois headed by Rabbi Daniel Friedman, who had led the congregation from Reform to Humanistic Judaism after learning about Wine's work in Michigan; and a congregation in Westport, Connecticut, which had been organized by a member of the Birmingham Temple who had moved to Connecticut. The Society for Humanistic Judaism now has over 30 constituent congregations in the United States and Canada, as well as individual members unaffiliated with any of these congregations.

To fulfill the need of the Humanistic Judaism movement for trained leaders, Wine founded the International Institute for Secular Humanistic Judaism in 1985. This educational institution was sponsored jointly by the Society for Humanistic Judaism and the Congress of Secular Jewish Organizations. The rabbinic program of this Institute has educated and ordained seven rabbis in North America in addition to over 50 leaders (called madrikhim or madrikhot in Hebrew or vegvayzer in Yiddish) who have less training than rabbis but are certified by the institute to officiate at weddings and other life cycle events. The institute also has an active rabbinical program in Israel from which eight rabbis have graduated and been ordained.

Wine also founded several organizations that are not specifically Jewish. In 1981, he and others created the Voice of Reason for the purpose of responding to the upsurge of right-wing political activism by religious leaders such as Rev. Jerry Falwell. In 1982, The Voice of Reason merged with the Center for Moral Democracy, which had been started by Ethical Culture leader Edward L. Ericson and others, to form a new organization, Americans for Religious Liberty, which continues as an advocacy group for the separation of church and state.

In 1982, Wine founded the North American Committee for Humanism, a confederation of the six major humanist organizations in North America, and The Humanist Institute, a graduate school in New York for training humanist leaders. Wine served as President of both of these organizations from 1982 until 1993.

In the Detroit area, Wine founded the Conference on Liberal Religion, an association of liberal religious professionals, in 1985 and an advocacy group called Clergy and Citizens United in 1995.

Wine retired in 2003.

== Views ==
While secular Jewish culture thrived in the United States in the first half of the 20th century, its principal manifestations, Yiddish-based schools and Zionism, were in decline by the beginning of the 1960s. Many nonreligious Jews were becoming unaffiliated with either religious or secular Jewish organizations. Recognizing that most Americans are members of thriving religious congregations, Wine concluded that a congregational format, emphasizing Jewish culture and history rather than a theistic outlook, could attract nonreligious Jews who were not served by other Jewish organizations. The goal was to provide members with a sense of community and all of the services that are provided by congregational life, but in a manner consistent with the nontheistic outlook of Wine and the others in his movement.

Wine emphasized intellectual integrity, keeping words consistent with beliefs. For him and his congregants, this meant that references to a deity had to be excluded from the liturgy. As a result, Wine discarded virtually all previous Jewish liturgical writings. A typical passage developed by Wine for the Sabbath (Shabbat) is, in transliterated Hebrew and in English:

Na-eh ha-or ba-olam.
Na-eh ha-or ba-shalom.
Na-eh ha-or ba-shabbat.

How wonderful is the light of the world.
How radiant are the candles of peace.
How beautiful are the lights of Shabbat.

Wine composed a poem that is considered to be the central expression of the outlook of Humanistic Judaism:

איפה אורי? אורי בי.
איפה תקותי? תקותי בי.
איפה כחי? כחי בי וגם בך.

Ayfo oree? Oree bee.
Ayfo tikvatee? Tikvatee bee.
Ayfo kokhee? Kokhee bee - v'gam bakh.

Where is my light? My light is in me.
Where is my hope? My hope is in me.
Where is my strength? My strength is in me – and in you.

Many of the Jewish holidays have been maintained within Wine's Humanistic Judaism, but the interpretations of the meanings of these holidays has been amended for consistency with the outlook of this movement. For example, Rosh Hashanah is said, within Humanistic Judaism, to be a time for renewal and reflection, focusing on the affirmation of human power and human dignity. Yom Kippur is, according to Wine and his movement, a celebration of inner strength and a time of self-forgiveness. Prayers and references to God are excluded from the services even for these holidays.

The Torah and other traditional Jewish religious texts are, for Wine, important historical documents that need to be evaluated scientifically to determine their origins and degree of factuality. For him, writings of the Jews of the past 250 years have more philosophical and ethical validity than ancient writings because they are more likely to be infused with the values of the Haskalah, the Jewish Enlightenment, and the more general Western Enlightenment.

Unlike other streams of Judaism, Humanistic Judaism does not condemn or discourage intermarriage, and its clergy are happy to officiate at weddings between Jews and non-Jews. Wine's view has been that criticizing people for marrying whomever they choose is not only unethical but also counterproductive to efforts to ensure Jewish continuity. For Wine and Humanistic Judaism, Jewish identity is largely a matter of self-identification.

Wine has been closely affiliated with the non-Jewish Humanist movement. In responding to questions as to why a specifically Jewish organization should exist within Humanism, he has said that the history of the Jews is a clear demonstration that only people can solve human problems of survival and that there is no supernatural force that will come to our aid.

Wine has written numerous books and articles. His Judaism Beyond God is a description of the history and outlook of the Humanistic Judaism movement. Celebrations: A Ceremonial and Philosophic Guide for Humanists and Humanistic Jews is, as its name indicates, a compendium of Wine's liturgical writings and "meditations," intended for use at various holiday and life cycle ceremonies. Staying Sane in a Crazy World is a general self-help book, with advice on how reliance on reason can help us live meaningful and fulfilling lives.

Wine coined the word ignosticism. It is the view that a coherent definition of God must be presented before the question of the existence of God can be meaningfully discussed.

An openly gay man, Wine was also a member of Triangle Foundation's Board of Advisors.

Wine supported the Zionist movement and Jewish peoplehood, writing that "Zionism is the most effective expression, in modern times, that we Jews are more than a religion. We are a people and an ethnic culture."

== Works ==
- Judaism Beyond God (1985, 2017)
- A Provocative People: A Secular History of the Jews (2012)
- A Life of Courage: Sherwin Wine and Humanistic Judaism (2003)
- Staying Sane in a Crazy World (1995)
- Celebration: A Ceremonial and Philosophic Guide for Humanists and Humanistic Jews (1988)
- High Holidays for Humanists (1979)
- Humanistic Judaism (1978)
- The Humanist Haggadah (1976)
- Meditation Services for Humanistic Judaism (1976)

== Death ==
On July 21, 2007, Wine and his partner of more than 25 years Richard McMains were in a taxi headed to a hotel after dinner in Essaouira, Morocco, when their taxi was hit by another vehicle. Wine, aged 79, and the taxi driver were both killed instantly; McMains survived with serious injuries. A memorial service was held for Wine at a Presbyterian church.

== See also ==
- History of the Jews in Metro Detroit
- Humanistic Judaism
- International Institute for Secular Humanistic Judaism
- Society for Humanistic Judaism
- The City Congregation
