= International Institute for Secular Humanistic Judaism =

The International Institute for Secular Humanistic Judaism (IISHJ) is the academic and intellectual center of Humanistic Judaism. It was established in Jerusalem in 1985, with its second center of activity based in Farmington Hills, Michigan. The Institute offers professional training programs for spokespersons, educators, leaders (also referred to in Hebrew as madrikhim/ot or in Yiddish as vegvayzer), and rabbis, in addition to publications, public seminars, and colloquia for lay audiences. It has also trained music leaders and cantors, though those programs are not currently active.

The Institute began offering its Leadership Program in 1986 as a joint program serving the communities of the Congress of Secular Jewish Organizations and the Society for Humanistic Judaism. It began a rabbinic program in 1992, and its first rabbinic ordination in North America took place in 1999; subsequent ordinations have happened biennially. The Israeli rabbinic program of the IISHJ began in 2004 and held its first ordination in 2006. The IISHJ's founding co-chairs were Rabbi Sherwin Wine and Yaakov Malkin of Tel Aviv University. Wine led the IISHJ in North America until his death in July 2007. The current dean for North America is Rabbi Adam Chalom, while the dean for Israel is Rabbi Sivan Malkin Maas.
