= Society for Humanistic Judaism =

Secular Jewish organization

- The Humanorah, the SHJ's primary symbol
- Founded: 1969; 57 years ago
- Founder: Rabbi Sherwin Wine
- Type: 501(c)(3)
- Tax ID no.: 38-2221910
- Headquarters: Farmington Hills, Michigan, U.S.
- Executive Director: Paul Golin (2014)
- President: Mary Raskin
- Revenue: $333,193 (2014)
- Expenses: $364,025 (2014)
- Endowment: $681,129
- Staff: 4 (2013)
- Volunteers: 35 (2013)
- Website: shj.org

The Society for Humanistic Judaism (SHJ), founded by Rabbi Sherwin Wine in 1969, is an American 501(c)(3) organization and the central body of Humanistic Judaism in North America, a philosophy that combines a non-theistic and humanistic outlook with the celebration of Jewish culture and identity while adhering to secular values and ideas.

The SHJ assists in organizing new communities, supporting its members, and providing a voice for Humanistic Jews. It gathers and creates educational and programmatic materials for topics including holidays and rites of passage, and sponsors training programs and conferences for its members. The Humanistic Youth Group ("HuJews") subdivision offers programs for teens and young adults, including an annual conclave. The SHJ publishes a monthly online newsletter and a biannual topical journal and member newsletter.

The Society participates in both the Jewish and non-religious worlds as a Hillel International partner, a participant in the General Assembly of the Jewish Federations of North America, and a member of the Secular Coalition for America. Miriam Jerris is the current rabbi of the SHJ.

== Humanorah ==
The Humanorah is the primary symbol of Humanistic Judaism used by the SHJ, intended as a non-theistic alternative to other Jewish symbols such as the Star of David or the tablets of the Ten Commandments. It was developed and trademarked by the SHJ and has been its logo since the early 1980s. Its name is a portmanteau of "human" and "menorah", representing the convergence of humanism with Jewish identity. The symbol itself is a combination of these two elements; a human figure stands with its arms raised, while two other branches cross over its torso to form a total of six arms, with stylized flames emerging from all six arms.

== Congregations ==
In 1994, the SHJ had 10,000 members across 30 congregations in the United States and Canada. Current notable congregations include Or Emet in Minneapolis, the City Congregation for Humanistic Judaism in New York City, Kahal B'raira in Boston, Oraynu Congregation for Humanistic Judaism in Toronto, Kol Shalom in Portland, and Machar in Washington, D.C. There are also several congregations around the world, such as in the UK and Australia, though not all Humanistic Judaism congregations are affiliated with the SHJ.

== Views ==
Humanistic Judaism is noted for its highly egalitarian approach to issues such as gender and gender identification, Jewish status, sexual orientation, and other social issues.

=== Jewish traditions ===
Within Humanistic Judaism, Jewish identity is largely a matter of self-identification. A statement on the website Humanistic Rabbis says that Humanistic Jews believe "[that] Jewish identity is primarily a cultural and ethnic identity, [that] belief systems are too diverse among Jews to serve as criteria for membership, [that] joining the Jewish community is a process of cultural identification, [and that] a person who seeks to embrace Jewish identity should be encouraged to do so and should be assisted in this endeavor".

Both Jews and non-Jews, as well as members of the LGBTQIA community, are able to participate in all Humanistic Jewish rituals and undertake leadership roles in any capacity.

Humanistic Jewish rabbis and other leaders officiate at marriages between Jews and non-Jews and (unlike Conservative and Orthodox Jews) do not take any position on interfaith marriage, stating, "Intermarriage is an American Jewish reality—a natural consequence of a liberal society in which individuals have the freedom to marry whomever they wish... that intermarriage is neither good nor bad, just as we believe that the marriage of two Jews, in itself, is neither good nor bad. The moral worth of a marriage always depends on the quality of the human relationship—on the degree of mutual love and respect that prevails." Secular humanistic rabbis and leaders can also co-officiate at these marriages. These views on Jewish identity and intermarriage are criticized by those who believe that they will hasten the assimilation of Jews into general society and thus adversely affect Jewish continuity.

The traditional Jewish infant circumcision brit milah is not performed in Humanistic Judaism, instead being replaced by the more modern baby-naming ceremony brit shalom.

Humanistic Judaism ordains both men and women as rabbis, and its first female rabbi Tamara Kolton was ordained in 1999. Its first cantor was also a woman, Deborah Davis, who was ordained in 2001. Humanistic Judaism has since stopped ordaining cantors, but does today ordain lifecycle officiants and has a broader program of training Jewish leaders.

=== Abortion ===
Humanistic Judaism takes a pro-choice stance on the issue of abortion. A statement issued by the SHJ in 1996 said, "We affirm that a woman has the moral right and should have the continuing legal right to decide whether or not to terminate a pregnancy in accordance with her own ethical standards. Because a decision to terminate a pregnancy carries serious, irreversible consequences, it is one to be made with great care and with keen awareness of the complex psychological, emotional, and ethical implications." The SHJ issued a statement in 2011 condemning the passage of the No Taxpayer Funding for Abortion Act, calling it a "direct attack on a woman's right to choose."

=== LGBT+ rights ===
In 2004, the SHJ issued a resolution supporting the legal recognition of both same-sex marriage and same-sex divorce, affirming its belief in "the value of marriage between any two committed adults with the sense of obligations, responsibilities, and consequences thereof." In 2010, the SHJ pledged to speak out against homophobia.

=== Religious exemptions ===
In 2012, the SHJ issued a statement opposing conscience clauses that allow religious-affiliated institutions to be exempt from providing reproductive healthcare services to individuals or their employees. It said, "We rely upon evidence-based medicine to promote responsible reproductive healthcare policies. [...] We believe that healthcare institutions (defined as including but not limited to insurers, managed-care providers, hospitals, pharmacies) should not be able to use religion as a way to deny legitimate and lawful reproductive healthcare and accurate medical information concerning reproductive healthcare to patients who do not share the same religious or moral beliefs."

=== Women's equality ===
In 2013, the SHJ issued a statement to say it "wholeheartedly supports the observance of Women's Equality Day on August 26 to commemorate the anniversary of the passage of the Nineteenth Amendment to the U.S. Constitution allowing women to vote." It also said that it "condemns gender discrimination in all its forms, including restriction of rights, limited access to education, violence, and subjugation," and commits itself to "maintain vigilance and speak out in the fight to bring gender equality to our generation and to the generations that follow."

=== Drug use ===
In 2021, the SHJ issued a statement calling for the complete decriminalization of cannabis for both medical and recreational purposes.

== See also ==
- Humanistic Judaism
- Religious humanism
