= Religion in Australia =

Religion in Australia (2021 census)
1. No religion (38.9%)
2. Not stated (7.20%)
3. Catholicism (20.0%)
4. Protestantism (17.6%)
5. Eastern Orthodoxy (2.10%)
6. Restorationism (0.50%)
7. Other Christians (3.70%)
8. Islam (3.20%)
9. Hinduism (2.70%)
10. Buddhism (2.40%)
11. Sikhism (0.80%)
12. Judaism (0.40%)
13. Other religions (0.50%)

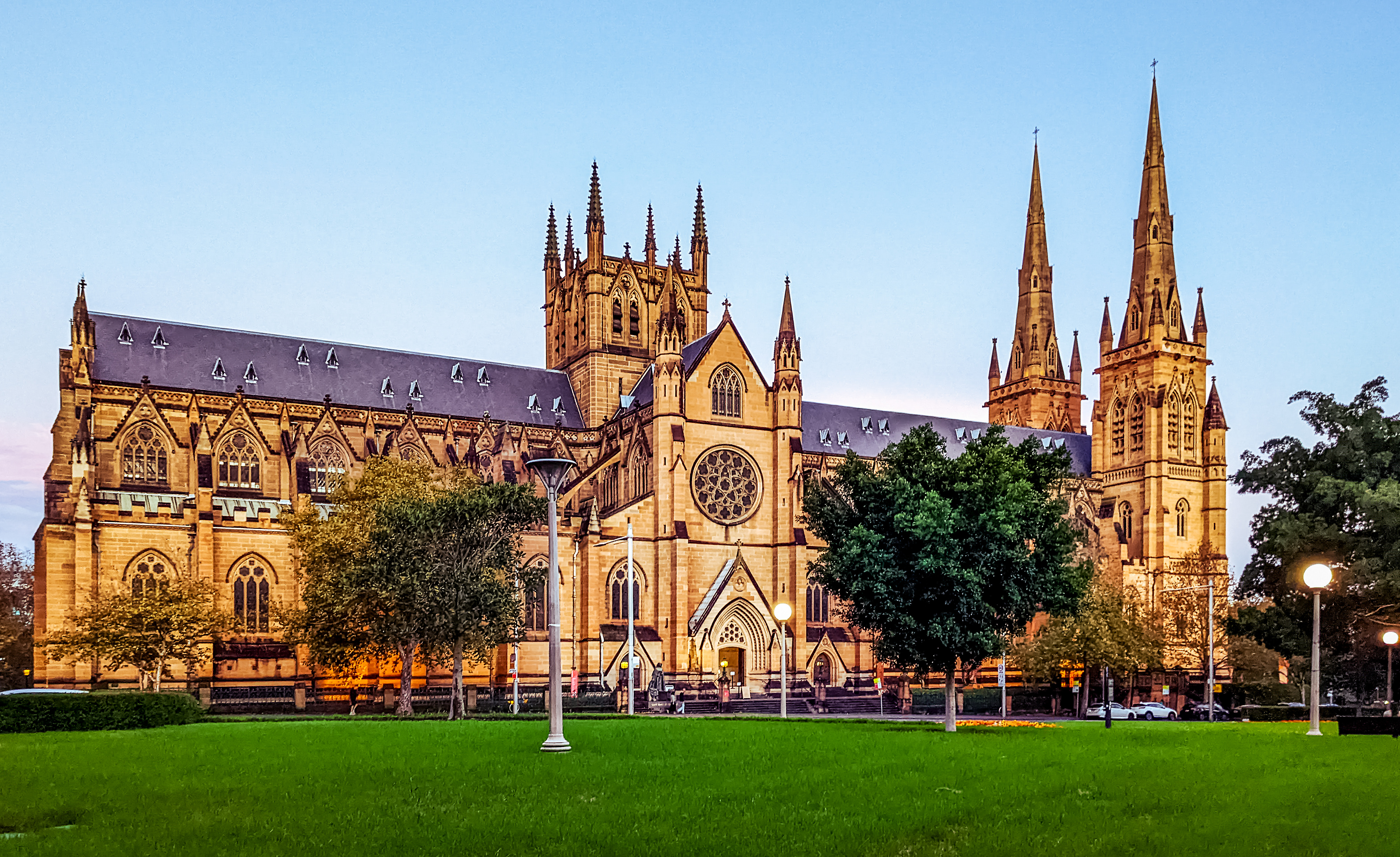
St Mary's Cathedral in Sydney.

Religion in Australia is diverse. In the 2021 national census, 43.9% of Australians identified with Christianity and 38.9% declared "no religion".

Australia has no official religion. Section 116 of the Constitution of Australia states: "The Commonwealth shall not make any law for establishing any religion, or for imposing any religious observance, or for prohibiting the free exercise of any religion, and no religious test shall be required as a qualification for any office or public trust under the Commonwealth."

Section 116 does not preclude the states of Australia from making such laws.

The Christian holy days of Easter and Christmas are public holidays.

== History ==
The Aboriginal peoples of Australia traditionally followed a set of beliefs known as The Dreaming; some of the earliest evidence for religious practices among humans has been found in the archaeological record of their ancestors. Torres Strait Islander religion bore similarities to broader Melanesian spirituality.

Christianity came to Australia in 1788 with British colonial settlement. Of the convicts and free settlers, most were members of the established Church of England with lesser numbers of Nonconformist Protestants, Catholics and other faiths. The first religious census in 1828 divided the early colony into four groups: Protestants, Catholics, Jews and Pagans.

Other smaller groups also arrived and established their churches. Jews started arriving in the early 19th century. The Australian gold rushes brought in workers from China and the Pacific islands, as well as specialised workers from British India, such as the mainly Muslim "Afghan Cameleers".

=== Indigenous Australian religion ===
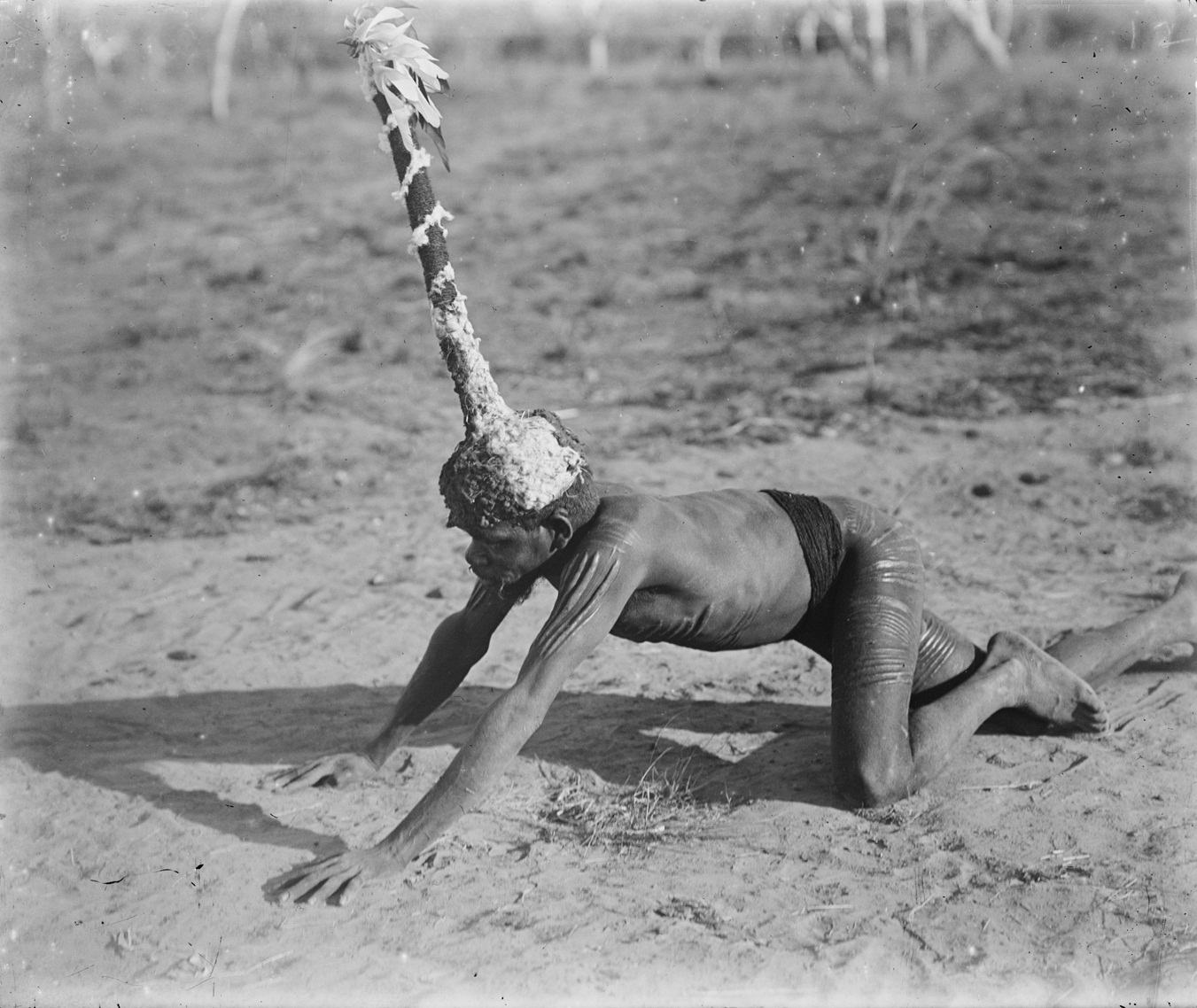
Kolaia man wearing a headdress worn in a fire ceremony, Forrest River, Western Australia

Dreaming (spirituality) has been practised for tens of thousands of years. It is at once a collection of stories of an ancient view of creation and present day spirituality. It places significant emphasis on belonging to the land. It shaped and continues to shape Aboriginal law and customs; and Aboriginal art, story and dance continue to draw on these spiritual traditions.

There is evidence of contact between indigenous Australians with colonisers, fishermen, and survivors of numerous shipwrecks from peoples of various non-Indigenous cultures and faiths prior to British colonisation. Indigenous Australians of (Arnhem Land) (in Northern Australia) retain stories, songs and paintings of trade and cultural interaction with sea-faring peoples from the north, generally regarded as being from the east Indonesian archipelago. There is some evidence of Islamic terms and concepts entering northern Aboriginal cultures via these interactions. (See: Macassan contact with Australia.)

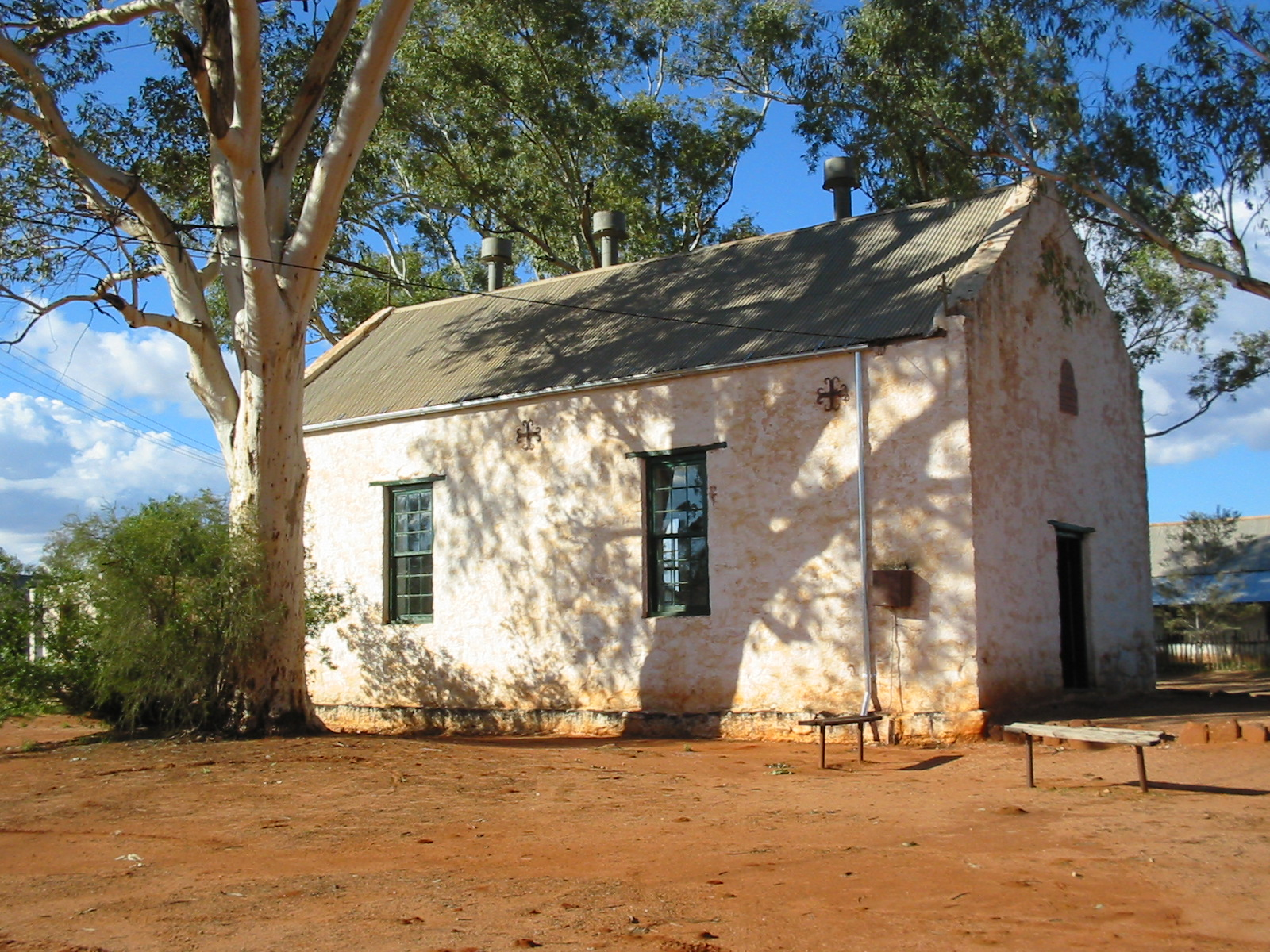
Hermannsburg Aboriginal Mission, Northern Territory

=== Christianity ===
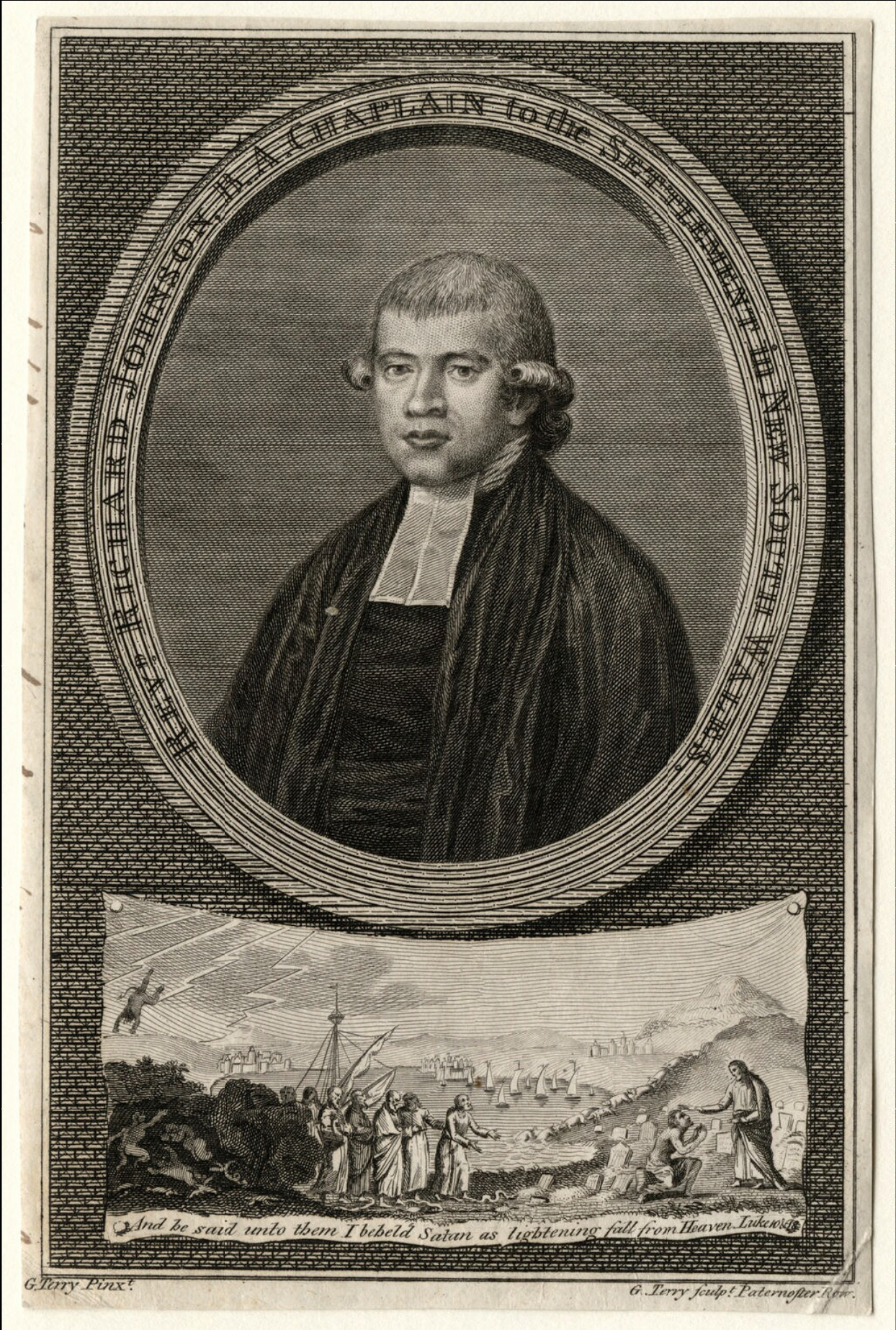
Richard Johnson, the chaplain of the First Fleet

While the Church of England originally held a position of privilege in early colonial Australia, a legal framework guaranteeing religious equality evolved within a few decades, especially when the Church of England was disestablished in the colony of New South Wales by the Church Act 1836. Drafted by the reformist attorney-general John Plunkett, the act established legal equality for Anglicans, Catholics and Presbyterians, and was later extended to Methodists. British Nonconformist Methodist, Presbyterians, Congregationalists and Baptists set up their own churches in the 19th century, as did Lutherans from Germany.

Large numbers of Irish Catholics were transported to Australia between the late 18th and 19th centuries. Sectarian tensions in Australia, largely fuelled by historical grievances between Catholics and other Christians, continued into the 20th century. The gold rush of the 1850s led to significantly increased immigration and diversity of religious traditions, such as Irish Catholicism, Scottish Presbyterianism and English Anglicanism among other religious traditions.

Australian Aboriginal peoples suffered a decline during this period as they were dispossessed of their lands; and diseases spread among their populations. Christian churches and religious individuals organised missions during this period, intended to "protect" and "civilise" Aboriginal communities and spread Christianity. Protection policies reached as far as the islands of the Torres Strait with the creation of "reserves". The overall consequences of this activity contributed to the decline of indigenous languages and beliefs, the extent to which are still being determined and recorded.

By 1901, apart from the indigenous population and descendants of gold rush migrants, Australian society was predominantly Anglo-Celtic, with 40% of the population being Anglican, 23% Catholic, 34% other Christian and about 1% professing non-Christian religions. From the 1950s onwards, the country experienced a rapid growth in the number of Catholics due to the influx of many post-war immigrants from continental Europe and Malta. Freedom of religion was enshrined in Section 116 of the Constitution of Australia of 1901.

=== Other religions ===
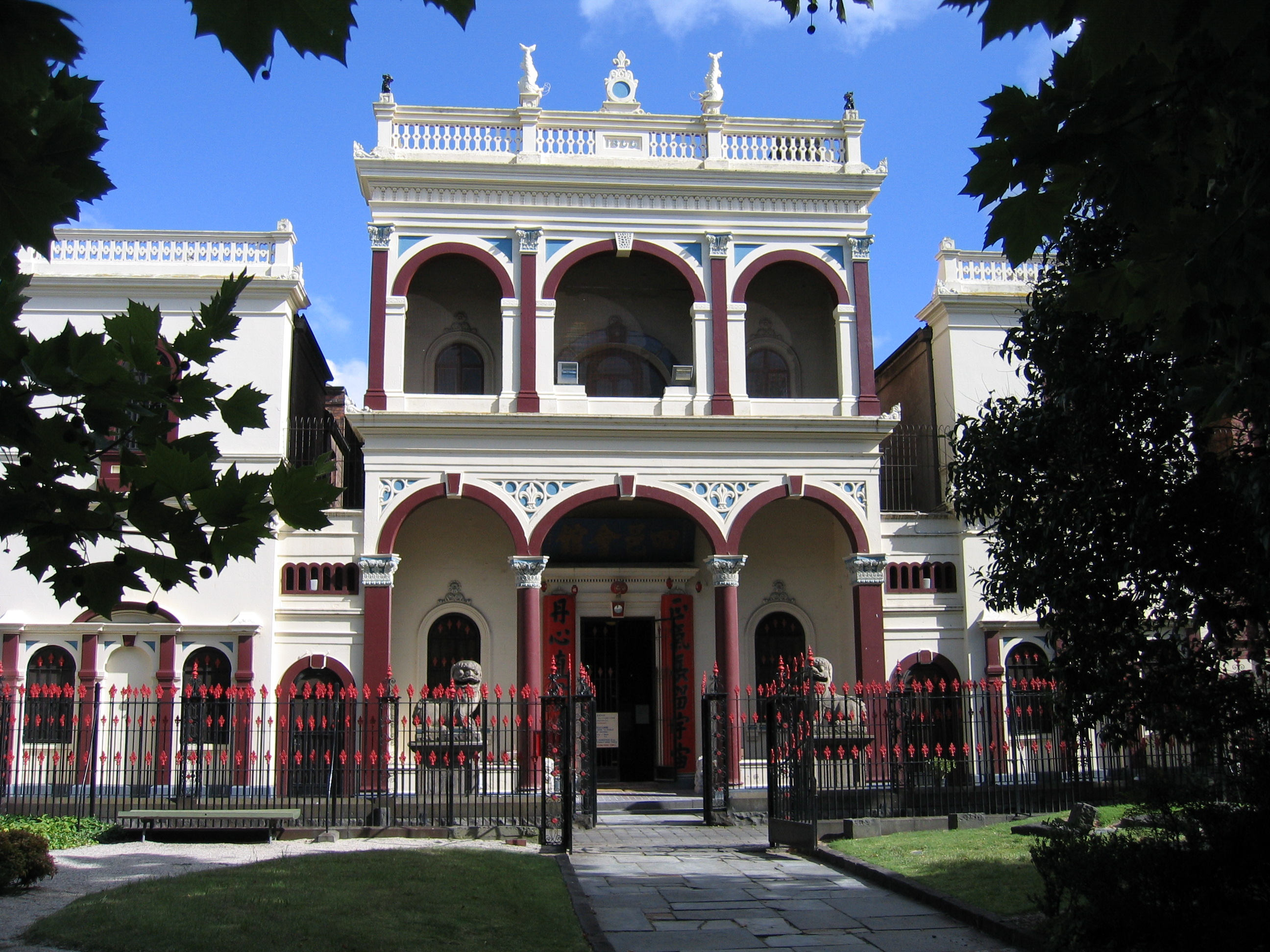
Siyi Guandi Temple in Melbourne, the oldest temple of the Chinese folk religion in Australia

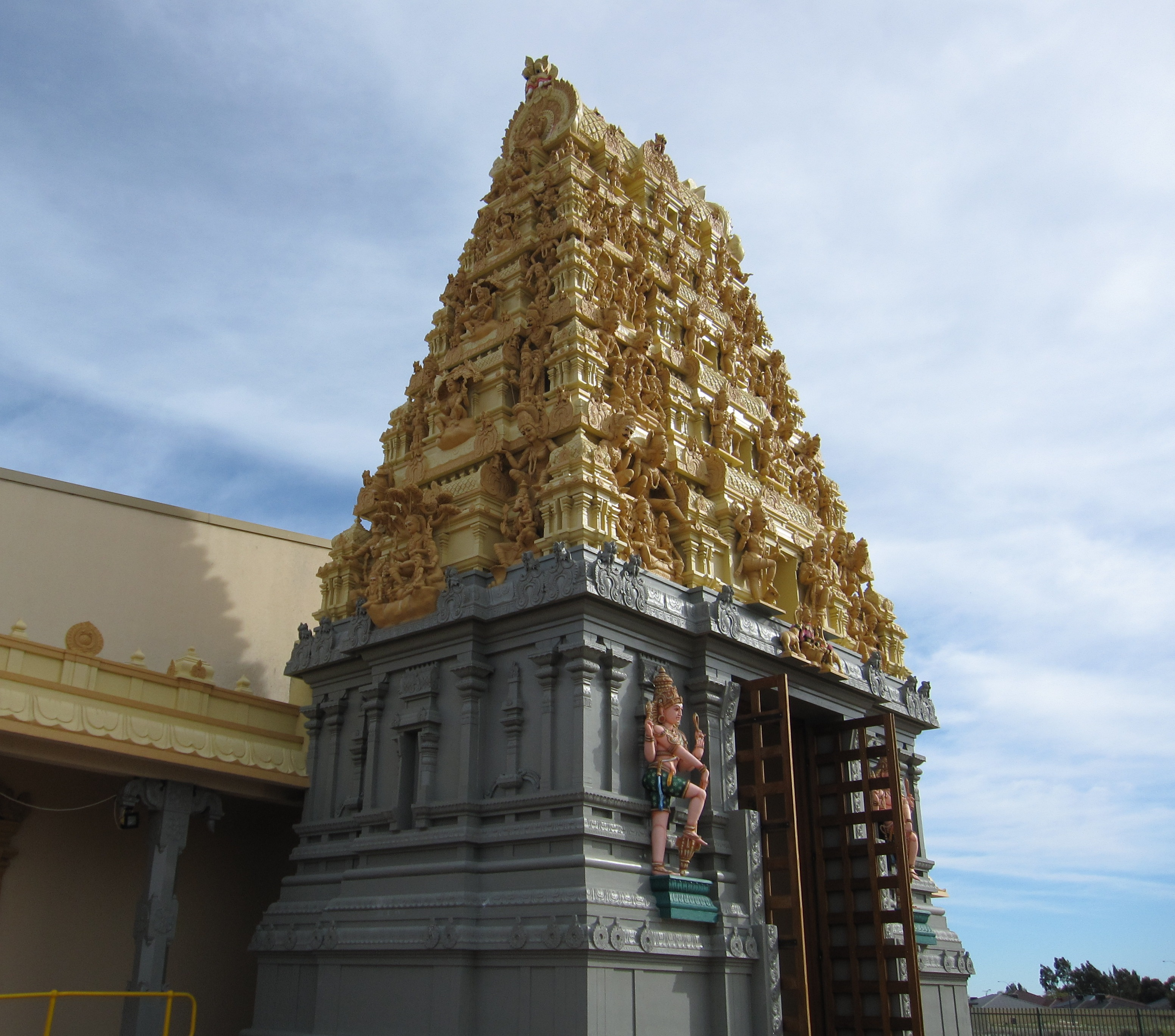
Perth Shiva Temple, Perth, Western Australia

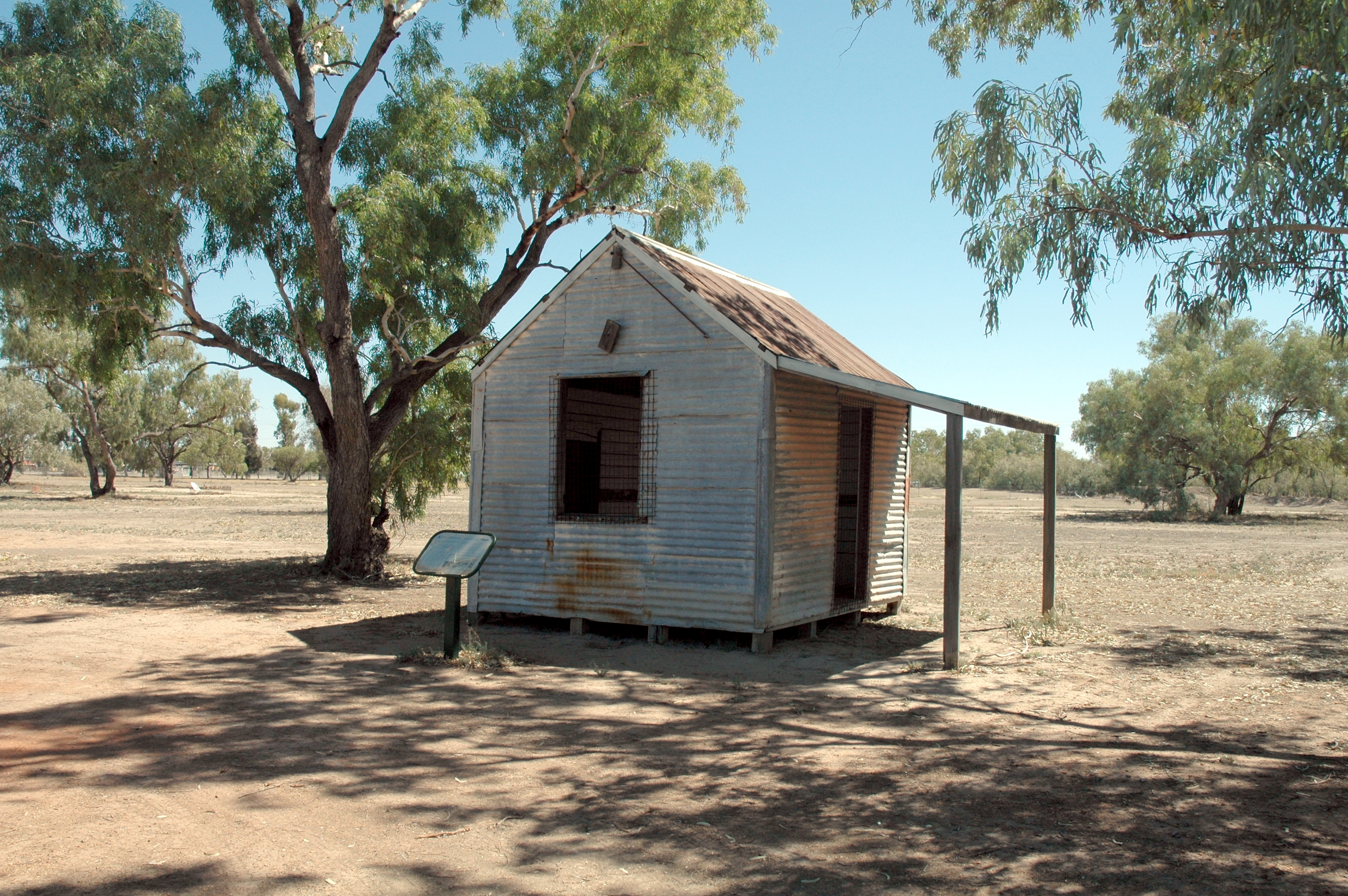
19th century mosque, Bourke, New South Wales

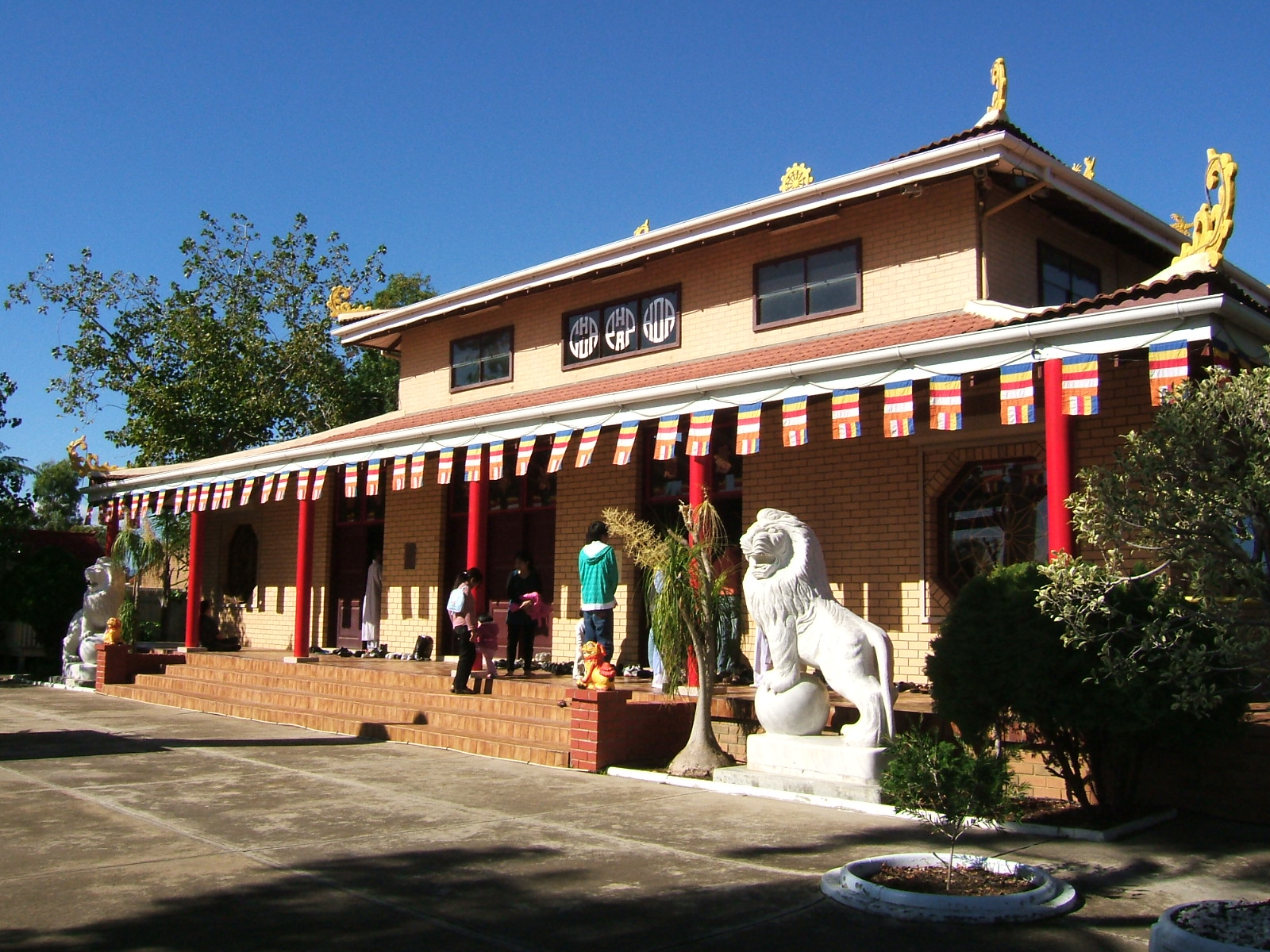
Phap Hoa Vietnamese Buddhist temple, Adelaide, South Australia

There were at least 15 Jews in the First Fleet, 14 convicts and one "free" child.

The Tolpuddle Martyrs were sentenced to penal transportation to Australia because friendly societies had strong elements of what are now considered to be the predominant role of trade unions.

As noted above, the Australian gold rushes brought in workers from China and the Pacific islands, as well as specialised workers from British India such as, from the 1860s onwards, the mainly Muslim "Afghan Cameleers". From the 1870s Malay divers were recruited (with most subsequently repatriated). Before 1901, some Muslim sailors and prisoners came to Australia on convict ships.

In 1901, the government passed an act limiting immigration to those of European descent in what came to be known as the White Australia Policy. By effectively limiting the immigration of practitioners of different faiths, this policy ensured that Christianity remained the religion of the overwhelming majority of Australians for the foreseeable future and, indeed, to the present day. The first census in 1911 showed 96% identified themselves as Christian. Sectarian tensions continued into the 1960s; e.g. job vacancy advertisements sometimes stated "Protestant preferred" or that "Catholics need not apply". Nevertheless, Australia elected its first Catholic prime minister, James Scullin, in 1929, and in 1930 Sir Isaac Isaacs, an Australian-born Jew, was appointed Governor-General.

== Demographics ==
A question on religion has been asked in every census taken in Australia, with the voluntary nature of this question having been specifically stated since 1933. In 1971, the instruction "if no religion, write none" was introduced. This saw a sevenfold increase from the previous census year in the percentage of Australians stating they had no religion. Since 1971, this percentage has progressively increased to 38.9% in 2021.

The Australian Bureau of Statistics (ABS) 2006 Census Dictionary statement on religious affiliation states the purpose for gathering such information:

Data on religious affiliation are used for such purposes as planning educational facilities, aged persons' care and other social services provided by religion-based organisations; the location of church buildings; the assigning of chaplains to hospitals, prisons, armed services and universities; the allocation of time on public radio and other media; and sociological research.

The census question about religion is optional, and asks "What is the person's religion?", giving respondents a choice of nine religions, "Other" and "No religion". At the 2016 census 9.6% of people declined to answer, or they did not give a response adequate for interpretation. This figure dropped to 7.2% in 2021.

The 2021 Australian census data showed that 43.9% of Australians classify themselves Christian, 8.2% less in real terms than five years prior, The second-largest classification was the 38.9% who identified as "no religion". As in many Western countries, the level of active participation in church worship is much lower than this. According to the National Church Life Survey conducted by NCLS Research in 2018, one in five Australians can be described as a “frequent attendee”, i.e. attending religious services at least once a month. This includes 13% who report attending religious services at least once a week and 8% who attend at least once a month. Almost half (48%) of Australians report never attending religious services.

The fastest growing religious classifications over the fifteen years between 2006 and 2021 were:

- No religion – up from 18.7% to 38.9%
- Islam – up from 1.7% to 3.2%
- Hinduism – up from 0.7% to 2.7%
- Sikhism – up from 0.1% to 0.8%
- Buddhism - from 2.1% to 2.4%

Meanwhile, all Christian denominations combined decreased from 63.9% to 43.9%.

=== Census data ===
Religious declarations of Australians according to the censuses of 1986 to 2021
| Affiliation | 1986 | | 1996 | | 2006 | | 2011 | | 2016 | | 2021 | |
| Affiliation | Count ('000) | % | Count ('000) | % | Count ('000) | % | Count ('000) | % | Count ('000) | % | Count ('000) | % |
|---|---|---|---|---|---|---|---|---|---|---|---|---|
| Anglican | 3,723.4 | 23.9 | 3,903.3 | 22.0 | 3,718.3 | 18.7 | 3,680.0 | 17.1 | 3,101.2 | 13.3 | 2,496.3 | 9.8 |
| Baptist | 196.8 | 1.3 | 295.2 | 1.7 | 316.7 | 1.6 | 352.5 | 1.6 | 345.1 | 1.5 | 347.3 | 1.4 |
| Catholic | 4,064.4 | 26.1 | 4,799.0 | 27.0 | 5,126.9 | 25.8 | 5,439.2 | 25.3 | 5,291.8 | 22.6 | 5,075.9 | 20.0 |
| Churches of Christ | 88.5 | 0.6 | 75.0 | 0.4 | 54.8 | 0.3 | 49.7 | 0.2 | 39.6 | 0.2 | 35.9 | 0.1 |
| Jehovah's Witnesses | 66.5 | 0.4 | 83.4 | 0.5 | 80.9 | 0.4 | 85.6 | 0.4 | 82.5 | 0.4 | 84.4 | 0.3 |
| Latter Day Saints | 35.5 | 0.2 | 45.2 | 0.3 | 53.1 | 0.3 | 59.8 | 0.3 | 61.6 | 0.3 | 57.9 | 0.2 |
| Lutheran | 208.3 | 1.3 | 250.0 | 1.4 | 251.1 | 1.3 | 251.9 | 1.2 | 174 | 0.7 | 145.9 | 0.6 |
| Eastern Orthodox | 427.4 | 2.5 | 497.3 | 2.5 | 544.3 | 2.6 | 563.1 | 2.6 | 582.8 | 2.6 | 535.5 | 2.1 |
| Pentecostal | 107.0 | 0.7 | 174.6 | 1.0 | 219.6 | 1.1 | 238.0 | 1.1 | 260.6 | 1.1 | 259.8 | 1.1 |
| Presbyterian & Reformed | 560.0 | 3.6 | 675.5 | 3.8 | 596.7 | 3.0 | 599.5 | 2.8 | 526.7 | 2.3 | 414.9 | 1.6 |
| Salvation Army | 77.8 | 0.5 | 74.1 | 0.4 | 64.2 | 0.3 | 60.2 | 0.3 | 48.9 | 0.2 | 35.4 | 0.1 |
| Seventh-day Adventist | 48.0 | 0.3 | 52.7 | 0.3 | 55.3 | 0.3 | 63.0 | 0.3 | 62.9 | 0.3 | 63.7 | 0.3 |
| Uniting Church | 1,182.3 | 7.6 | 1,334.9 | 7.5 | 1,135.4 | 5.7 | 1,065.8 | 5.0 | 870.2 | 3.7 | 673.3 | 2.7 |
| Other Christian | 596.0 | 3.8 | 322.7 | 1.8 | 468.6 | 2.4 | 642.4 | 3.0 | 833.5 | 3.6 | 926.8 | 3.7 |
| Christian total | 11,381.9 | 73.0 | 12,582.9 | 70.9 | 12,685.9 | 63.9 | 13,150.6 | 61.1 | 12,201.6 | 52.1 | 11,148.8 | 43.9 |
| Buddhism | 80.4 | 0.5 | 199.8 | 1.1 | 418.8 | 2.1 | 529.0 | 2.5 | 563.7 | 2.4 | 615.8 | 2.4 |
| Hinduism | 21.5 | 0.1 | 67.3 | 0.4 | 148.1 | 0.7 | 275.5 | 1.3 | 440.3 | 1.9 | 684.0 | 2.7 |
| Sikhism | | | 12.0 | <0.1 | 26.4 | 0.1 | 72.3 | 0.3 | 125.9 | 0.5 | 210.4 | 0.8 |
| Islam | 109.5 | 0.7 | 200.9 | 1.1 | 340.4 | 1.7 | 476.3 | 2.2 | 604.2 | 2.6 | 813.4 | 3.2 |
| Judaism | 69.1 | 0.4 | 79.8 | 0.4 | 88.8 | 0.4 | 97.3 | 0.5 | 91 | 0.4 | 100.0 | 0.4 |
| Other non-Christian | 35.7 | 0.2 | 56.6 | 0.3 | 82.6 | 0.4 | 95.9 | 0.4 | 95.7 | 0.4 | 115.0 | 0.5 |
| Non-Christian total | 316.2 | 2.0 | 616.4 | 3.5 | 1,105.1 | 5.6 | 1,546.3 | 7.2 | 1,920.8 | 8.2 | 2,538.6 | 10.0 |
| No religion^{1} | 1,977.5 | 12.7 | 2,948.9 | 16.6 | 3,706.5 | 18.7 | 4,796.8 | 22.3 | 7,040.7 | 30.1 | 9,887.0 | 38.9 |
| Not stated^{2} | 1,926.6 | 12.3 | 1,604.8 | 9.0 | 2,357.8 | 11.9 | 2,014.0 | 9.4 | 2,345.5 | 10 | 1,751.4 | 7.3 |
| Totals^{3} | 15,602.1 | 100.0 | 17,753.0 | 100.0 | 19,855.3 | 100.0 | 21,507.7 | 100.0 | 23,401.4 | 100.0 | 25,422.8 | 100.0 |

1: Includes relatively small numbers declaring "secular beliefs", such as atheism, agnosticism, humanism and rationalism, and spiritual beliefs such as New Age, "own spiritual beliefs", theism(!), etc. See 7

2: Includes "inadequately described"

3: Due to rounding, figures may not add up to the totals shown.

=== Line and bar charts ===
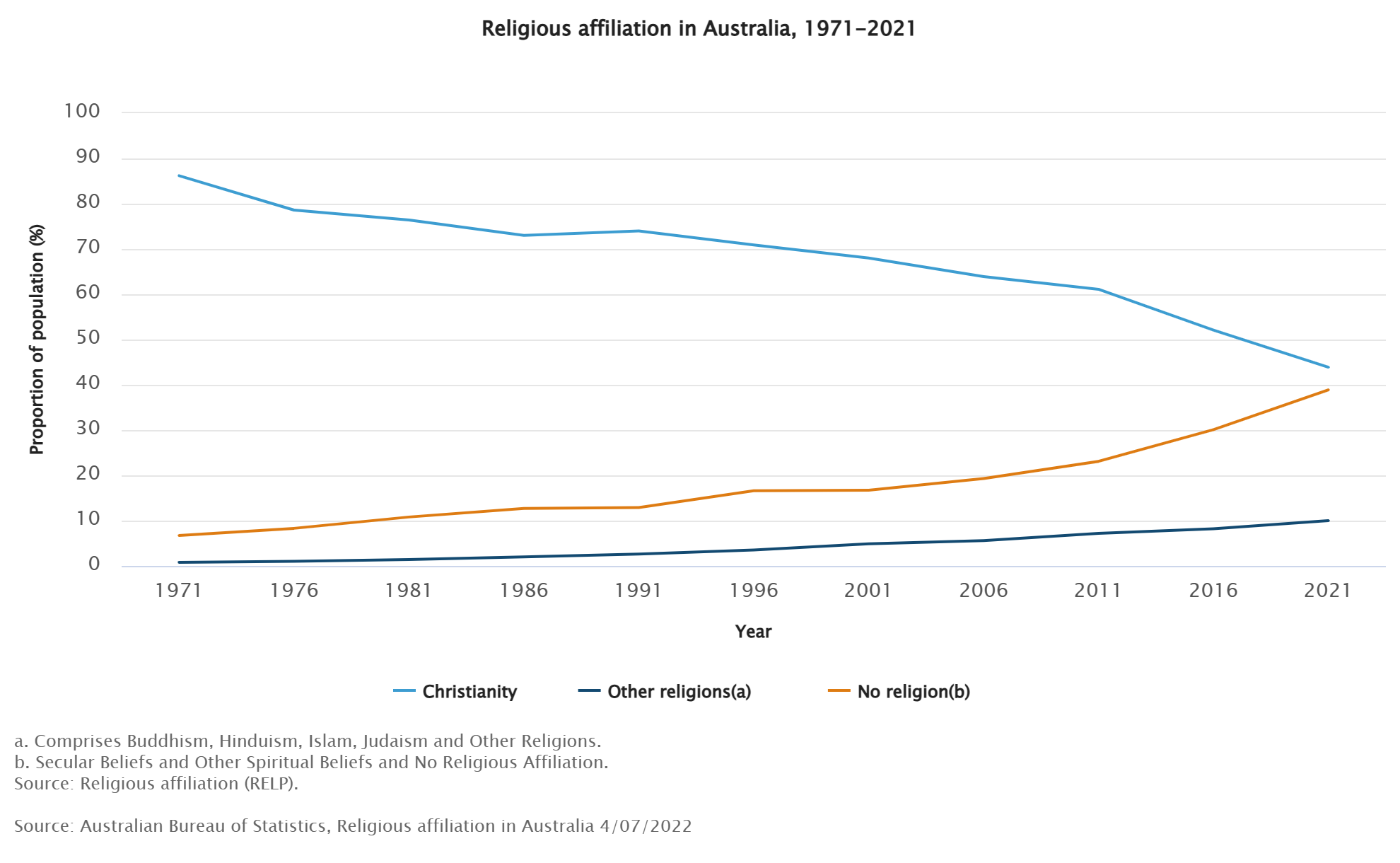
Religious affiliation in Australia, 1971-2021

"Over the past 50 years, there has been a steady decline in the proportion of Australians who reported an affiliation with Christianity. The same period has seen a consistent rise in Other religions and No religion, particularly in the last 20 years".

=== Total fertility rates ===
As of 2016, Buddhists (1.68), Hindus (1.81) and the non-religious (1.84) had the lowest fertility rates. Christians (2.11) and Jews (2.17) had moderate fertility rates, and Muslims had the highest rate at 3.03.

== Christianity ==
Christianity in Australia (2021 census)
1. Catholicism (20.0%)
2. Protestantism (17.6%)
3. Eastern Orthodoxy (2.10%)
4. Restorationism (0.50%)
5. Other Christians (3.70%)
6. No religion (38.9%)
7. Not Stated (7.20%)
8. Other Religions (10.0%)

After the arrival of the first Christian settlers on the First Fleet of British ships in 1788, Christianity quickly became the major religion in Australia. Consequently, the Christian festivals of Christmas and Easter are public holidays, the skylines of Australian cities and towns are marked by church and cathedral spires. Christian churches played a significant role in the development of early education, health and welfare services in Australia.

The churches with the largest number of members are the Catholic Church, the Anglican Church of Australia and the Uniting Church in Australia. The National Council of Churches in Australia has been the main Christian ecumenical body.

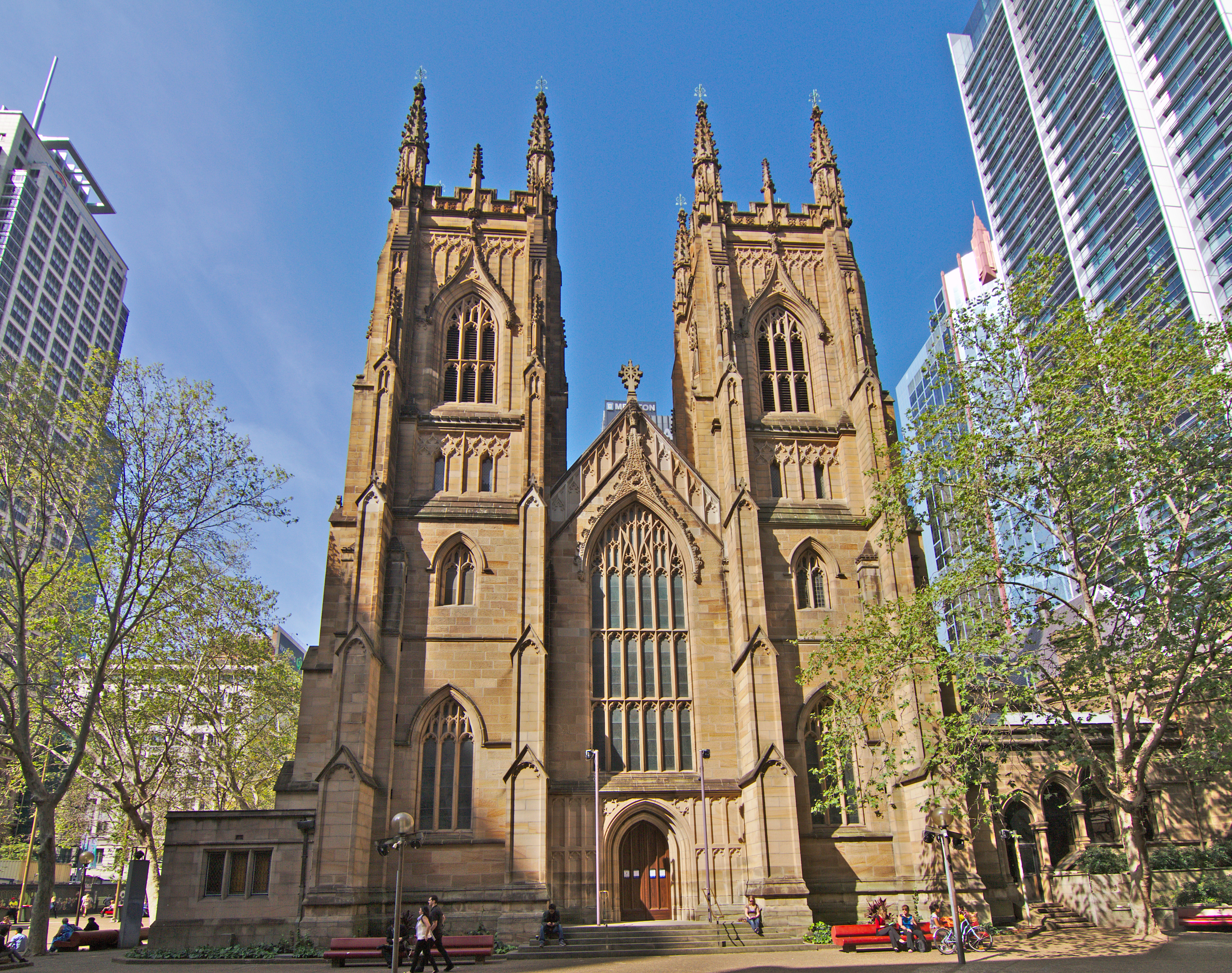
St. Andrew's Anglican Cathedral in Sydney, New South Wales.

The Christian churches played an integral role in the development and provision of welfare services in Australia. The first chaplain, Richard Johnson, a Church of England cleric, was charged by Governor Arthur Phillip with improving "public morality" in the colony, and he was also heavily involved in health and education.

For much of Australian history, the Church of England in Australia, now known as the Anglican Church of Australia, was the largest religious affiliation. However its relative position has declined, with the Catholic Church, benefiting from post-war Australia multicultural immigration, among other factors, to become the largest single religious group. The Greek Orthodox Archdiocese of Australia and other congregations associated with non-British cultures have also expanded.

Today, the Catholic education system is the second biggest sector after government schools, with more than 750,000 students in 2018 (and around 21 per cent of all secondary school enrolments). The Anglican Church educates around 105,000 students and the Uniting Church has around 48 schools. Smaller denominations, including the Lutheran Church also have a number of schools in Australia. The Greek Orthodox Archdiocese of Australia also has 8 schools across the country. There are two Catholic universities in Australia: the Australian Catholic University which opened in 1991 following the amalgamation of four Catholic tertiary institutions in eastern Australia, and the University of Notre Dame Australia based in Perth.

Catholic Social Services Australia's 63 member organisations help more than a million Australians every year. Anglican organisations work in health, missionary work, social welfare and communications; and the Uniting Church does extensive community work, in aged care, hospitals, nursing, family support services, youth services and with the homeless, and especially throughout inland Australia. Christian charities such as the Saint Vincent de Paul Society, the Salvation Army, Anglicare, and Youth Off the Streets receive considerable national support. Religious orders founded many of Australia's hospitals, such as St Vincent's Hospital, Sydney, which was opened as a free hospital in 1857 by the Sisters of Charity and is now Australia's largest not-for-profit health provider and has trained prominent Australian surgeons such as Victor Chang.

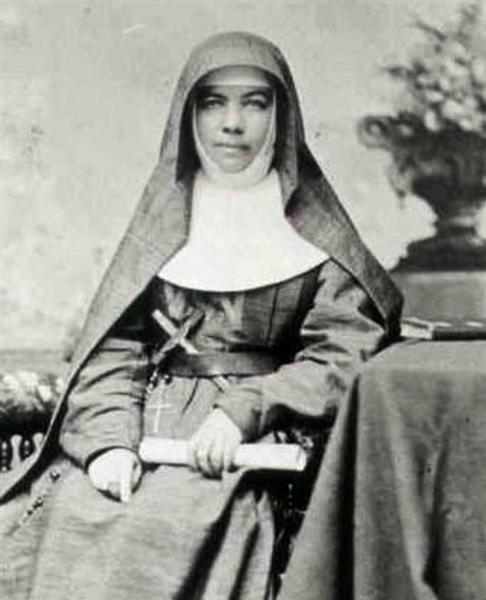
Mary MacKillop became the first Australian to be canonised as a saint of the Catholic Church in 2010.

Notable Australian Christians have included: Mary MacKillop – educator, founder of the Sisters of St Joseph of the Sacred Heart and the first Australian to be recognised as a saint by the Catholic Church; David Unaipon – an Aboriginal writer, inventor and Christian preacher currently featured on the Australian $50 note; Archbishop Daniel Mannix of Melbourne – a controversial voice against Conscription during World War I and against British policy in Ireland; the Reverend John Flynn – founder of the Royal Flying Doctor Service, currently featured on the Australian $20 note; Sir Douglas Nicholls – Aboriginal rights activist, athlete, pastor and former Governor of South Australia; Archbishop Stylianos Harkianakis – Archbishop and primate of the Greek Orthodox church in Australia from 1975 to 2019

Sectarianism in Australia tended to reflect the political inheritance of Britain and Ireland. Until 1945, the vast majority of Catholics in Australia were of Irish descent, causing the British majority to question their loyalty to the British Empire. The first Catholic priests arrived in Australia as convicts in 1800, but the Castle Hill Rebellion of 1804 alarmed the British authorities and no further priests were allowed in the colony until 1820, when London sent John Joseph Therry and Philip Connolly. In 1901, the Australian Constitution guaranteed Separation of Church and State. A notable period of sectarianism re-emerged during the First World War and the 1916 Easter Uprising in Ireland, but sectarian division declined after World War II. There was a diversification of Christian churches (especially with the growth of Greek, Macedonian, Serbian and Russian Orthodox churches), together with an increase in ecumenism among Christians through organisations such as the National Council of Churches in Australia, as well as an increase in non-religious adherence.

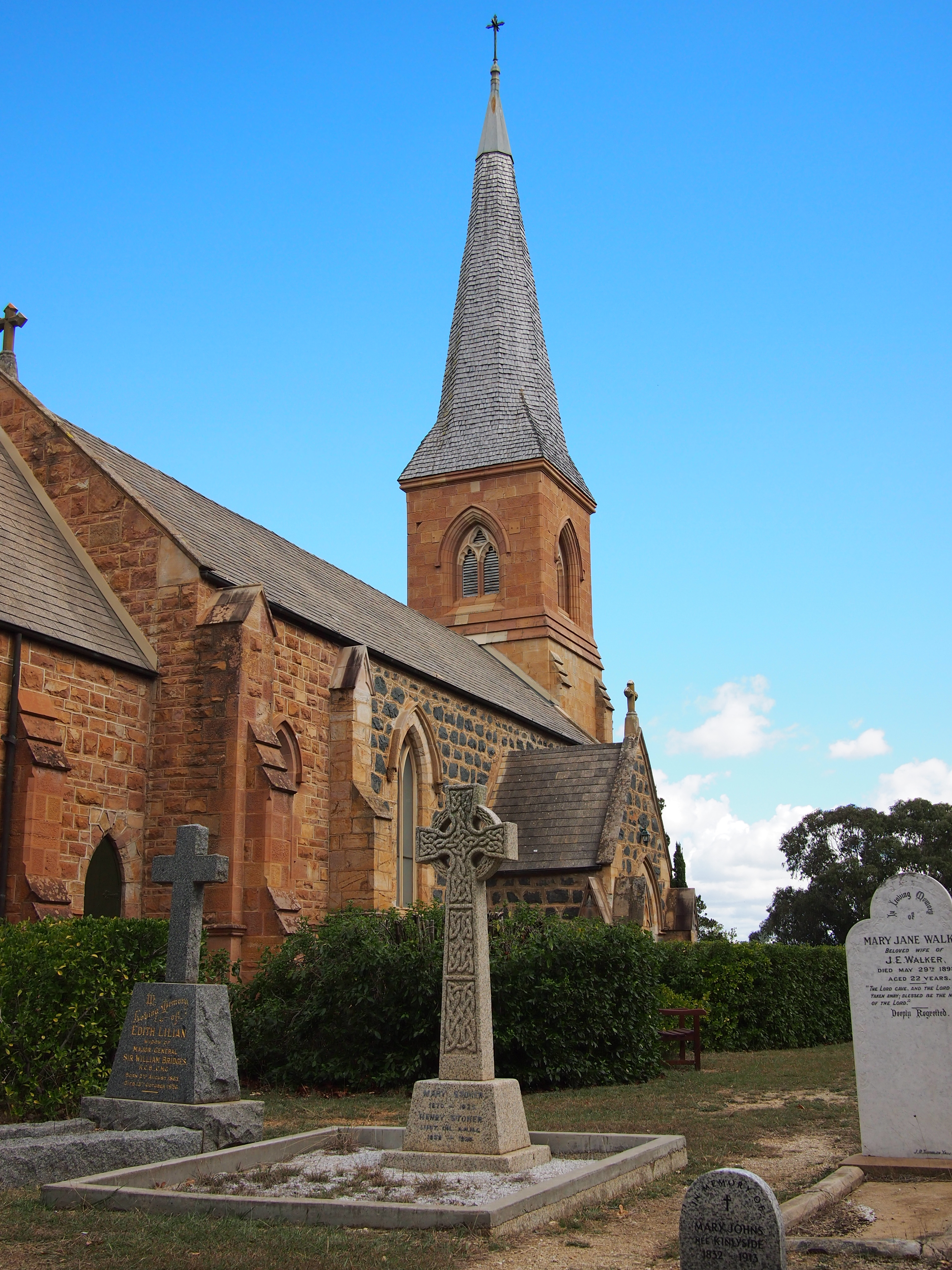
St John's Anglican Church, the oldest church in Australia's capital city, Canberra, was consecrated in 1845.

One of the most visible signs of the historical importance of Christianity to Australia is the prominence of churches in most Australian towns and cities. Among Australia's oldest are Ebenezer Chapel and the Anglican St Matthew's, Windsor, St Luke's, Liverpool, St Peter's, Campbelltown and St James Church, Sydney, built between 1819 and 1824 by Governor Macquarie's architect, Francis Greenway. St Mary's Cathedral, Sydney, was built to a design by William Wardell from a foundation stone laid in 1868; the spires of the cathedral were not finally added until the year 2000. Wardell also worked on the design of St Patrick's Cathedral, Melbourne – among the finest examples of ecclesiastical architecture in Australia. The Anglican St Paul's Cathedral, Melbourne, in the iconic hub of the city opposite Flinders Street station. Adelaide is known as the "City of Churches", but churches extend far into the Australian Outback, as at the historic Lutheran Mission Chapel at Hermannsburg, Northern Territory. Along with community attitudes to religion, church architecture changed significantly during the 20th century. Urban churches, such as the Wayside Chapel (1964) in Sydney, differed markedly from traditional ecclesiastical designs. In the later 20th century, distinctly Australian approaches were applied at places such as Jambaroo Benedictine Abbey, where natural materials were chosen to "harmonise with the local environment" and the chapel sanctuary is of glass overlooking rainforest. Similar design principles were applied at Thredbo Ecumenical Chapel built in the Snowy Mountains in 1996.

The Christian festivals of Christmas and Easter are national public holidays in Australia. Christmas, which recalls the birth of Jesus Christ, is celebrated on 25 December during the Australian summer (although on 7 January by some Eastern Orthodox) and is an important cultural festival even for many non-religious Australians. The European traditions of Christmas trees, roast dinners, carols and gift giving are all continued in Australia, but they might be conducted between visits to the beach.

Here are some Christian denominations with Australian articles:

- Anglican Church of Australia (formerly the Church of England in Australia)
- Antiochian Orthodox Archdiocese of Australia
- Australian Christian Churches (formerly the Assemblies of God in Australia)
- Australian Union Conference of Seventh-day Adventists
- Baptist Union of Australia
- Christian City Churches, started in Australia
- Churches of Christ in Australia
- The Church of Jesus Christ of Latter-day Saints in Australia
- Fellowship of Congregational Churches, Australian only
- Greek Orthodox Archdiocese of Australia
- CRC Churches International
- Lutheran Church of Australia
- Presbyterian Church of Australia
- Presbyterian Church of Eastern Australia
- Presbyterian Reformed Church (Australia)
- Catholic Church in Australia
- Uniting Church in Australia
- Two by Twos

== Other Abrahamic religions ==
=== Islam ===
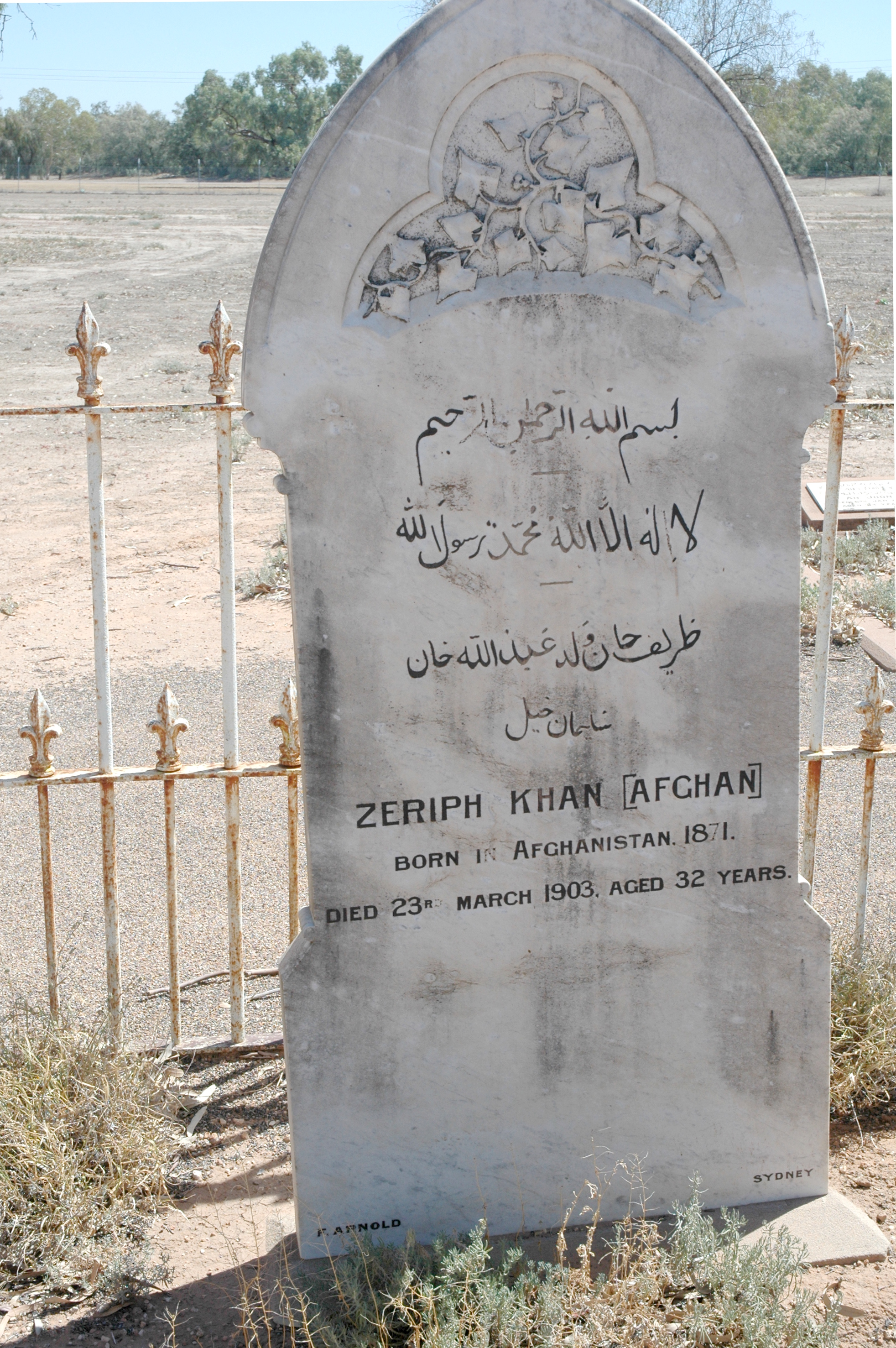
Grave of Afghan camel driver Zeriph Khan (1871–1903) at Bourke Cemetery, New South Wales Australia. Muslims from British India formed some of Australia's earliest Islamic communities.

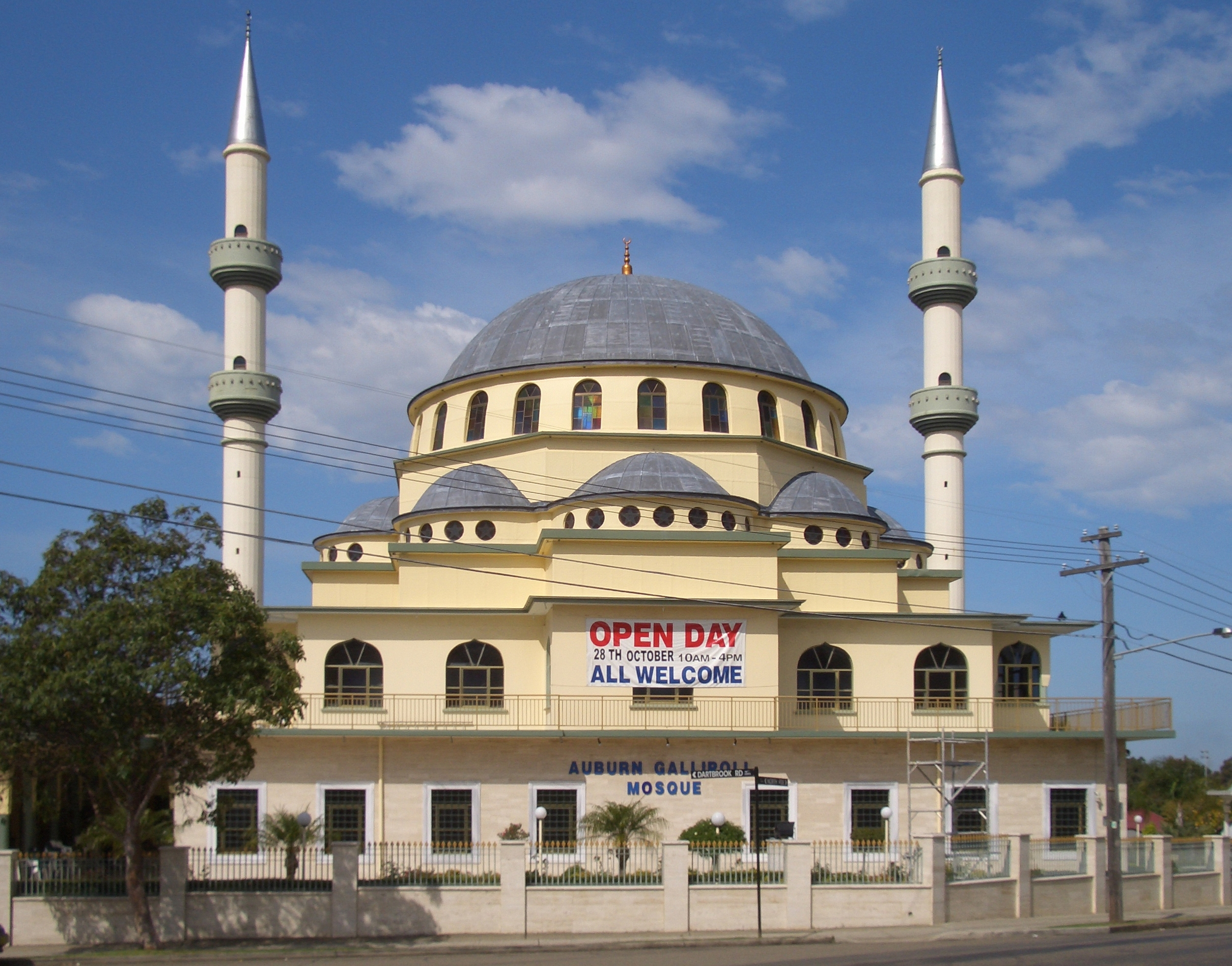
Auburn Gallipoli Mosque was built in the classical Ottoman style by Sydney's Turkish Muslim community.

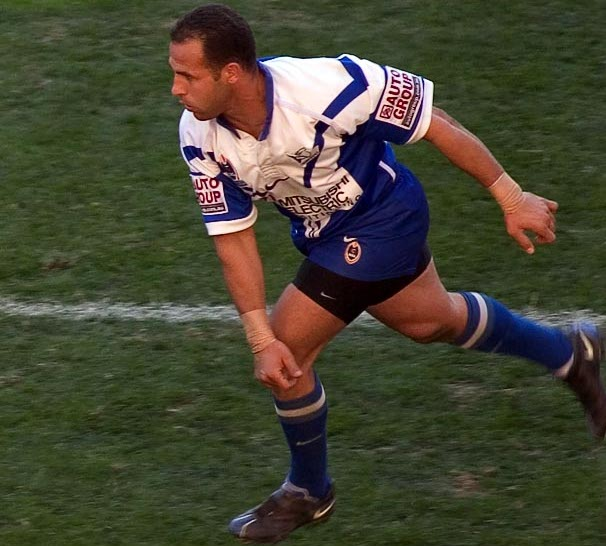
Rugby League player Hazem El Masri is a member of Australia's large Lebanese-Australian Muslim community.

The first contacts that Islam had with Australia was when Muslim fishermen native to Makassar, which is today a part of Indonesia, visited North-Western Australia long before British settlement in 1788. This contact of South East Asian ethnic groups of Islamic faith can be identified from the graves they dug for their comrades who died on the journey, being that they face Mecca (in Arabia), in accordance with Islamic regulations concerning burial, as well as evidence from Aboriginal cave paintings and religious ceremonies which depict and incorporate the adoption of Makassan canoe designs and words.

In later history, throughout the 19th century following British settlement, other Muslims came to Australia including the Muslim 'Afghan' cameleers, who used their camels to transport goods and people through the otherwise unnavigable desert and pioneered a network of camel tracks that later became roads across the Outback. Australia's first mosque was built for them at Marree, South Australia in 1861. Between the 1860s and 1920s around 2000 cameleers were brought from Afghanistan and the north west of British India (now Pakistan) and perhaps 100 families remained in Australia. Other outback mosques were established at places like Coolgardie, Cloncurry, and Broken Hill – and more permanent mosques in Adelaide, Perth and later Brisbane. A legacy of this pioneer era is the presence of wild camels in Outback and the oldest Islamic structure in the Southern Hemisphere, at Central Adelaide Mosque. Nonetheless, despite their significant role in Australia prior to the establishment of rail and road networks, the formulation of the White Australia policy at the time of Federation made immigration difficult for the 'Afghans' and their memory slowly faded during the 20th century, until a revival of interest began in the 1980s.

Successive Australian governments dismantled the White Australia Policy in the Post-WW2 period. From the 1970s onwards, under the leadership of Gough Whitlam and Malcolm Fraser, Australia began to pursue multiculturalism. Australia in the later 20th century became a refuge for many Muslims fleeing conflicts including those in Lebanon, Bosnia, Iraq, Iran, Sudan and Afghanistan. General immigration, combined with religious conversion to Islam by Christians and other Australians, as well as Australia's participation in UN refugee efforts has increased the overall Muslim population. Around 36% of Muslims are Australian born. Overseas born Muslims come from a great variety of nations and ethnic groups – with large Lebanese and Turkish communities.

Following the 11 September attacks in the USA, attempts to associate the ideology/ies of Osama bin Laden and the religion of Islam stirred some debate in some quarters in Australia about Islam's relationship with the wider community. The deaths of Australians in bombings by militant Islamic fundamentalists in New York in 2001, Bali in 2002–5 and London in 2005; as well as the sending of Australian troops to East Timor in 1999, Afghanistan in 2001 and Iraq in 2003; the arrest of bomb plotters in Australia; and concerns about certain cultural practices such as the wearing of the Burkha all contributed to a degree of tension. A series of comments by a senior Sydney cleric, Sheikh Taj El-Din Hilaly also stirred controversy, particularly his remarks regarding "female modesty" following an incident of gang rape in Sydney. Australians were among the targets of Islamic Fundamentalists in the Bali bombings in Indonesia and an attack on the Australian Embassy in Jakarta; and the South East Asian militant group Jemaah Islamiyah has been of particular concern to Australians.

The Australian government's mandatory detention processing system for asylum seekers became increasingly controversial after the 11 September attacks. A significant proportion of recent Asylum seekers arriving by boat have been Muslims fleeing the conflicts in Iraq and Afghanistan and elsewhere. Some Islamic leaders and social commentators claim that Islam has suffered from unfair stereotyping. Violence and intimidation was directed against Muslims and people of Middle Eastern appearance during southern Sydney's Cronulla riots in 2005. In 2005, the Howard government established the Muslim Community Reference Group to advise on Muslim community issues for one year, chaired by Ameer Ali. Inter-faith dialogues were also established by Christian and Muslim groups such as The Australian Federation of Islamic Councils and the National Council of Churches in Australia. Australia and Indonesia co-operated closely following the Bali-bombings, not only in law-enforcement but in improving education and cross-cultural understanding, leading to a marked improvement in relations. After a series of controversies, Sheikh Taj El-Din Hilaly retired as Grand mufti of Australia in 2007 and was replaced by Fehmi Naji El-Imam AM.

Today, over 604,000 people in Australia identify as Muslim, with diverse communities concentrated mainly in Sydney and Melbourne. More than half are non-practising cultural Muslims. Since the 1970s Islamic schools have been established as well as more than 100 mosques and prayer centres. Many notable Muslim places of worship are to be found in large Australian cities, including the Central Adelaide Mosque, which was constructed during the 1880s; and Sydney's Classical Ottoman style Auburn Gallipoli Mosque, which was largely funded by the Turkish community and the name of which recalls the shared heritage of the foundation of modern Turkey and the story of the ANZACs. 1,140 people identified as Aboriginal Muslims in the 2011 census, almost double the number recorded in the 2001 census. Notable Australian Muslims include boxer Anthony Mundine; community worker and rugby league star Hazem El Masri; cricketer Usman Khawaja and academic Waleed Aly. In 2013, Labor MP Ed Husic became Australia's first Muslim member of Cabinet, briefly serving as Parliamentary Secretary to the Prime Minister and for Broadband in the short lived Second Rudd government.

=== Judaism ===
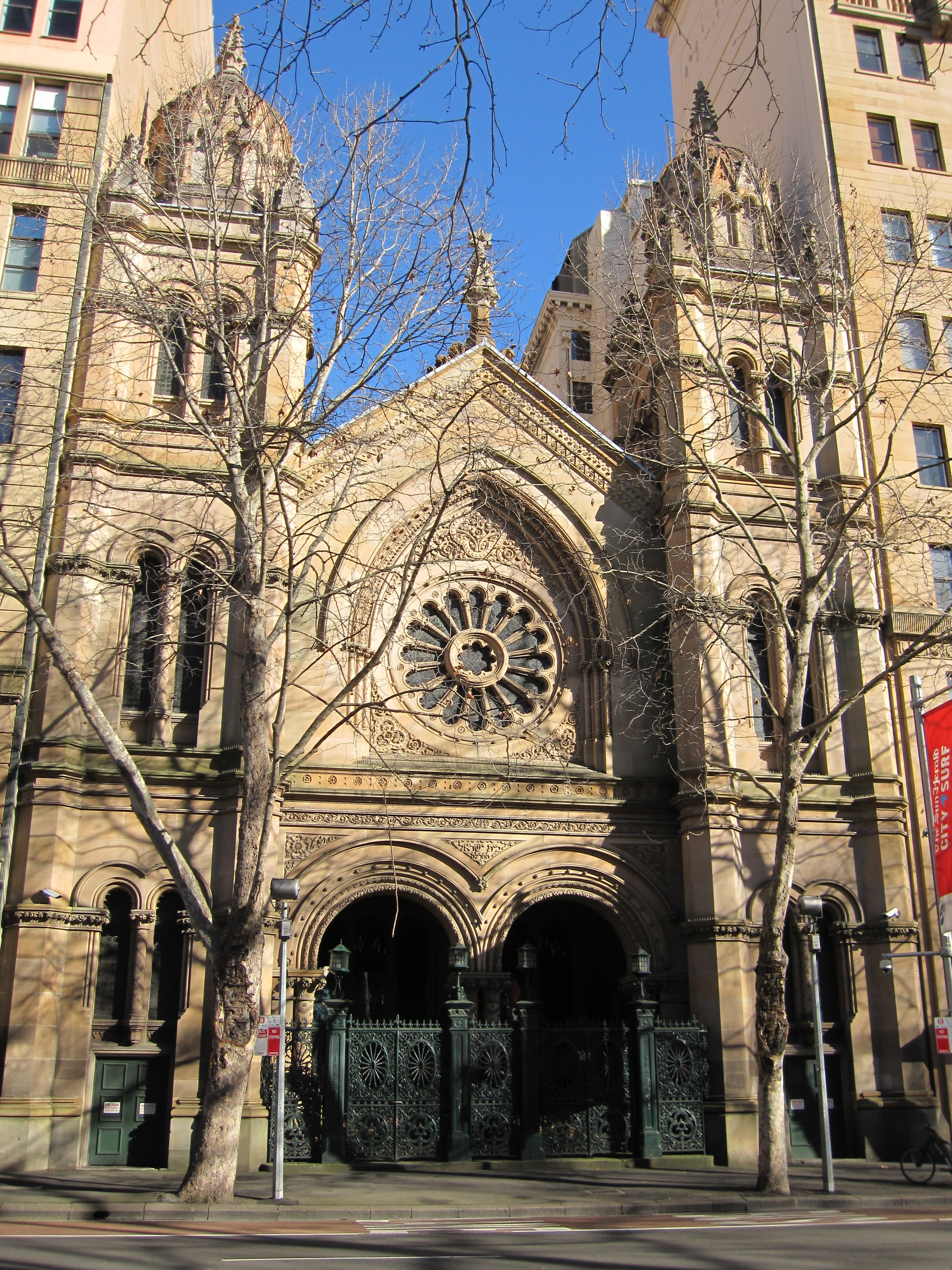
The Great Synagogue, Sydney

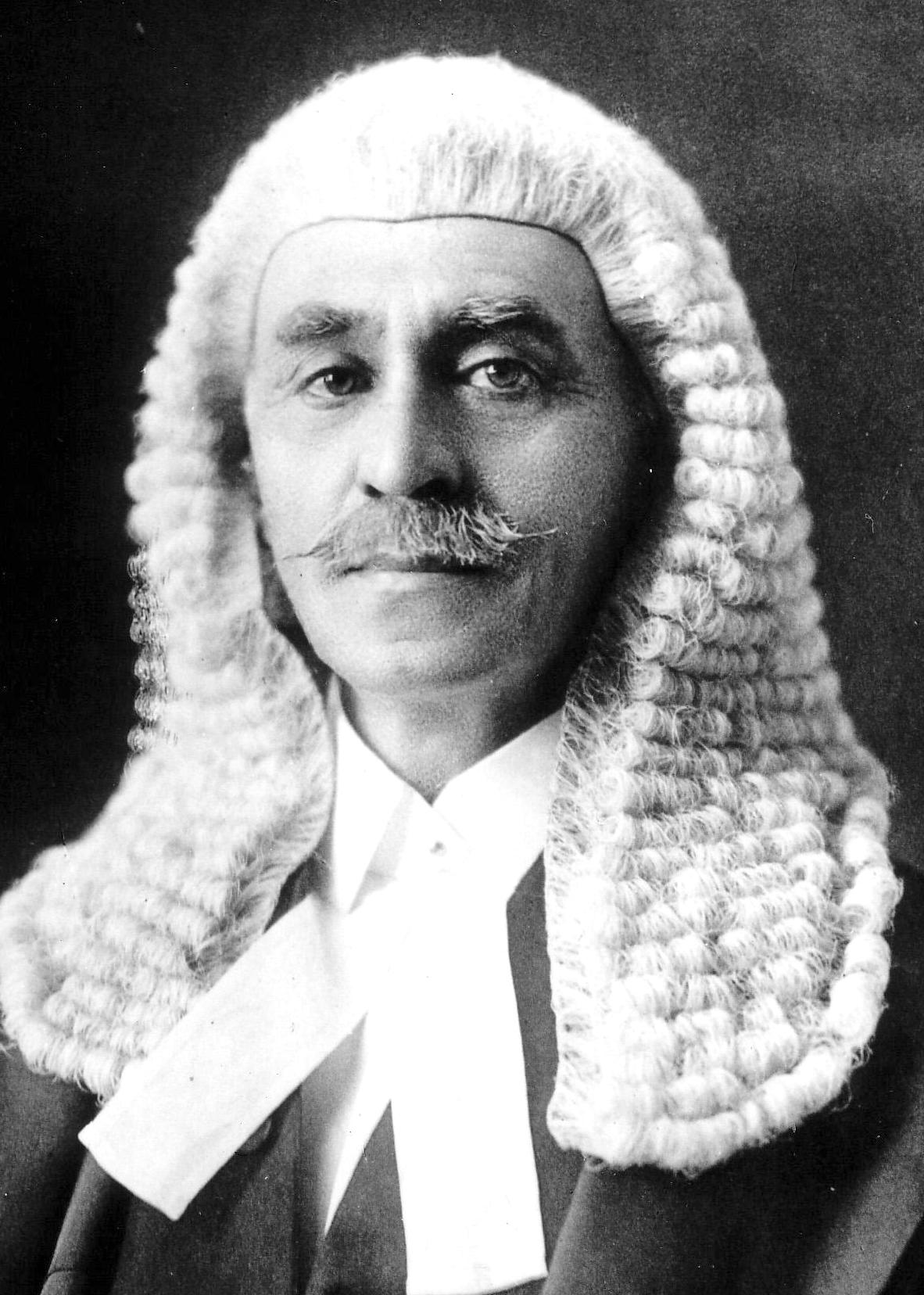
Sir Isaac Isaacs was the first Australian born Governor General of Australia and was the first Jewish vice-regal representative in the British Empire.

At least eight Jewish convicts are believed to have been transported to Sydney aboard the First Fleet in 1788, when the first British settlement was established on the continent. An estimated 110,000 Jews currently live in Australia, the majority being Ashkenazi Jews of Eastern European descent, with many being refugees and Holocaust survivors who arrived during and after World War II.

The Jewish population has increased slightly in recent times due to immigration from South Africa and the former Soviet Union. The largest Jewish community in Australia is in Melbourne, with about 60,000, followed by Sydney with about 45,000 members. Smaller communities are dispersed among the other state capitals.

Following the conclusion of the British colonial period, Jews have enjoyed formal equality before the law in Australia and have not been subject to civil disabilities or other forms of state-sponsored anti-Semitism which exclude them from full participation in public life.

Sydney's Gothic-Revival Great Synagogue, consecrated in 1878, is a notable place of Jewish worship in Australia. Notable Australian Jews have included the Sir John Monash, the notable World War I general who opened the Maccabean Hall in Sydney in 1923 to commemorate Jews who fought and died in the First World War and who is currently featured on the Australian $100 note; and Sir Isaac Isaacs who became the first Australian born governor general in 1930. Sir Zelman Cowen also served as Governor-General, between 1977 and 1982. The Sydney Jewish Museum opened in 1992 to commemorate The Holocaust "challenge visitors' perceptions of democracy, morality, social justice and human rights".

Until the 1930s, all synagogues in Australia were nominally Orthodox, with most acknowledging leadership of the Chief Rabbi of the United Kingdom. To this day the vast majority of synagogues in Australia are Orthodox. However, there is a wide range of Orthodox congregations, including Mizrachi, Chabad and Adass Israel congregations. There are also Sephardi congregations.

There had been short-lived efforts to establish Reform congregations as early as the 1890s. However, under the leadership of Ada Phillips, a sustained liberal congregation, Temple Beth Israel, was established in Melbourne. Subsequently, another synagogue linked to the United States Reform Movement, Temple Emanuel, was established in Sydney. Following these two congregations, a number of other Liberal synagogues have been founded in other cities.

Since 1992 Conservative (Masorti) services have been held as an alternative service usually in the Neuweg, the smaller second synagogue within Temple Emanuel, Woollahra, Sydney. In 1999, Kehilat Nitzan, Melbourne's first Conservative (Masorti) congregation was established, with foundation president John Rosenberg. The congregation appointed its first rabbi, Ehud Bandel in 2006. In 2010 Beit Knesset Shalom became Brisbane's first Conservative (Masorti) synagogue.

In 2012, the first humanistic Jewish congregation, known as Kehilat Kolenu, was established in Melbourne with links to the cultural Jewish youth movement Habonim Dror. Later in 2012, a similar congregation was established in Sydney, known as Ayelet HaShachar. The services are loosely based on the Humanistic Jewish movement in the United States and the musical-prayer group Nava Tehila in Israel.

=== Baháʼí Faith ===
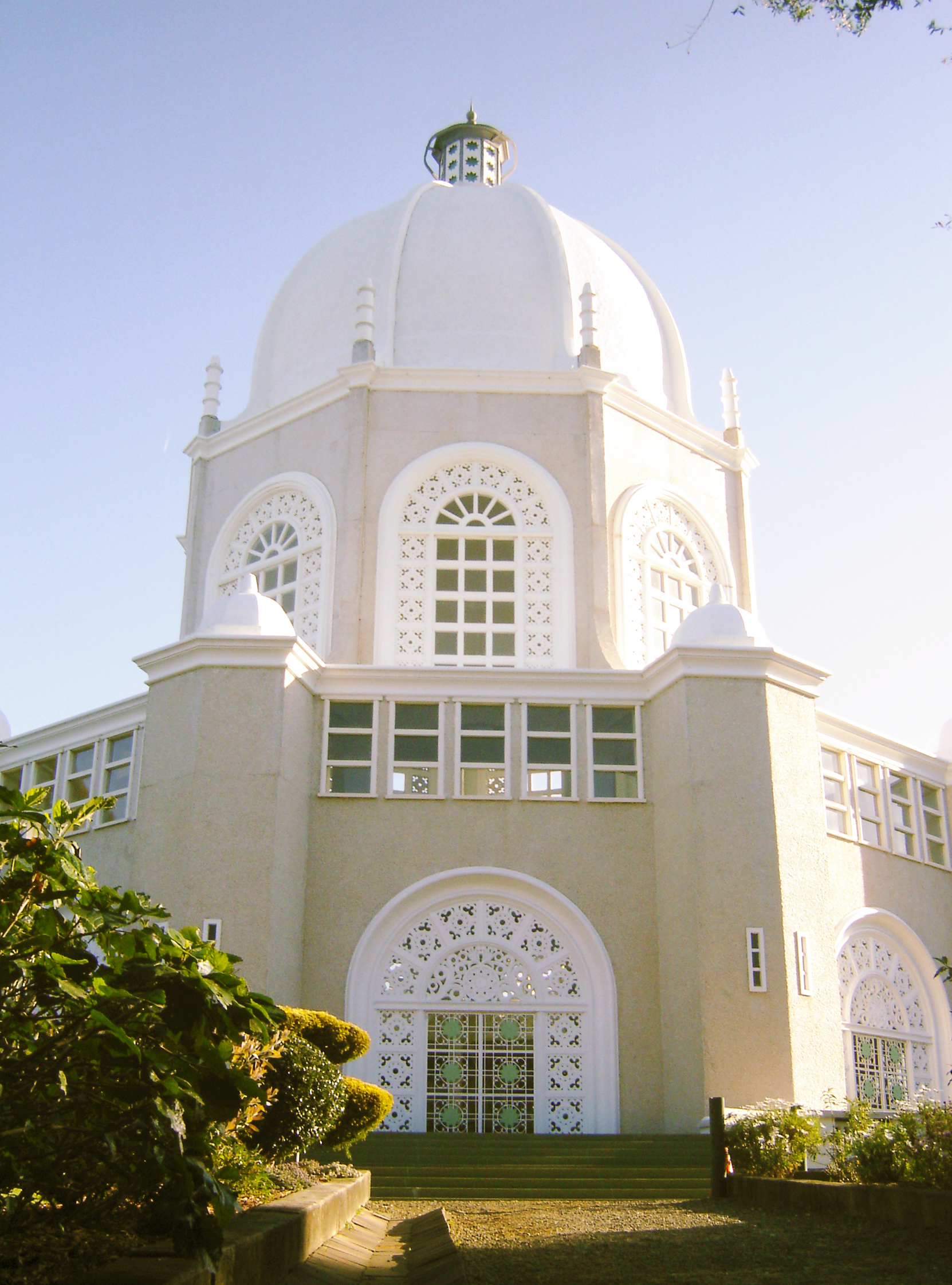
Sydney Baháʼí Temple

The Baháʼí Faith first arrived in Australia in 1922, and at less than 0.1% of the total population, is one of the smaller religious minorities. The Sydney Baháʼí Temple is situated in Ingleside, a northern suburb of Sydney. According to Jennifer Taylor, a historian at Sydney University, it is among Sydney's four most significant religious buildings constructed in the twentieth century. Dedicated in 1961, it was also the world's fourth Baháʼí House of Worship to be completed.

The 1996 Australian Census lists Baháʼí membership at just under 9,000. In 2001, the second edition of A Practical Reference to Religious Diversity for Operational Police and Emergency Services added the Baháʼí Faith to its coverage of religions in Australia and noted that the community had grown to over 11,000. Census data from 2016 reported a population of 13,988.

== Dharmic religions ==
=== Hinduism ===
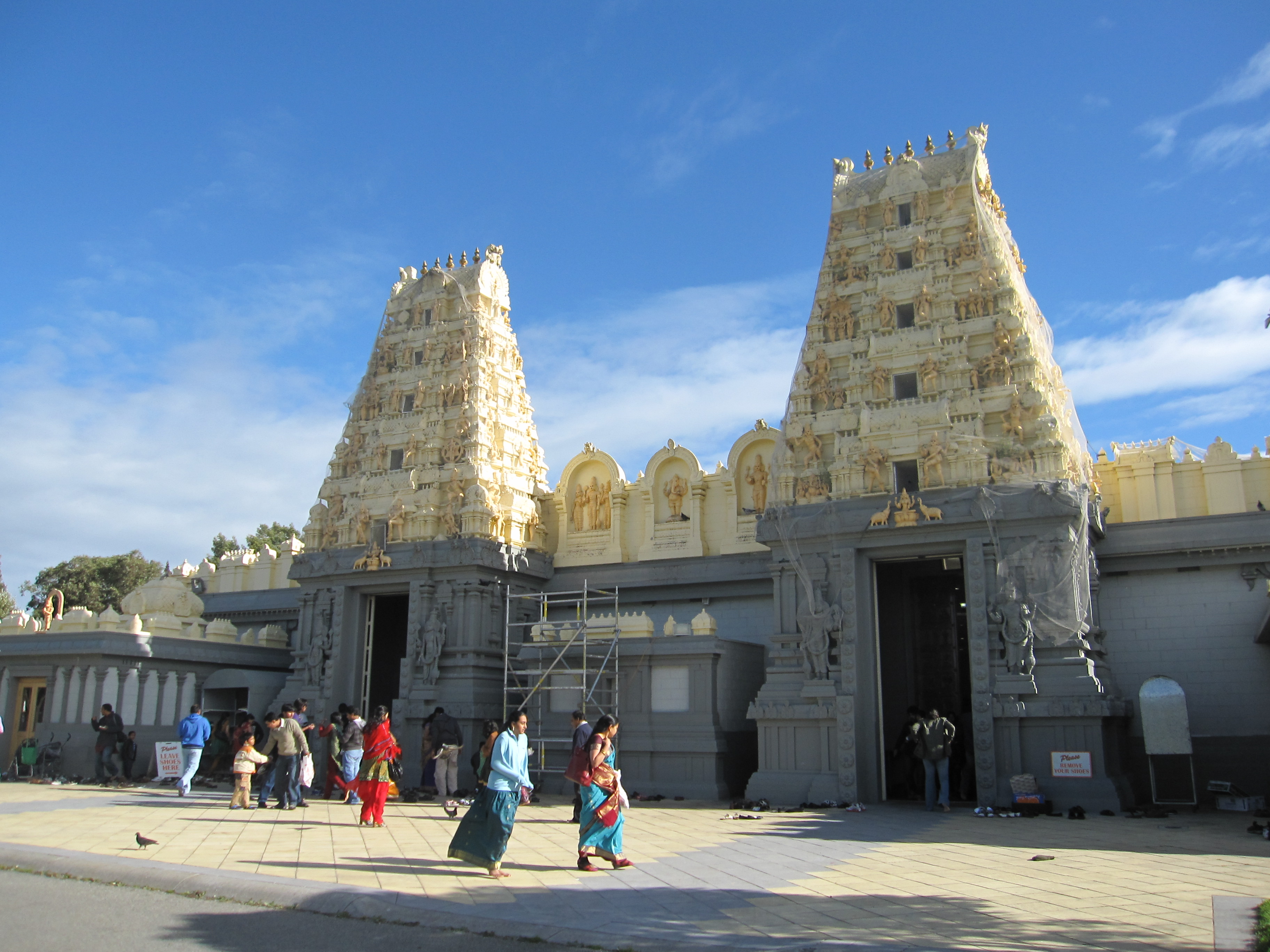
Shiva Vishnu Temple in Melbourne

Hindus numbered 684,000 in the 2021 census, making Hinduism the fourth largest religious or non-religious affiliation. It is one of the fastest growing religions in Australia (12.0% per year since 2011). In the 19th century, Hindus first came to Australia to work on cotton and sugar plantations. Many who remained worked in small business, as camel drivers, merchants and hawkers, selling goods between small rural communities. Their population increased dramatically from the 1960s and 1970s and more than doubled between the 1996 and 2006 census to around 148,000 people. Most were migrants from countries such as Fiji, India, Sri Lanka, Malaysia, Singapore and South Africa. Among Australia's best-known Hindus is the singer Kamahl. Sri Mandir in Auburn, Sydney, was established in 1977.

=== Buddhism ===
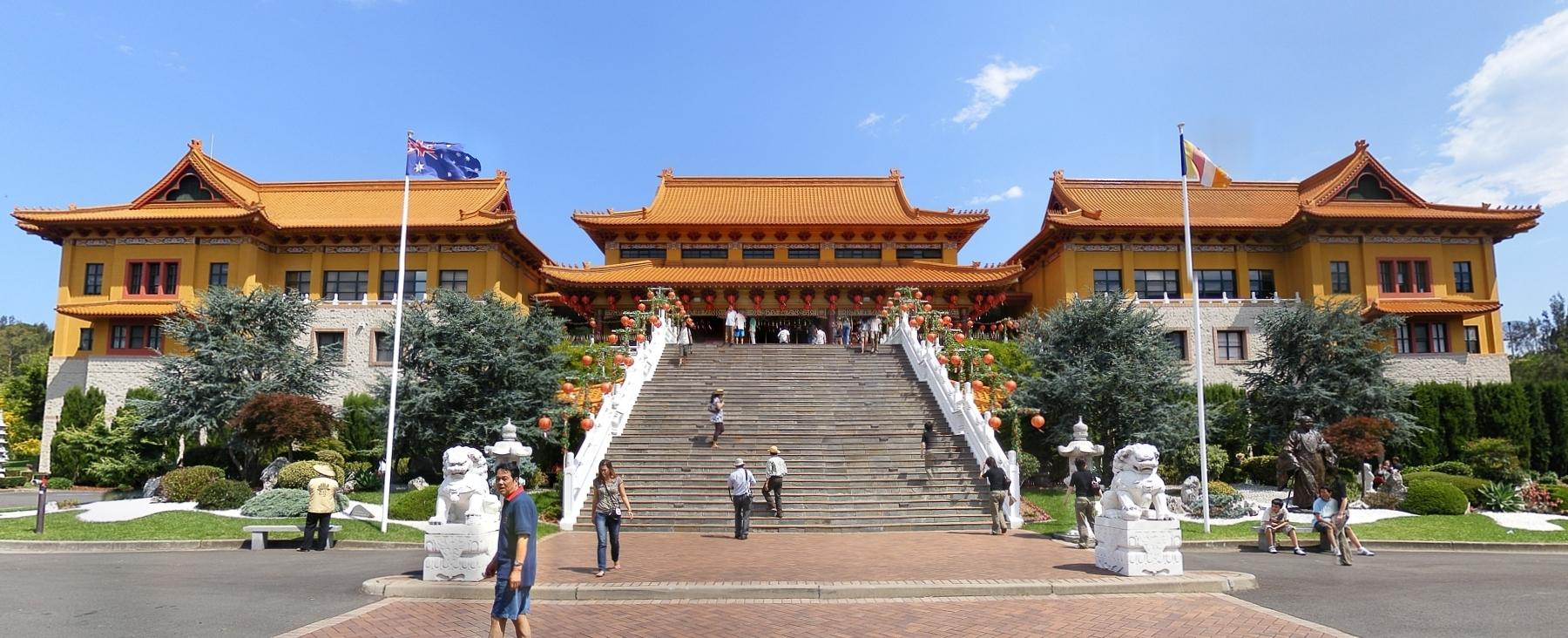
Nan Tien Temple of Fo Guang Shan Chinese Buddhism, in Wollongong

Buddhists began arriving in Australia in significant numbers during the goldrush of the 1850s with an influx of Chinese miners. However, the population remained low until the 1960s. Buddhism is now one of the fastest growing religions in Australia. Immigration from Asia has contributed to this, but some people of non-Asian origin have also converted. The three main traditions of Buddhism—Theravada, East Asian and Tibetan—are now represented in Australia. According to the 2021 census, Buddhism has 615,800 adherents: 2.4% of the total population.

Buddhist temples can be very active. Quang Minh Temple in Braybrook, Melbourne, Victoria gets about 2,000 people through every Sunday and gives a free vegetarian meal to about 600 people. For important events, more than 20,000 people come. Even more come to the Nan Tien Temple, or "Southern Paradise Temple", in Wollongong, New South Wales, began construction in the early 1990s, adopting the Chinese palace building style and is now the largest Buddhist temple in the Southern Hemisphere. This temple follows the Venerable Master Hsing Yun of the Fo Guang Shan Buddhist order. Bodhinyana Monastery is a Theravadin Buddhist monastery in the Thai Forest Tradition located in Serpentine, Western Australia.

=== Sikhism ===
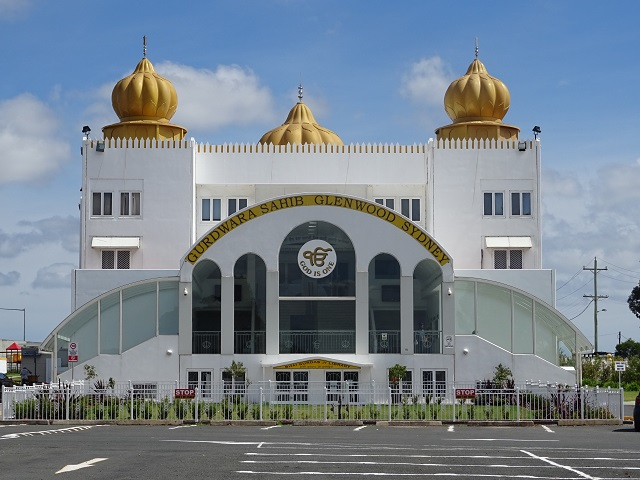
Sri Guru Singh Sabha Gurudwara (Temple), Glenwood, New South Wales

Sikhism has been one of the fastest growing religions in Australia in recent years. According to census data, Australia's Sikh population grew from 72,000 to 210,400 between 2011 and 2021, an average growth rate of 14.8% per year. Around 42% of Australia's Sikhs live in the state of Victoria.

=== Jainism ===
Jainism is currently the fourth fastest growing religion in Australia, recording 4,050 adherents in 2016 and growing an average of 7.7% per year. The overwhelming majority (94.7%) of Jains live inside the state capitals, primarily Sydney, Melbourne and Perth.

== Traditional religions ==
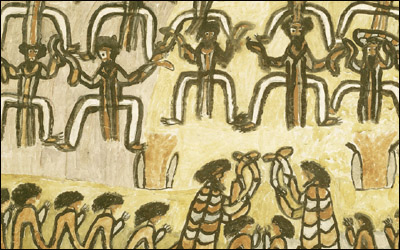
Illustration of an Aboriginal corroboree ceremony by William Barak c. 1898

Dreaming (spirituality)—the Dreaming or Dreaming—places significant emphasis on belonging to the land. It is at once a collection of stories of an ancient view of creation and present day Dreaming (spirituality). It shaped and continues to shape Aboriginal law and customs; and Aboriginal art, story and dance continue to draw on these spiritual traditions.

There were a great many different nations, each with their own individual culture, belief structure, and language. The Rainbow Serpent is a major dream spirit for Aboriginal people across Australia. The Yowie and Bunyip are other well known dream spirits. At the time of the British settlement, traditional religions were animist and tended to have elements of ancestor worship.

Aboriginal beliefs and spirituality, even among those Aboriginal peoples who identify themselves as members of a traditional organised religion, are intrinsically linked to the land generally and to certain sites of significance in particular. As Mircea Eliade put it, "There is a general belief among the [indigenous] Australians that the world, man, and the various animals and plants were created by certain Supernatural beings who afterwards disappeared, either ascending to the sky or entering the earth." There were and still are ritual systems, with an emphasis on life transitions such as adulthood and death.

The spirituality and customs of Torres Strait Islanders, who inhabit the islands between Australia and New Guinea, reflected their Melanesian origins and dependence on the sea.

=== Since British settlement ===
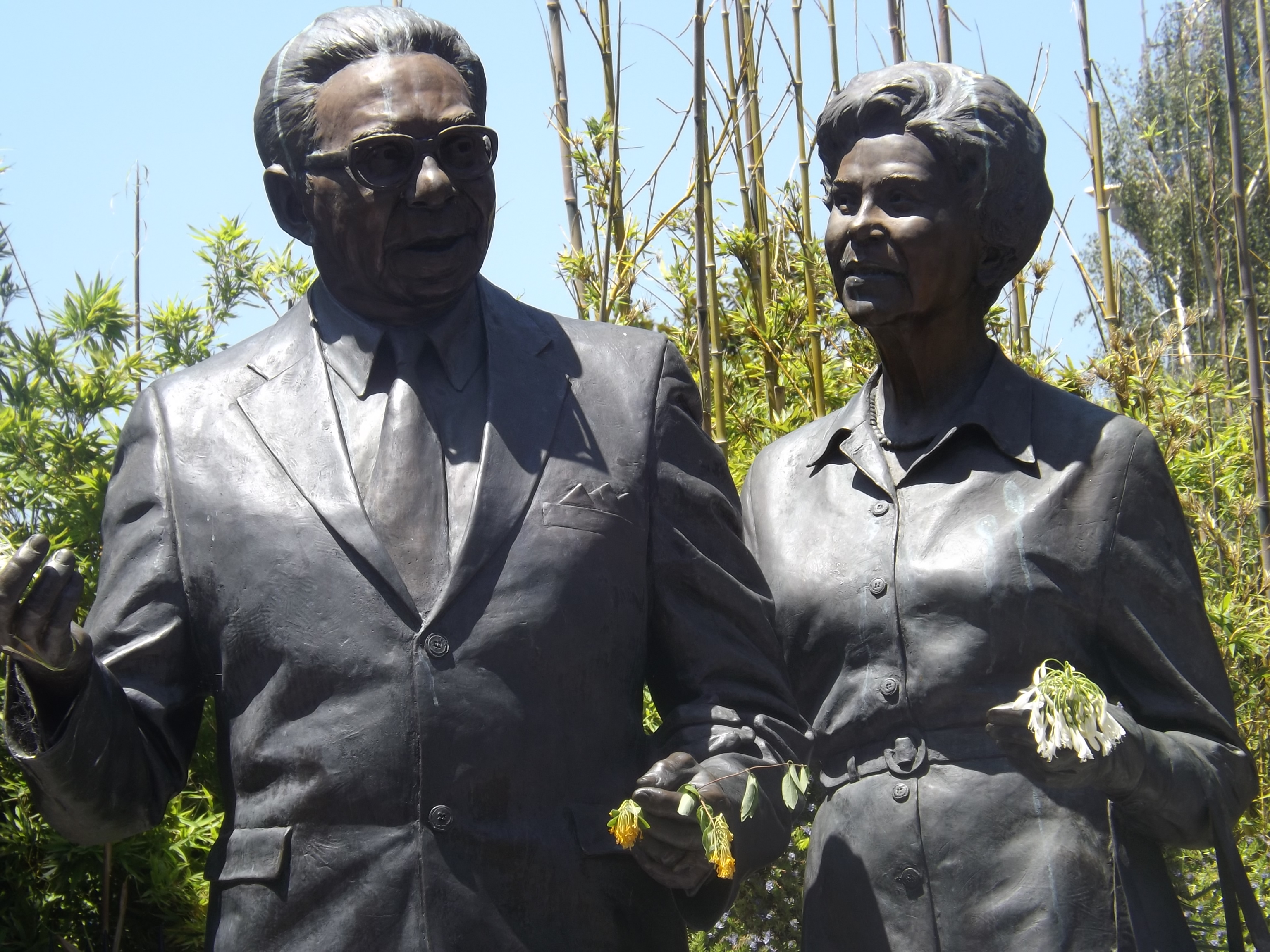
Statue of Christian pastor, Aboriginal activist and former Governor of South Australia, Sir Douglas Nicholls

European culture and Christianity have had a significant impact on Indigenous Australians. As in many colonial situations the churches both facilitated the loss of Indigenous Australian culture and religion and also facilitated its maintenance. The involvement of Christians in Aboriginal affairs has evolved significantly since 1788. Around the year 2000, many churches and church organisations officially apologised for past failures to adequately respect indigenous cultures and address the injustices of the dispossession of indigenous people.

In the Torres Strait Islands, the Coming of the Light Festival marks the day the Christian missionaries first arrived on the islands on 1 July 1871 and introduced Christianity to the region. This is a significant festival for Torres Strait Islanders, who are predominantly Christian. Religious and cultural ceremonies are held across Torres Strait and mainland Australia.

Prominent Aboriginal activist Noel Pearson, himself raised at a Lutheran mission in Cape York, has written that missions throughout Australia's colonial history "provided a haven from the hell of life on the Australian frontier while at the same time facilitating colonisation". Prominent Aboriginal Christians have included Pastor David Unaipon, the first Aboriginal author; Pastor Sir Douglas Nicholls, athlete, activist and former Governor of South Australia; Mum (Shirl) Smith, a celebrated Redfern community worker who, assisted by the Sisters of Charity, work to assist Aboriginal peoples.; and former Senator Aden Ridgeway, the first Chairman of the Aboriginal Catholic Ministry. In recent times, Christians such as Fr Ted Kennedy of Redfern, Jesuit human rights lawyer Fr Frank Brennan and the Josephite Sisters have been prominent in working for Aboriginal rights and improvements to standards of living.

== Other religions ==
The 2006 census shows 53 listed groups down to 5000 members, most of them Christian denominations, many of them national versions such as Greek, Serbian Orthodox and Assyrian Orthodox. Of the smaller religions, pagan religions 29,328, the Baháʼí Faith at 12,000, humanism about 7000. Between 1000 and 5000 are: Taoism, Druse, Satanism, Zoroastrian, rationalism, Creativity, Theosophy, Jainism. There are also adherents of Tenrikyo, Shinto, Unitarian Universalism, Eckankar, Cao Dai, Rastafari, pantheism, Scientology and Raelianism.

In general, non-Christian religions and those with no religion have been growing in proportion to the overall population. With fewer classifications, data from 1996 and 2001 showed Aboriginal religion decreasing from 7000 to 5000 while Baháʼí grew from just under 9,000 to over 11,000 and the rest of the "Other" category growing from about 69,000 to about 92,000.

=== Paganism ===
The early history of Australian paganism is obscure. Theosophists and spiritualists arrived in Australia in the late 1800s and early 1900s. The Ordo Templi Orientis (OTO) had a lodge in Sydney from 1912 until the late 1920s, which was revived in 1982. In late 1960s and 1970s both Melbourne and Sydney saw various occult orders influenced by Western magical traditions, British occultism, and figures like Aleister Crowley however these groups were mostly small and secretive.

When exactly witchcraft arrived in Australia is a matter of debate however it’s commonly accepted that Alexandrian Wiccans and Gardnerian Wiccans arrived in Australia from England and the United States around the late 1960s.

In the 2001 Australian census, 24,157 people identified with a pagan religion, representing 0.12% of the population. This included 10,632 pagans, 8,755 Wiccans, 2,225 nature religion adherents, 1,085 pantheists, 763 animists, and 697 druids.

Comparatively, there are slightly more pagans in Australia than Brethren, ten times more than Scientologists, and half the number of Seventh Day Adventists or Mormons, making paganism a significant minority religion. Professor Douglas Ezzy suspects that 2001 census underestimates the number of pagans, especially among teenagers whose parents may not have reported their pagan beliefs due to the stigma associated with terms like “Witch”; many any who identified as “pagan” on the census might identify as “Witch” in private.

The 2001 census (and following censuses) also showed that women dominate Australian paganism, with 63% being female. The religion in Australia with the highest proportion of females to males is Wicca, with only 26 males for every 100 females, compared to the national ratio of 97 males for every 100 females.

In the 2011 census, 32,083 Australians identified their religion as a pagan religion including 8,413 people who identified their religion as Wicca or Neopagan witchcraft.

In the 2016 census, 27,194 Australians identified as pagan or other affiliated "nature religions" including 6,616 people who identified their religion as Wicca or Neopagan witchcraft.

In the 2021 census, 33,142 Australians identified their religion as nature religion including 18,630 as pagan and 7,785 as Wicca or neopagan witchcraft.

In 2021, the Adelaide University Occult Club, a student club at the University of Adelaide, faced challenges in securing funding and access to campus facilities from student union, YouX due to a delay in reregistering the club. The pagan club with multiple other clubs signed an open letter to the clubs committee. In 2022, controversy the club was reregistration was denied during an in camera decision; rejection of registration was complaint over the club might summon Satan.

In 2024, Sacred Grove Society, student club for pagans at Flinders University was formed; Flinders University used to have the pagan club from 1998 to 2008, Flinders University Pagan Association used to produce a club newsletter called The Grimoire and host a radio show called The Elements on student radio.

Other university pagan clubs of the 2000s in Australia include Pagans and Gnostics of the University of Sydney, Monash University's Alternative Spiritualities Club, and University of Western Australia's Pagan Network.

Australia inherited its witchcraft laws from British colonial rule, specifically the Witchcraft Act 1735, was repealed in 1951. Australian witchcraft laws were gradually phased out in Australia, with New South Wales being the first state to repeal them in 1969. South Australia followed in 1991, Queensland in 2000, and Victoria in 2005.

== Irreligion ==
=== Non-religious ===
Australia is one of the least religious nations in the developed world, with religion not described as a central part in many people's lives. This view is prominent among Australia's youth, who were ranked as the least religious worldwide in a 2008 survey conducted by The Christian Science Monitor. In the 2021 census, the ABS categorised ~9,887,000 Australians (38.9%) as having no religion, up 16.6% in real terms from 4,796,800 (22.3%) in 2011. This category includes agnosticism, atheism, humanism, rationalism, and people who are unaffiliated with any particular religion.

=== Atheism ===
While people with no religion are more than 30% of the Australian population, the Australian Bureau of Statistics does not provide information in the annual "1301.0 – Year Book Australia" on religious affiliation as to how many people fall into each sub-category. Data on religious affiliation is only collected by the ABS at the five yearly population census. Atheist interests in Australia are represented nationally by the Atheist Foundation of Australia. Humanist interests in Australia are represented nationally by the Council of Australian Humanist Societies. Rationalist interests in Australia are represented nationally by the Rationalist Society of Australia. The Global Atheist Convention, a prominent atheist event, has been held in Melbourne.

== Religion and the law ==
=== Constitutional status ===
Section 116 of the Constitution of Australia provides that:

The Commonwealth shall not make any law for establishing any religion, or for imposing any religious observance, or for prohibiting the free exercise of any religion, and no religious test shall be required as a qualification for any office or public trust under the Commonwealth.

The section has not been relied upon successfully to overturn an act of Parliament, and whilst it has been subject of decisions by the High Court of Australia it is generally recognised in academic literature to have been interpreted narrowly.

In practice, though, federal governments have respected Section 116 and generally allowed the free practice of religions. Australia does not have explicit "separation of church and state"—the essence of a "secular state"—in the sense that countries like the USA do. In view of Section 116 of Australia's constitution ("The Commonwealth shall not make any law for establishing any religion, or for imposing any religious observance ..."), it is commonly believed that Australia is already a "secular state". This is a misconception: in 1981, the High Court determined that there is in fact no constitutional separation of church and state in Australia. However, there is no general "mood" to legislate establishment of religions.

=== Other interactions ===
In 1983, the High Court of Australia defined religion as "a complex of beliefs and practices which point to a set of values and an understanding of the meaning of existence". The Australian Bureau of Statistics 2001 Census Dictionary defines "no religion" as a category of religion which includes subcategories such as agnosticism, atheism, humanism and rationalism (but the ABS also categorises these as "secular beliefs").

The Human Rights and Equal Opportunity Commission (HREOC) is able to inquire into allegations of discrimination on religious grounds.

In 1998 the HREOC addressed the right to freedom of religion and belief in Australia against article 18 of the International Covenant on Civil and Political Rights, stating that "despite the legal protections that apply in different jurisdictions, many Australians suffer discrimination on the basis of religious belief or non-belief, including members of both mainstream and non-mainstream religions, and those of no religious persuasion." An example of an HREOC response to such views is the IsmaU project, which examines possible prejudice against Muslims in Australia since the 11 September 2001 attacks in the US and the Bali bombings.

== Interfaith efforts ==
Interfaith efforts between various religious institutions occur. Since the early 2000s, the Abraham Conference convenes as an annual interfaith event between Christians, Muslims, and Jews.

== See also ==
- A Practical Reference to Religious Diversity for Operational Police and Emergency Services
- Australian Association for Jewish Studies
- Broken Rites and Catholic Church sexual abuse cases in Australia
- Freedom of religion in Australia
- National Church Life Survey
- Royal Commission into Institutional Responses to Child Sexual Abuse
- Separation of church and state in Australia
- Stolen Generations
