= Hohola Mosque =

Mosque in Port Moresby, National Capital, Papua New Guinea

- Location of the mosque in Papua New Guinea

Religion
- Affiliation: Sunni Islam
- Ecclesiastical or organisational status: Mosque
- Status: Active

Location
- Location: Port Moresby, National Capital
- Country: Papua New Guinea
- Coordinates: 9°27′30.6″S 147°10′38.1″E

Architecture
- Type: Mosque architecture
- Funded by: Government of Malaysia; Government of Saudi Arabia
- Groundbreaking: 2004
- Completed: 2007

The Hohola Mosque is a Sunni Islam mosque in the National Capital District of Port Moresby, Papua New Guinea. It is the first mosque in the country. Construction began in 2001 following a land donation by the Papua New Guinea government and was completed in 2007.

The project received financial support from Malaysia, Saudi Arabia and Islamic organisations in Indonesia. The mosque serves as the headquarters of the Islamic Society of Papua New Guinea and an important centre for the country's Muslim community. In November 2018, Malaysian Prime Minister Mahathir Mohamad visited the mosque during his visit to Papua New Guinea for the APEC summit.

== History ==
The construction of the mosque began in 2001, following a land donation from the government to a local Islamic community. The building construction started in 2004 and was completed in 2007, and was the first mosque established in the country. Much of the mosque's funding came from Malaysia and Saudi Arabia. In 2018, Malaysian Prime Minister Mahathir Mohamad visited the mosque after attending the Asia-Pacific Economic Cooperation (APEC) conference.

According to Malaysia's foreign minister, Saifuddin Abdullah, the land was originally offered to Malaysian prime minister Mahathir Mohamad to establish the first mosque in Papua New Guinea, and Mahathir was instrumental in its construction in 2001. Mahathir declined to have it built by him or named after him and proposed that the Islamic Society of Papua New Guinea build it instead. The Borneo Post described the Hohola Mosque as the country's first purpose-built mosque. An Ahmadiyya mosque in Kimbe, New Britain, is reported to date from 1988. Muslims make up a small minority in Papua New Guinea, numbering under 500 in 2001 and around 10,000 by 2021.

== See also ==
- Islam in Papua New Guinea
- List of mosques in Oceania
