= Port Vila Grand Mosque =

Mosque in Port Vila, Vanuatu

Religion
- Affiliation: Sunni Islam
- Ecclesiastical or organizational status: Mosque
- Status: Active

Location
- Location: Port Vila, Vanuatu

Architecture
- Type: Mosque architecture
- Established: 1992

The Port Vila Grand Mosque is a Sunni Islam mosque in Port Vila, the capital of Vanuatu.

== History ==
The mosque had been established and completed in 1992 by the Mele Muslims. It was also the first mosque built in Vanuatu.

== See also ==
- Islam in Vanuatu
- List of mosques in Oceania
