= Hanifa Mosque =

Mosque in Nadroga-Navosa, Fiji

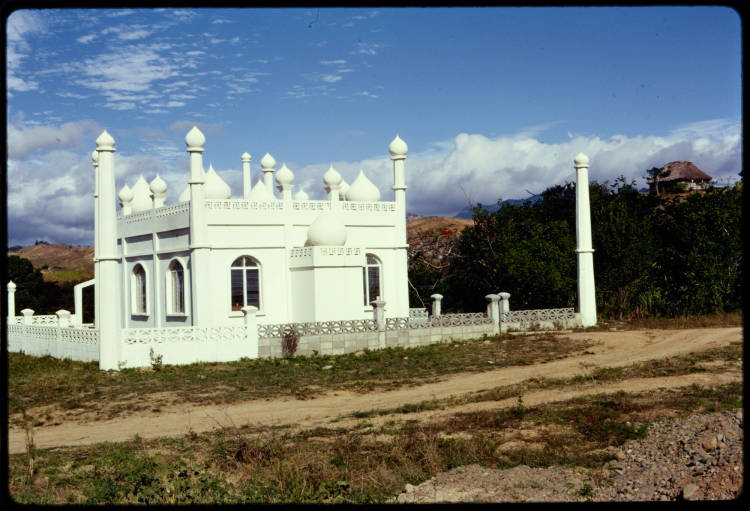

- Location of the mosque in Fiji

Religion
- Affiliation: Sunni Islam
- Sect: Hanafi
- Ecclesiastical or organizational status: Mosque
- Status: Active

Location
- Location: Queens Road, Nadroga-Navosa, Viti Levu
- Country: Fiji
- Interactive map of Hanifa Mosque
- Coordinates: 17°51′23″S 177°21′38″E

Architecture
- Type: Mosque
- Funded by: Bobby Khan
- General contractor: Western Home Limited
- Established: 1990s
- Groundbreaking: 2020
- Completed: 2021
- Construction cost: FJ$1 million

Specifications
- Capacity: 200 worshippers
- Minaret: 2 (maybe more)

The Hanifa Mosque, also called Masjid Hanifa, is a Sunni Islam mosque, located in Nadroga-Navosa Province on Viti Levu, Fiji.

== History ==
After visiting a small 25-year-old mosque in 2019, Nadi businessman, Bobby Khan, pledged funds for construction of new mosque. Opened on 10 April 2021 at a cost of FJ$1 million, the project took approximately 18 months to complete. The mosque was named after Khan's mother, Hanifa Begum. The land where the mosque stands today was donated and built by Western Home Limited. The opening ceremony was officiated by Faiyaz Koya, the Minister for Commerce, Trade, Tourism and Transport.

== See also ==
- Islam in Fiji
- List of mosques in Fiji
