= Islam in Papua New Guinea =

Islam in Papua New Guinea is a minority religion in the predominantly Christian country, with around 10,000 followers as of 2021. Papuan Muslims are largely concentrated in Port Moresby and villages situated in the Highlands.

The majority of Muslims follow Sunni traditions. The majority of Muslims in Papua New Guinea are indigenous Papua New Guineans.

== History ==
=== 16th to 19th century ===
The history of Islam in New Guinea is obscure due to the lack of any historical sources. However, Muslim trading networks operated in and around New Guinea from the 16th to 19th centuries. More direct contact with Muslims occurred somewhere between the 17th and late 18th century when Muslim merchants from Seram arrived in the region to conduct trade. During this period, there was much contact between the Seramese merchants and the peoples of the Trans-Fly coastal region. By the middle of the 16th century, knowledge of ironworking reached New Guinea, introduced by Muslims from Maluku. Although trading contacts between the two came more infrequent as time passed, there was a continued presence of Muslim traders in the region as late as the 1870s.

There was a presence of Muslim Makassar merchants and Muslim laborers in southern Papua New Guinea in the 19th and 20th centuries but little is known of their religious practices or impact on the natives of the area. Despite centuries of contact with Muslims, there seems to have been little Islamic influence in Papua New Guinea except in certain rituals or customs among some native tribes.

=== 20th century ===
In the 1970s, the Muslim population of Papua New Guinea was estimated to be only 120. Most were expatriate workers from Africa and South Asia.

In 1982, Islam was officially recognized by the government.

In 1988, Muslims in Papua New Guinea set up the first Islamic center, with the help of a Malaysia-based Islamic organization and the Saudi Ministry of Islamic affairs. In 1996, three more Islamic centers were established, with the help of the Muslim World League. There are now seven Islamic centers in the nation. The first mosque, known as the Baitul Kareem Mosque, was built in 1988 in Kimbe, New Britain, by the Ahmadiyya Muslims.

== Present-day ==
There are pockets of Muslims around Port Moresby, in Baimuru, Daru, Marshall Lagoon, the Musa Valley and in the islands of New Britain and New Ireland. It is in the Highlands that Islam has seen the most growth.

=== Population ===
According to the 2000 National Population Census of Papua New Guinea, there are an estimated 756 Muslims in PNG, increased from 440 Muslims according to 1990 census.

In 2001, there were under 500 Muslims in PNG. In 2007, the U.S. Department of State estimated that there were about 2,000 Muslims in the country. In 2008, the Australian Broadcasting Corporation cited that there were more than 4,000 Muslims in the country, with "reports of entire villages converting at the same time." In 2012, Scott Flower estimated that there were over 5,000 Muslims, claiming a 500% increase since 2001. In 2021, the U.S. Department of State estimated that there are about 10,000 Muslims in the country.

=== Issues ===
In the past, the Papuan government was opposed to formally recognizing Islam and its institutions. To the present day, the government has threatened to ban Islam. Muslims have experienced discrimination and even violence from the Christian majority.

== See also ==
- Islam in Oceania
- Hohola Mosque
