= Auburn Gallipoli Mosque =

Mosque in Sydney, New South Wales, Australia

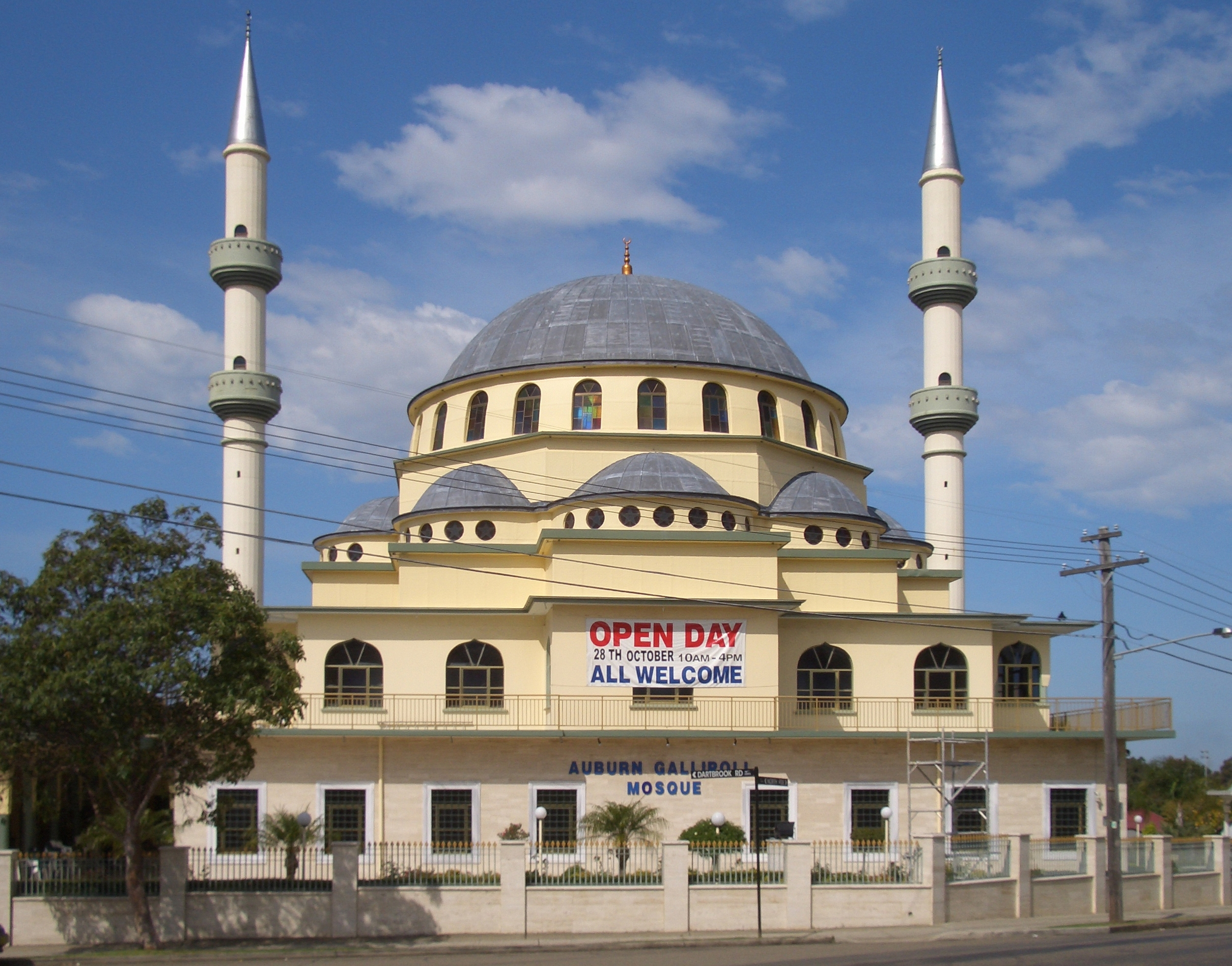
- The mosque in 2007

- Location in greater metropolitan Sydney

Religion
- Affiliation: Islam
- Rite: Sunni Islam
- Ecclesiastical or organisational status: Mosque
- Status: Active

Location
- Location: Auburn, Sydney, New South Wales
- Country: Australia
- Coordinates: 33°51′08″S 151°02′10″E

Architecture
- Architects: David G. Evans; Leyla Baydar Guven
- Type: Mosque architecture
- Style: Classical Ottoman
- Established: 1979 (as a congregation)
- Groundbreaking: 1986
- Completed: 28 November 1999
- Construction cost: A$6 million

Specifications
- Capacity: c. 2,000 worshipers
- Dome: 1
- Minaret: 2

Website
- www.gallipolimosque.org.au

The Auburn Gallipoli Mosque is an Ottoman-style mosque in Auburn, a suburb of Sydney, New South Wales, Australia. More than 500 worshippers attend every day and around 2,000 worshippers attend the weekly special Friday prayer at the Auburn Gallipoli Mosque.

== Significance and history ==
The mosque's name invokes the legacy of the Gallipoli Campaign during World War I, which played a pivotal role in the history of both Australia and the Republic of Turkey. According to mosque officials, the name is meant to signify "the shared legacy of the Australian society and the main community behind the construction of the mosque, the Australian Turkish Muslim Community." The Auburn Gallipoli Mosque is based on the design of the Marmara University Faculty of Theology mosque in Istanbul, Turkey.

The first mosque on the present mosque site was opened for worship on 3 November 1979. It was a house with internal walls removed to generate open space. The construction of the present mosque structure began in 1986. Its construction and external finishes were completed and officially opened on 28 November 1999, twenty years after the first opening.

On 10 December 2005, during an official visit to Australia, Recep Tayyip Erdoğan, the then Turkish Prime Minister, attended the Auburn Gallipoli Mosque's Friday sermon and prayed among worshippers.

As part of the mosque property is a playground built for small children, a community hall that can be hired out for events and is used for their weekly youth group and a gym. Next door to the mosque is the Gallipoli Home; a purpose-built aged care home catered to the Turkish and Muslim community in the area. There is also a Saturday Turkish language and cultural class held in the community hall for young Turkish Australians.

== See also ==
- Islam in Australia
- List of mosques in Oceania
