= List of mosques in Oceania =

This is an incomplete list of mosques in Oceania.

== Fiji ==
- Hanifa Mosque, Nadroga-Navosa Province
- Lautoka Jame Masjid, Lautoka, Ba Province
- Masjid-Ul-Hilaal, Lautoka, Ba Province
- Toorak Jame Masjid, Suva, Rewa Province
- Maigania Masjid, Miegunyah, Nadi, Ba Province
- Mosque in Nawajikuma, Nadi, Ba Province

=== Ahmadiyya ===
There are at least seven Ahmadiyya mosques in Fiji.

Name	City	Notes
Aqsa Mosque	Nadi	
Baitul Jame Mosque	Taveuni	
Fazle Umar Mosque	Suva	
Mahmood Mosque	Suva	
Mubarak Mosque	Suva	
Noor Mosque	Seaqaqa	
Rizwan Mosque	Lautoka	

=== Non-denominational ===
There are at least four non-denominational mosques in Fiji.

Name	City	Notes
Malamala Markaz	Nalovo	
Momi Masjid	Nadi	
Nadi Airport Mosque	Nadi	Located in Nadi Airport
Nalovo Markaz	Nalovo	

== Guam ==
The following is a list of mosques in Guam, United States.

Island	Village	Name	Images	Year	Group	Remarks
Guam	Mangilao	An-Noor Mosque		2000		Guam's only mosque

== Marshall Islands ==
The following is a list of mosques in the Marshall Islands.

Island	City	Urban area	Name	Images	Year	Group	Remarks
Majuro Atoll	Majuro	Delap-Uliga-Djarrit	Baet-Ul-Ahad Mosque		2012	Ahmadiyya	

== New Caledonia ==
The following is a list of mosques in New Caledonia.

Island	Commune	District	Name	Images	Year	Group	Remarks
Grande Terre	Bourail	Nessadiou	Centre Islamique de Bourail		1998		
			Islamic Center of Nouméa				

== Papua New Guinea ==
Region	City	Suburb	Name	Images	Year	Group	Remarks
Papua	Port Moresby	Hohola	Hohola Mosque		2007		
			Al Hidaya Islamic Centre				

== Samoa ==
Name	Images	Year	Group	Remarks
Mariam Mosque				The only Mosque In Samoa Country

== Solomon Islands ==
Island	City	Name	Images	Year	Group	Remarks
Guadalcanal	Honiara	Mbokonavera Masjid				
East Kola'a Ridge		Ahmadiya Centre				

== Tonga ==
Island	City	Name	Images	Year	Group	Remarks
Tongatapu	Nukuʻalofa	Al-Khadeejah Mosque		2010		

== Tuvalu ==
Island	City	Name	Images	Year	Group	Remarks
Funafuti	Funafuti	Ahmaddiya Tuvalu Mosque			Ahmadiyya	Tuvalu's only mosque

== Vanuatu ==
Island	City	Name	Images	Year	Group	Remarks
Efate	Port Vila	Port Vila Grand Mosque		1992	Sunni	Vanuatu's first mosque
Tanna		Ewel Mosque				

== See also ==
- Islamic organisations in Australia
- Islam in Oceania
