= Islam in Vanuatu =

The earliest known Muslim in Vanuatu was Henry Hussein Nabanga, who converted to Islam while in India in 1978. By the time of his death the country's first mosque, Port Vila Grand Mosque, was completed. Islam was spread across the islands of Vanuatu by Mohammed Lawal Amadu. There are currently 500 to 1,000 Muslims in Vanuatu.

== History ==
Islam was not present in Vanuatu until the 1970s. In 1973, Henry Hussein Nabanga went to India after responding to a Catholic religious training course advertisement. While in India he converted to Islam in 1978, and he was the only indigenous Muslim in Vanuatu for a decade. He proselytized and converted a few members of his family on Imere Tenuku island before his death in 1993. Mohammed Lawal Amadu, a Nigerian who lived in Port Vila from 1995 to 2007, spread Islam to other islands in Vanuatu.

In 2004, Franco Zocca reported less than 100 Muslims in Vanuatu. The Sydney Morning Herald reported 100 to 200 Muslims in Vanuatu in 2007. Abdul Karim and Sheikh Mustapha, imams in Vanuatu, reported less than 500 Muslims in the country in 2017, with 110 of these people being on Tanna. In 2016, Mohammed Siddiq Sambo claims that there are over 1,000 Muslims in Vanuatu, but these numbers were disputed.

Chiefs are the target of conversion as converting a chief would result in their extended family, clan, and islanders to convert to Islam as well. Conversion to Islam increased after Cyclone Pam hit the islands in 2015.

== Places of worship ==
A prayer hall was established in Mele in 1992. The Port Vila Grand Mosque, the first mosque in Vanuatu, opened in 1992.

== See also ==
- Religion in Vanuatu
- Islam by country
- Port Vila Grand Mosque

== Works cited ==
=== Journals ===
- Tabani, Marc (2021). "Constructions of Cultural (In)Compatibility Islam as kastom in Tanna (Vanuatu)". Paideuma. 67. Frobenius Institute: 63–90. JSTOR 27141187.

=== News ===
- "Heeding the call to prayer in a region that reveres the pig". The Sydney Morning Herald. 8 September 2007. Archived from the original on 3 March 2024.
- Garae, Len (27 October 2016). "Over 1,000 Muslims". Vanuatu Daily Post. Archived from the original on 9 July 2025.
- Mwai, Nicholas (15 May 2014). "Vanuatu Muslim Centre Celebrates its First Open Day". Vanuatu Daily Post. Archived from the original on 9 July 2025.

== Furthur reading ==
- Tabani, Marc (2020). "Islam of Tannese Muslims (Vanuatu)". L'Homme - Revue française d'anthropologie (233): 105. doi:10.4000/lhomme.36746.
- "Vanuatu pastor wants to keep Islam out - ABC Pacific". ABC Pacific. 26 October 2016. Archived from the original on 2025-10-04.
- "Muslim Vanuatu, Semangat Islam di Tengah Keterbatasan (4-habis) |Republika Online". Republika Online (in Indonesian). Archived from the original on 2025-10-04.
- "Muslim Vanuatu, Semangat Islam di Tengah Keterbatasan (3) |Republika Online". Republika Online (in Indonesian). Archived from the original on 2025-10-04.
- "Semangat Beribadah Muslim Vanuatu di Tengah Keterbatasan |Republika Online". Republika Online (in Indonesian). Archived from the original on 2025-10-04.
- Ahmadu, Mohammed L.; Shuaibu, Zainab M. (2004). A Short Introduction to Islam and Muslims in Vanuatu. Regional Islamic Dawah Council of South East Asia and the Pacific (RISEAP).
- Flower, Scott (2016-08-12). Islam and Cultural Change in Papua New Guinea. Taylor & Francis. pp. 15–7. ISBN 978-1-317-68084-0.
- Tabani, Marc (February 2019). The indigenization of Islam Tanna (Vanuatu). Kolloquium zu laufenden Forschungsarbeiten, Frobenius Institut, Goethe Universität. Frankfurt, Germany: HAL. hal-02178818.
