= Lautoka Jame Masjid =

Mosque in Lautoka, Ba, Fiji

Lautoka Jame Mosque
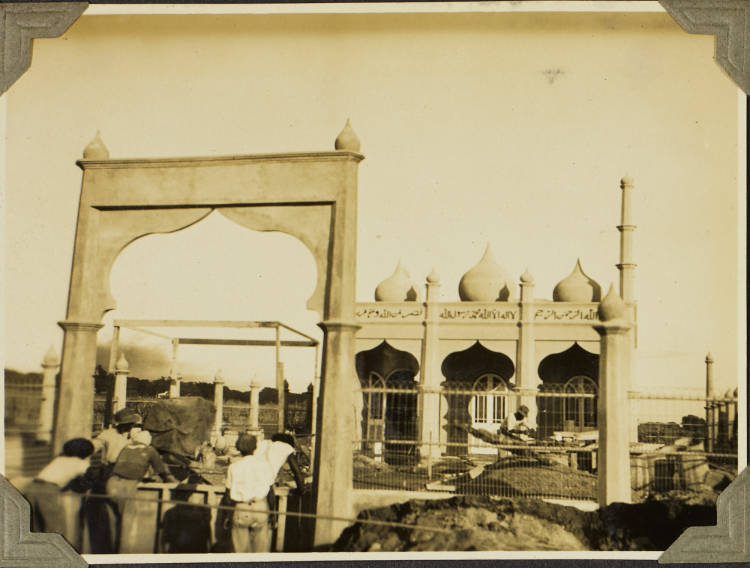
- The mosque in 1928

- Location of the mosque in Fiji

Religion
- Affiliation: Sunni Islam
- Sect: Hanafi
- Ecclesiastical or organisational status: Mosque
- Status: Active

Location
- Location: 1 Mana St, Lautoka, Ba Province, Western Division
- Country: Fiji
- Interactive map of Lautoka Jame Mosque
- Coordinates: 17°36′22″S 177°27′18″E

Architecture
- Type: Mosque
- Established: c. 1928
- Completed: 2019
- Construction cost: NZ$1.5 million

Specifications
- Capacity: 4,000 worshippers
- Dome: 3
- Minaret: Many (more than 10)
- Materials: White marble

The Lautoka Jame Masjid, also known as the Lautoka Jamia Masjid, is a Sunni Islam mosque, located in Lautoka, in the Ba Province, in the Western Division of Fiji.

== Overview ==
In 1928, it was captured that a mosque was under construction in Lautoka.

The current building, Fiji's largest mosque, is a three storey building, completed in 2019, that caters for 4,000 worshippers. It is known for its arched doors and white marble structure.

Musa Vali Suleman Patel, served as imam of the mosque for nearly 30 years. Patel was murdered in the 2019 Christchurch mosque shootings, in New Zealand. In 2020, Jacinda Ardern, the Prime Minister of New Zealand, visited the mosque and, as part of a ceremony, unveiled a plaque in honour of Patel and the other two Fijians killed in the Christchurch shooting.

== See also ==
- Islam in Fiji
- List of mosques in Fiji
