= Abraham Conference =

The Abraham Conference is an annual interfaith conference held in Australia and organised by the Affinity Intercultural Foundation in partnership with religious associations in Australia from the Christian, Islamic, and Jewish communities in Australia.

The conference was founded in the early 2000s. Due to the difficulty in managing complex interfaith relations between the Christian, Muslim and Jewish communities in Australia, the size and complexity of the conference proceedings have varied over the years. In some years, the conference proceedings involved multi-day events, hosted at various Australian universities, and featured prominent speakers from Australia and overseas. In other years when the effort was deemed to difficult, the conference was downscaled with fewer partnering groups. The conference partner organisations include the Affinity Intercultural Foundation, Australian-Egyptian Forum Council, Columban Centre for Christian-Muslim Relations, NSW Jewish Board of Deputies, and the Uniting Church in Australia (UCA). The original founding body of the conference was the Australian Intercultural Society (AIS), based in Melbourne, which was founded in 2000. After the inaugural Abraham Conference, the Affinity Intercultural Foundation (AIF) was founding in 2001 in Sydney. The AIF and the AIS jointly began working on the conference as well as other intercultural events.

In 2021, the Abraham Conference theme focused on the positive role of women in the Abrahamic traditions. The featured presentations focused on recovering some of the lost traditions of inspiring women leaders in the Abraham religions and their contributions made in their time.
