= Secular Zionism =

Secular variant of Zionism

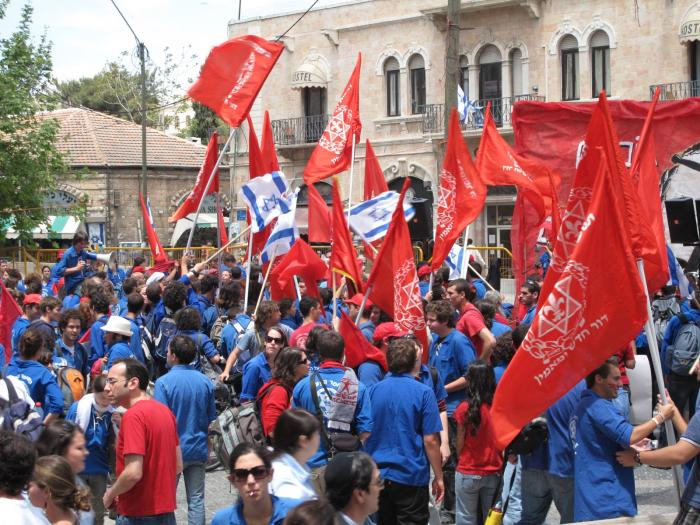
The secular Zionist movement Hashomer Hatzair, Jerusalem, 2009

Secular Zionism is a variant of Zionism that advocates for the establishment and development of a Jewish homeland—primarily in Land of Israel—on the basis of Jewish national identity, culture, and history, rather than religious belief or theological justification. Secular Zionism prioritizes human agency, maintaining that the security, development, and success of the Jewish state depend primarily on the actions and efforts of the Jewish people themselves, rather than on divine intervention. Secular Zionism saw itself as bringing Jews into the modern world by redefining what it means to be Jewish in terms of identification with a sovereign state, rather than Judaic faith and tradition.

Secular Zionism emerged in the late 19th century and is commonly associated with thinkers such as Theodor Herzl, who articulated the movement in largely political and secular terms. The emergence of modern Zionism was primarily secular in nature and developed within the framework of political philosophy. Secular Zionism has been described as a modern nationalist movement, but it has been internally divided over its aims and character. A key distinction is often drawn between political Zionism, associated with Theodor Herzl, which emphasized statehood and diplomatic solutions to antisemitism, and cultural Zionism, associated with Ahad Ha'am, which prioritized the revival of Jewish culture and identity.

Some accounts note that certain strands of secular Zionism adopted critical or dismissive attitudes toward traditional Judaism, viewing it as incompatible with modern nationalist ideals. At the same time, other strands sought to reinterpret or preserve elements of Jewish tradition within a secular cultural framework. However, Zionism still emerged as a largely secular nationalist movement, with many of its leading proponents identifying as non-religious or atheist, and has therefore at times been also referred to as atheist Zionism. Support for Israel has been expressed by a range of secular figures across the political spectrum, including both conservative and liberal commentators.

== History ==
=== Early origins ===
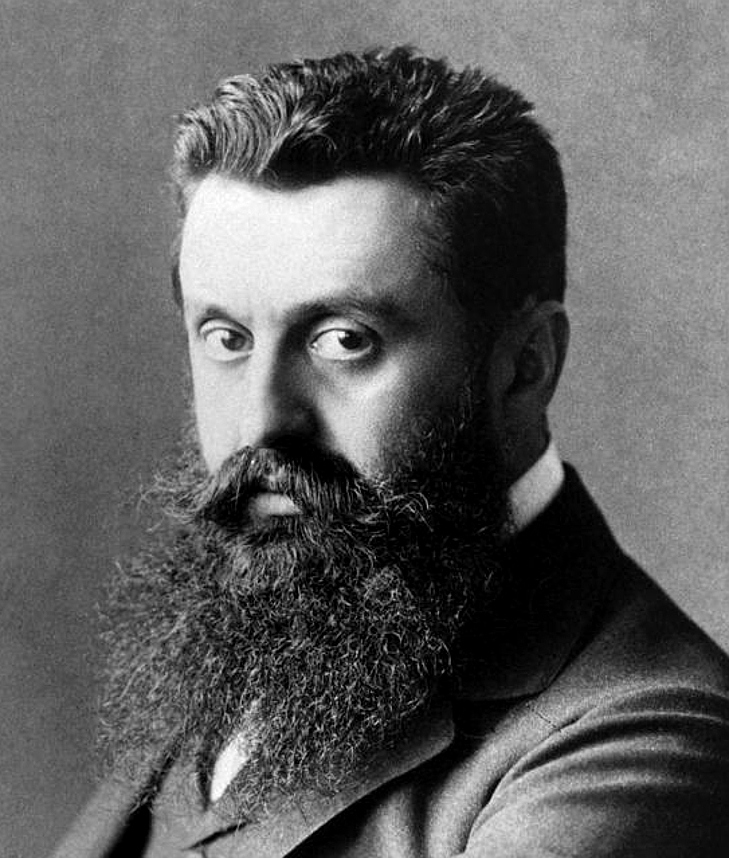
Theodor Herzl, founder of political Zionism, is commonly associated with secular Zionism, emphasizing Jewish national identity and statehood over religious doctrine.

During the Egypt–Syria campaign of the French Revolutionary Wars, Napoleon I, who was secular, invited "all the Jews of Asia and Africa to gather under his flag in order to re-establish the ancient Jerusalem," an idea associated with Jacobin thought that may have originated with Thomas Corbet (1773–1804), an Anglo-Irish Protestant.

Some commentary describes early secular Zionism as emerging in the late 19th century as a political response to antisemitism in Europe, emphasizing practical state-building over religious motivation. It highlights the role of Theodor Herzl, a largely secular intellectual, whose 1896 work Der Judenstaat framed the "Jewish question" in political terms and proposed the establishment of a Jewish state as a pragmatic solution. According to this perspective, Herzl's approach reflected contemporary European nationalist movements, prioritizing diplomacy, international recognition, and territorial sovereignty rather than religious or theological claims.

This interpretation further emphasizes Herzl's role in institutionalizing the movement through the convening of the First Zionist Congress, which led to the establishment of the World Zionist Organization and the articulation of a coordinated political program. It also notes his efforts to gain support from major powers, including outreach to the German and Ottoman leadership, as well as the consideration of alternative territorial proposals such as the Uganda Plan of 1903. These elements are presented as evidence of a pragmatic and largely secular orientation in the early development of the movement.

Jewish thinker and essayist Ahad Ha'am initially saw problems in Judaism and sought out ways to revitalize the religious community and the religion itself to regenerate interest in Judaism's adherents, especially its youth. He saw nationalism as a way to reconnect Jews to Judaism, putting forth ideas of creating settlements in the Land of Israel filled with well-versed Hebrew-speakers and a core adherence to Judaism. He saw the land of Israel and the Hebrew language as integral parts of the Jewish national heritage, and not necessarily of religious significance. Urban, upper class Moroccan Jews were divided on the question of Zionism: some supported modern secular Zionism, but some who were invested in the project of Westernization saw Zionism as an obstacle to achieving assimilation and integration with the Europeans.

=== Foundations of secular Zionism ===
In this interpretation, Jewish national revival was framed in political rather than religious terms, emphasizing organized diplomacy, legal frameworks, and state-building rather than messianic expectations or the restoration of religious institutions. The movement is thus presented as rooted in nationalism and as a response to antisemitism in Europe, rather than in the fulfillment of religious prophecy. It also highlights that early proposals did not universally insist on settlement in Palestine, noting that alternatives such as the Uganda Plan were considered, reflecting a pragmatic and territorial approach to the question of a Jewish homeland. The vision for the new Jew was radically different: an individual of strong moral and aesthetic values, not shackled by religion, driven by ideals and willing to challenge degrading circumstances; a liberated, dignified person eager to defend both personal and national pride. The Zionist goal of reframing of Jewish identity in secular-nationalist terms meant primarily the decline of the status of religion in the Jewish community.

Theodor Herzl is often described as approaching Zionism from a largely secular perspective, with limited emphasis on religious belief or practice. The state he envisioned was conceived as a modern, secular nation grounded in Jewish national and ethnic identity, drawing on elements of contemporary European political models. This approach was met with opposition from some Orthodox Jewish groups, as well as from Jews who rejected the concept of Jewish nationalism and instead identified primarily with the societies in which they lived. Herzl envisioned a largely secular state in which religious authority would be limited in public affairs. In his 1896 work Der Judenstaat, he indicated that religious figures should remain within the sphere of religious institutions rather than exert influence over state governance. Between 1870 and 1897, more than 20 Jewish communities were established in Palestine, prior to the convening of the First Zionist Congress. These initiatives were undertaken by several groups, specifically Hovevei Zion, a system of local proto-Zionist associations in Eastern Europe. The movement brought together both secular and religious Jews who shared the objective of establishing a presence in the Land of Israel, and its organized and practical efforts helped lay the groundwork for later Zionist activity.

=== Ideological development ===
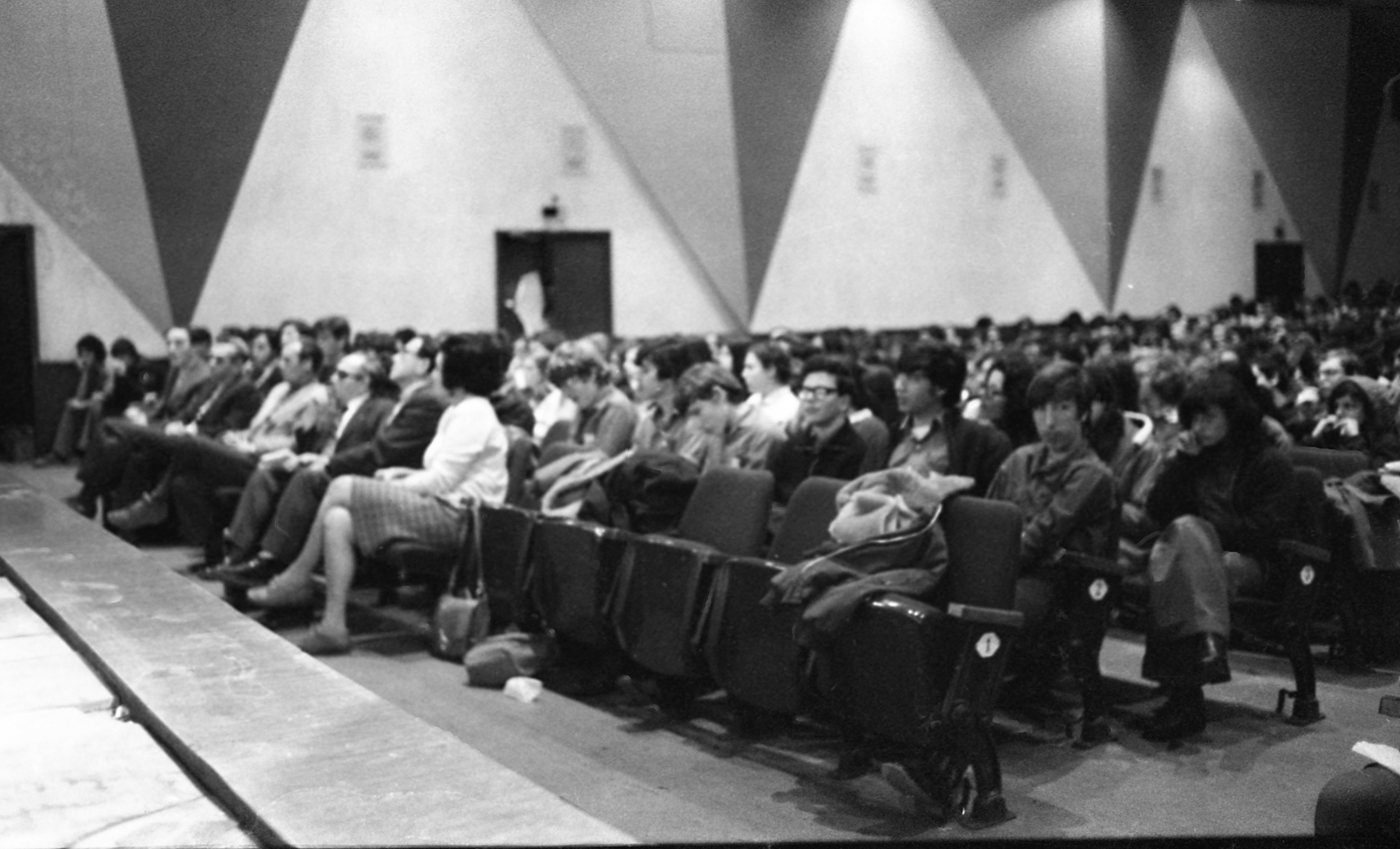
The Bridge (Gesher) organized a debate on the cooperation between religious and secular Jews, 1974

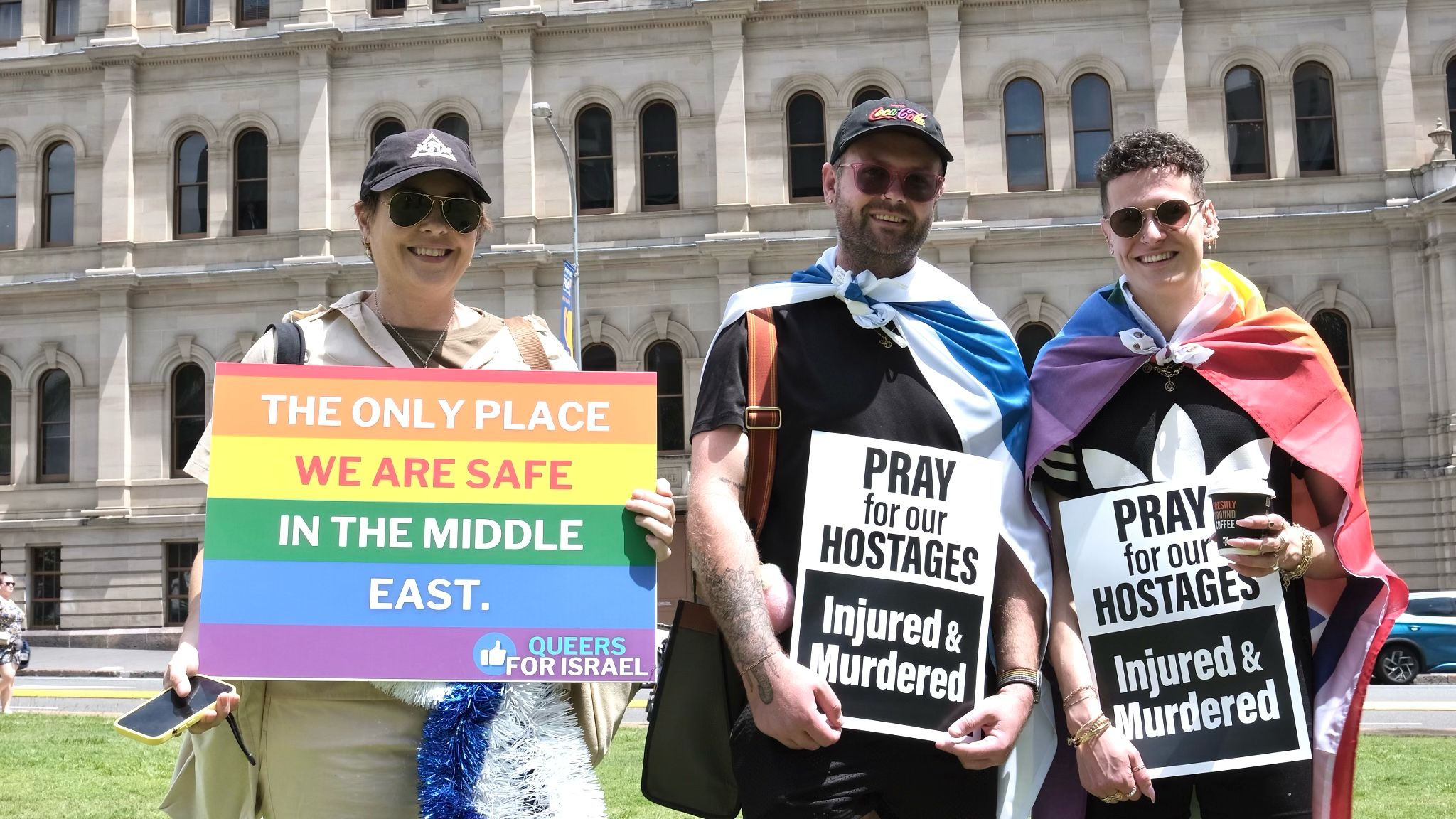
Pro-Israel activists in 2023 calling for the return of Israeli hostages and promoting LGBTQ-friendly Israel, reflecting secular expressions of Zionism.

Within labor Zionism, Berl Katznelson emerged as a central figure and leading interpreter of the ideas of Ber Borochov. After immigrating to the Land of Israel in 1909, he became a prominent intellectual and public leader, including as founder and editor of the newspaper Davar. Katznelson advocated the integration of Jewish cultural traditions—particularly the Hebrew language and historical memory—into a modern, secular socialist framework, emphasizing the reinterpretation of tradition rather than its rejection. His approach reflected a broader tendency within labor Zionism to adapt Jewish heritage to contemporary social and national life while maintaining a commitment to socialist ideals, and it influenced institutions such as the kibbutz movement and the wider labor movement in pre-state Jewish society.

The Histadrut was established in 1920 in pre-state Palestine to organise Jewish workers and promote a secular socialist Zionist movement. Owing to its strong organisational capacity and influence, it had attracted a large majority of the workforce by the time the State of Israel was founded in 1948, with approximately 75 per cent of workers affiliated. The secularist General Zionist party supported a unified system of education (as it contributed to the passage of the 1953 State Education Law) and a written constitution to enshrine democratic freedom and civil rights. The Progressive Party, formed in 1948, was a liberal party, most of whose founders came from the ranks of the progressive New Aliyah Party and HaOved HaTzioni, which had been active prior to independence.

In an effort to present a unified political position and address concerns that a Jewish state would be predominantly secular, David Ben-Gurion, Israel's first prime minister and a central figure in the establishment of the state, sent a letter to leaders of the ultra-Orthodox Jewish community proposing what later became known as the Status Quo Agreement. In this proposal, he sought their support in exchange for incorporating key elements of Jewish religious practice into state policy, including observance of Shabbat, adherence to Kashrut, and religious authority over matters of marriage and education. Following internal deliberations, religious representatives agreed to the arrangement, which helped shape the relationship between secular and ultra-Orthodox communities in the emerging state. The agreement was reached during the visit of the United Nations Special Committee on Palestine, which was present in the region for a limited period.

The signing of the Oslo Accords in the 1990s marked a turning point in tensions between secular and religious Zionist perspectives, with many religious Zionists strongly opposing the agreements. They often interpreted the peace process as an expression of secular Zionism's departure from core nationalist principles, leading to increased criticism of secular approaches as lacking a substantive ideological or spiritual foundation. Despite this criticism, the state itself remained central within religious Zionist thought. Rather than rejecting the secular state, religious Zionist thinkers sought to resolve the tension by attributing religious significance to the state and to Zionist nationalism, elevating them as key components of their ideological and theological framework. The base of the party Yisrael Beiteinu originally consisted of secular, Russian-speaking immigrants, although support from that demographic is in decline.

== Irreligion and secularism in Israel ==
=== Atheism and secularism ===
Atheism has historically played a limited role in Judaism, as Jewish religious and philosophical traditions have generally focused on interpreting the nature of God rather than questioning God's existence. In the modern period, particularly following the Holocaust, increased skepticism toward belief in a benevolent deity contributed to the development of more secular and humanistic forms of Jewish identity, rather than to the emergence of a cohesive atheist movement. In Israel, atheism remains relatively marginal due to the multifaceted nature of Jewish identity, which encompasses religion, culture, ethnicity, and national belonging. Individuals may reject belief in God while continuing to identify strongly as Jewish and participate in aspects of Jewish cultural and social life. The relationship between religion and secularity is therefore not strictly dichotomous, with Jewish traditions continuing to shape public institutions, national identity, and collective life. Jewish atheists in Israel generally do not constitute a unified social group, and expressions of atheism are often individual rather than communal. Nonbelief frequently exists alongside other dominant identities, such as nationalism or political ideology, and is sometimes expressed in informal or online settings. This reflects a broader pattern in which disbelief coexists with enduring cultural and national attachment to Judaism.

Although atheism and secularization are related, they are distinct concepts. Atheism refers to the absence of belief in God, whereas secularism more often describes a mode of life or identity that is not defined by religious observance. In the Israeli context, for example, a significant proportion of Jewish individuals identify as secular while still expressing belief in God, illustrating that secular identity does not necessarily imply atheism. Research has also noted the phenomenon of the "secular believer," in which individuals combine non-religious lifestyles with elements of religious belief. In recent decades, sociologists of religion have increasingly examined irreligion and atheism as distinct fields of study. The rise of movements such as New Atheism contributed to the development of an interdisciplinary focus on non-religion and secularity, highlighting that nonbelief has historically been underexplored and that atheism constitutes a significant and complex form of identity in its own right. Moreover, secular Jews may not actively practice religious observance, but Israel can serve as a primary means through which they express their Jewish identity.

=== Secular Jewish identity ===
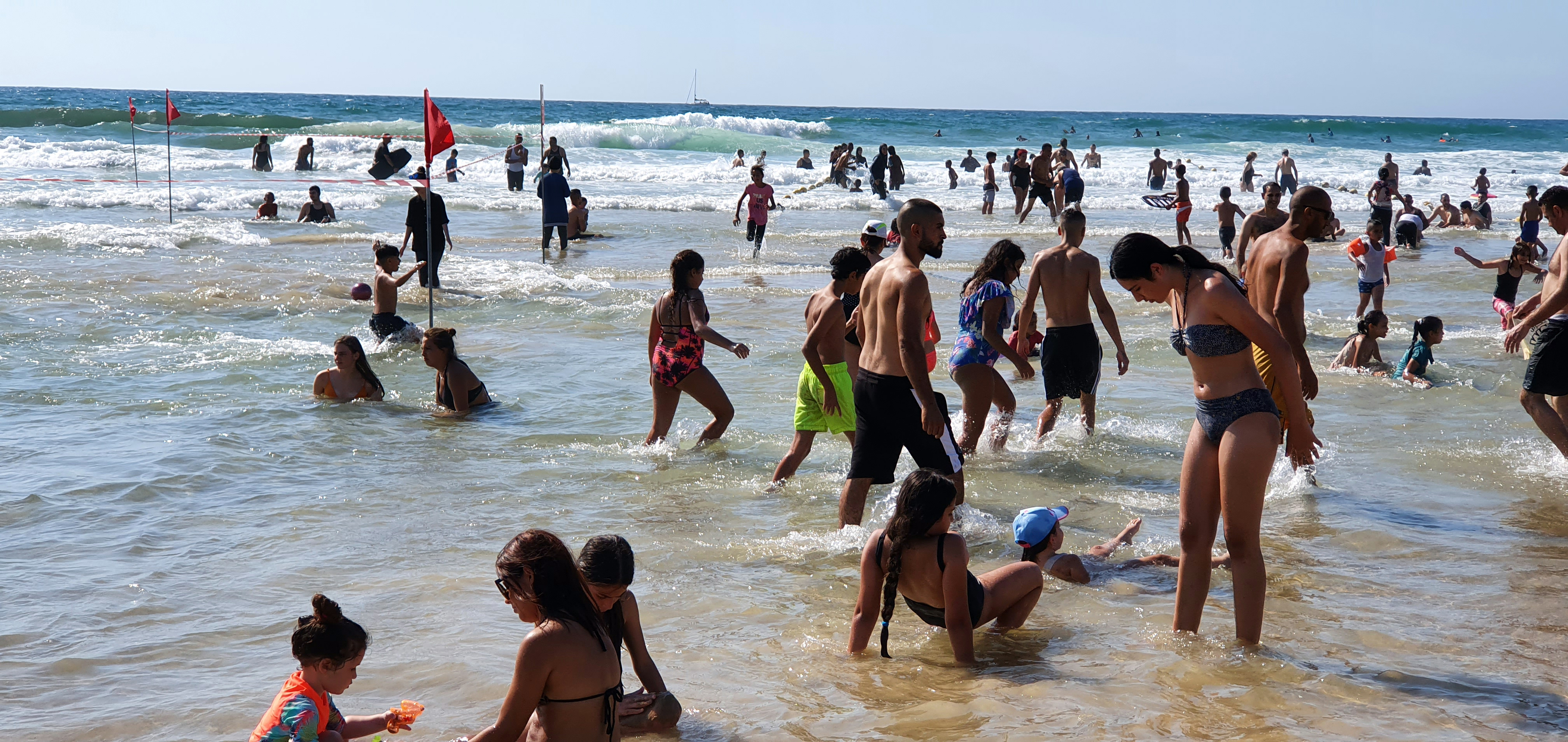
Beachgoers in Tel Aviv, reflecting the comparatively secular lifestyle and relaxed social norms in parts of Israeli society.

A form of Jewish identity has been described in which individuals who do not adhere to religious belief nonetheless maintain a strong attachment to Israel as a central component of their identity. In this context, Israel is framed as a cultural, historical, and national focal point through which secular or atheist Jews may express a sense of belonging, continuity, and collective memory in the absence of religious observance. This perspective emphasises that Jewish identity can be sustained through shared history, cultural traditions, and national affiliation rather than theological commitment, with Israel serving as a unifying symbol of peoplehood. It also reflects the view that identification with Israel can function as an alternative or complementary mode of expressing Jewish identity among those who are otherwise non-religious.

In Israel, common social categories of Jewish identity—such as ultra-Orthodox, religious Zionist, traditional, and secular—are generally defined in relation to religious observance, and there is no distinct category for atheism. Individuals who identify as secular may include those who reject belief in God, but atheists do not form a cohesive social group and are typically represented within broader secular classifications. Nonbelief often remains a secondary aspect of identity, with individuals more strongly identifying with other ideological or social frameworks such as nationalism or political movements. In this context, atheism is usually expressed on an individual basis rather than as a collective or organized identity. In Israel, the secularism of population centers varies. Tel Aviv, for example, is considered very secular and is considered one of the top party cities in the world. Non-Jews and secular Jews alike feel comfortable in this city because of the lack of religious bearing.

Zionism encompasses both religious and secular adherents, whose differing perspectives and priorities have contributed to the development of Israeli society. In secular Zionism, the establishment and development of Israel are attributed to practical achievements such as land development, institution-building, and economic and military capacity, reflecting a broader emphasis on self-reliance and national responsibility. While tensions between religious and secular Zionists have at times emerged, they share common commitments to the establishment and continuation of the State of Israel, which have often served as a unifying factor. Secular and religious Zionism differ in their underlying ideological foundations, particularly regarding the role of human agency and religion. Secular Zionism generally emphasizes that the security and development of a Jewish homeland depend on the actions and initiative of the Jewish people themselves. In this view, the establishment and success of the State of Israel are attributed primarily to human efforts, including land development, infrastructure-building, and institutional organization.

=== Religious–secular relations ===
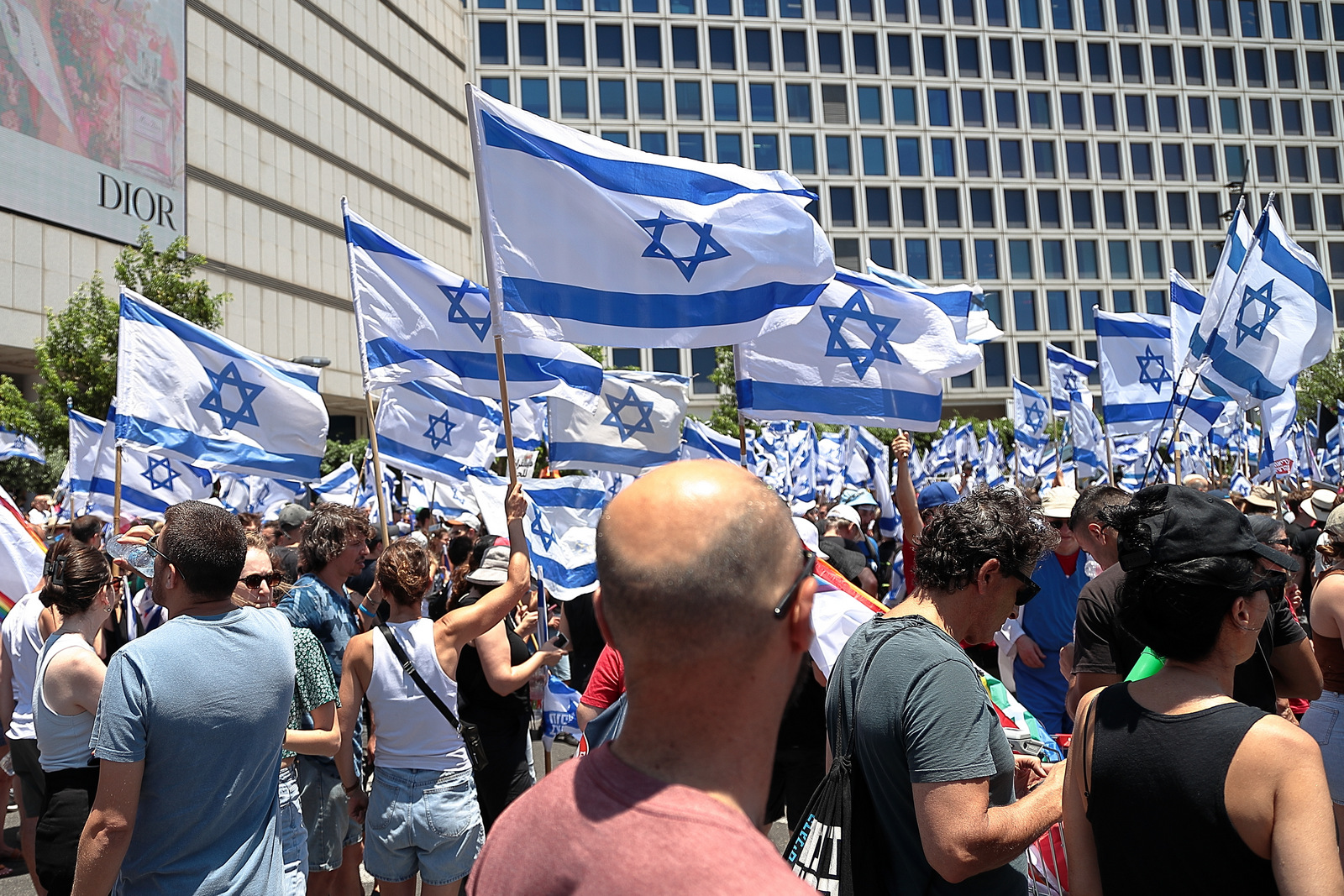
Demonstrators in Israel protest proposed judicial reforms in 2023, an issue linked to wider debates over governance and the role of religion in public life

Although Israel is often portrayed as socially uniform due to its identity as a Jewish state, divisions among Jewish communities of differing levels of religious observance have contributed to political and social tensions since its establishment. During the latter half of the twentieth century, these intra-religious differences remained relatively stable and were often not central to public debate. In recent decades, however, demographic changes—particularly the growth of the ultra-Orthodox population alongside increasingly secular and progressive segments of society—have intensified these divisions. This shift has influenced Israeli politics and public policy, affecting various political leaders, including Prime Minister Benjamin Netanyahu, and has prompted renewed discussion regarding the relationship between secular and religious communities in the country. Historian Tom Segev has described Israeli society as becoming both more secular and more religious simultaneously. Despite these tensions, shared security concerns, including conflicts involving Palestinian groups and Hezbollah, have at times contributed to a sense of common ground between these groups.

Some secular Israelis argue that revising existing laws could preserve the principles of the Status Quo Agreement while better accommodating a diverse population. Proponents contend that limited changes—such as permitting public transportation on Shabbat—would not significantly affect religious observance, noting that many secular and non-Jewish citizens already travel on that day. They argue that such measures could balance the interests of ultra-Orthodox communities with broader considerations of equality and accessibility for all citizens. Approximately seventy-five years after their adoption, the principles of the Status Quo Agreement have become increasingly contested. The Hours of Work and Rest Law of 1951 enforces observance of Shabbat by restricting most non-essential businesses and public transportation from operating between Friday and Saturday evening. Critics argue that these restrictions disproportionately affect secular and non-Jewish populations, particularly those reliant on public transport. While the Supreme Court of Israel has addressed aspects of the issue, comprehensive legislative reform has largely been avoided. Berl Katznelson's ideas influence discussions among secular Jews in Israel seeking to engage with Jewish culture outside the framework of religious belief and traditional observance. More broadly, the various secular Zionist ideologies each contributed distinct perspectives that shaped Zionist thought, sometimes in tension with one another but also in areas of overlap. This diversity of viewpoints has been seen as an important factor in the intellectual and cultural development of Israeli society.

Scholarly analyses have argued that the relationship between secular and religious forms of Zionism is more interconnected than a simple dichotomy suggests. In secular Zionism, the establishment of the State of Israel is generally understood as the result of human political agency, nationalism, and practical efforts such as settlement, institution-building, and economic development. By contrast, Religious Zionism—particularly in its messianic interpretations—interprets the same historical developments as part of a divine redemptive process, in which the modern state represents a stage in the fulfilment of religious prophecy. Rather than viewing these perspectives as wholly separate or opposed, some scholars have described Israeli political and ideological life as “post-secular,” in which religious and secular elements are closely intertwined. In this framework, religious Zionism is seen as both emerging from and reinterpreting earlier secular nationalist ideas, incorporating modern political concepts while imbuing them with theological meaning. This approach challenges conventional distinctions between religion and politics in Israel, suggesting that secular state-building and religious interpretation have developed in parallel and continue to shape one another in contemporary discourse and policy debates.

Among Jewish voters in Israel—who make up roughly 85% of the electorate—level of religiosity is a key predictor of voting behaviour and political attitudes. Higher levels of religious observance are strongly associated with right-wing positions and support for parties such as Likud and its allied bloc, while secular voters are more likely to support centrist and left-wing parties. This pattern was evident in the April 2019 Israeli legislative election, in which the right-wing and religious bloc secured 65 of the 120 seats in the Knesset, compared to 55 for the centre-left bloc, giving it a structural electoral advantage.

== Contemporary secular perspectives on Israel ==
=== Politics ===
North America

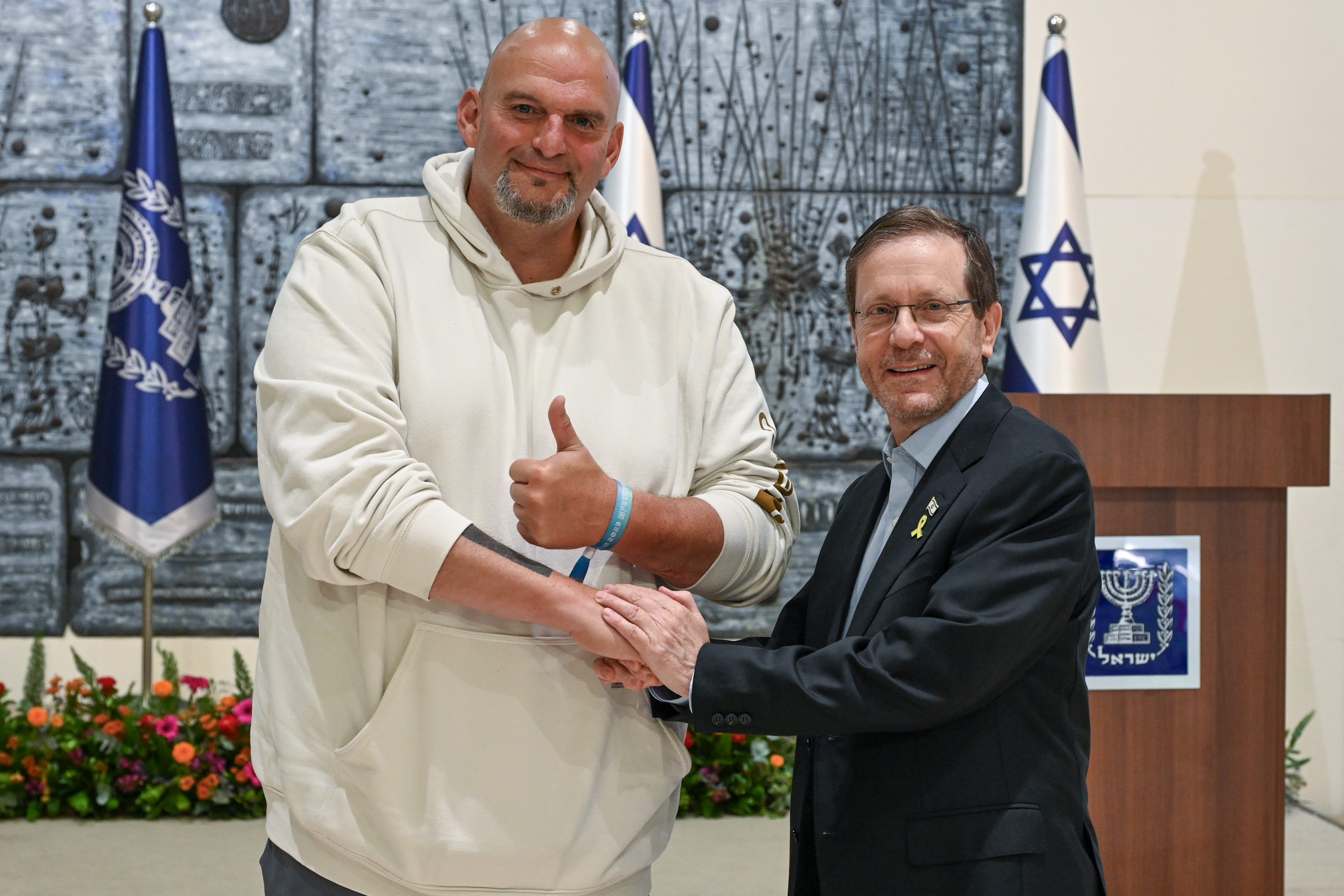
Democrat John Fetterman meets with Israeli president Isaac Herzog.

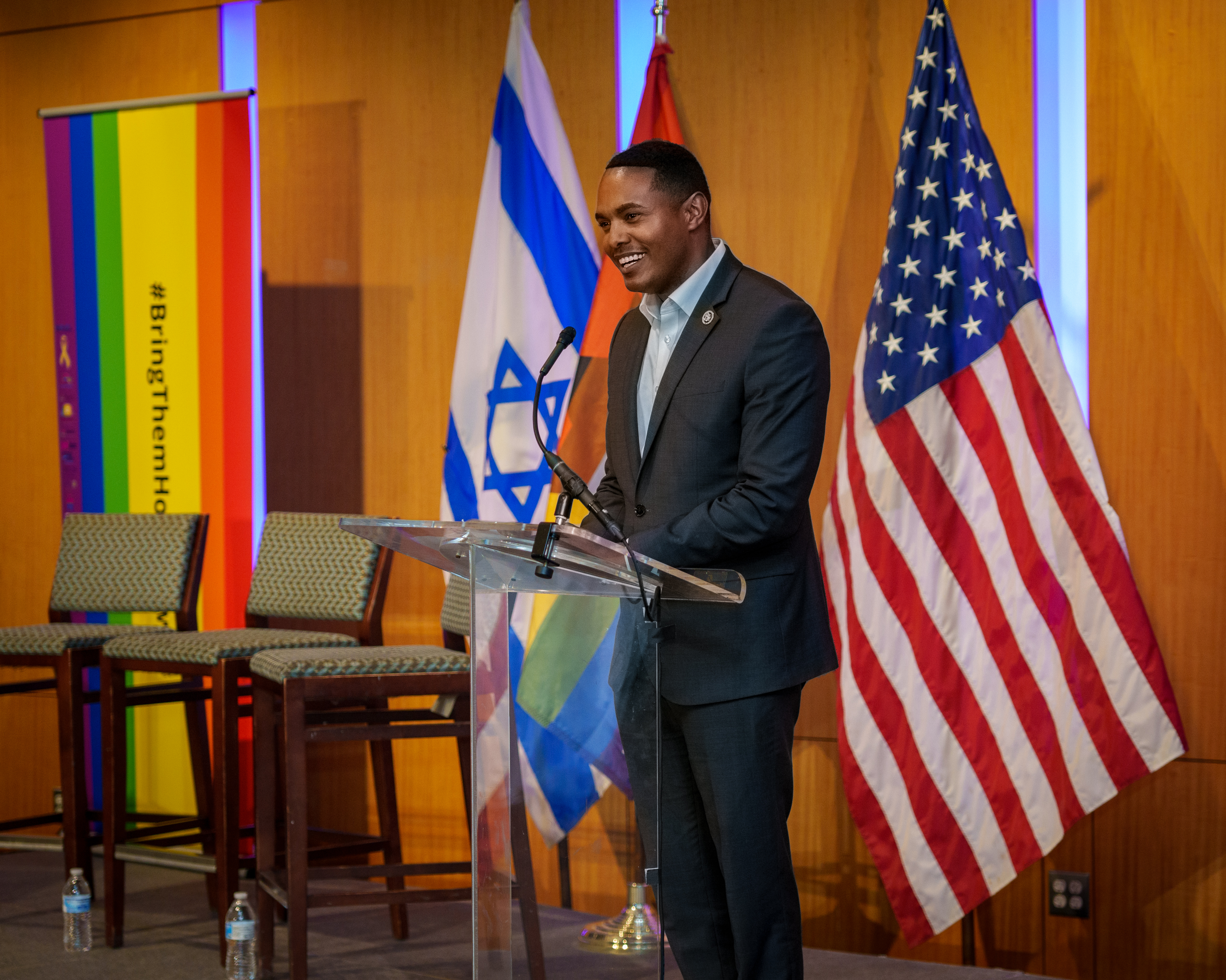
Democrat Ritchie Torres speaking at the Israeli embassy to the United States in 2024

Justin Trudeau, a secular political leader who served as Prime Minister of Canada, has affirmed support for Israel including acknowledging its right to defend itself following the 2023 Hamas attacks on Israel, and has described himself as a "Zionist" in 2025. U.S. Senator John Fetterman has staunchly backed Israel, including advocating for close cooperation with Israeli military actions. Fetterman has been described as politically liberal and secular, while his religious affiliation has not been publicly disclosed. U.S. Representative Ritchie Torres has described his strong support for Israel as secular, stating that although he identifies as culturally Christian, his Zionism is not rooted in religion. His staunch defense of Israel has drawn criticism from some progressive figures over his positions on the Israeli–Palestinian conflict.

American government official and television personality Dr. Mehmet Oz, who describes himself as a secular Sufi Muslim, has declared pro-Israel views. Kirsten Gillibrand, a U.S. Senator who was raised in a Catholic family but is not publicly known for strong religious affiliation, has given her full backing to Israel, including affirming its right to defend itself and supporting U.S. military assistance. Hakeem Jeffries, a U.S. Representative who has described his faith as not central to his public life despite a Christian upbringing, has voiced support for Israel, including endorsing its right to defend itself. Kyrsten Sinema, an independent U.S. Senator who has described herself as non-religious, has expressed her advocacy for Israel, including approving its right to defend itself. Progressive political commentator Ben Gleib, who was a Democratic candidate for President of the United States in 2020 and is a contributor on The Young Turks, has expressed support for Israel in commentary, a position that has been noted as differing from that of some other commentators on the program.

Europe and Australia

Boris Johnson, a former Prime Minister of the United Kingdom and a non-practising Christian, has expressed strong support for Israel, referring to himself as a “life-long friend, admirer and supporter” of the country and previously as a “passionate Zionist”. Conservative Party leader Kemi Badenoch has described herself as an agnostic and a cultural Christian, and is known for her strong support of Israel and close ties with pro-Israel groups within British politics. Dutch politician Geert Wilders, who has described himself as agnostic and irreligious, has strongly advocated for Israel, a position sometimes noted as distinctive in the context of his broader far-right political stance. Joschka Fischer, a leading figure in Germany’s Alliance 90/The Greens, was raised Catholic but is not religious, and has voiced support for Israel’s security and right to exist, emphasising Germany’s commitment to Israel based on its historical responsibility (a position that has been noted as differing from elements within parts of the European left and some Green Party members).

Making the Progressive Case for Israel is an edited volume published by Labour Friends of Israel in the United Kingdom that presents a range of arguments in solidarity with Israel from a progressive political perspective. The collection brings together contributions from politicians, academics, and commentators, addressing themes such as democracy, human rights, social justice, and labour movement traditions. It situates Israel within a centre-left framework by highlighting its parliamentary system, trade union history, and welfare institutions, while also engaging with criticisms related to the Israeli–Palestinian conflict. Contributors discuss issues including security, diplomacy, and the prospects for a negotiated two-state solution, aiming to reconcile support for Israel with broader progressive values. The volume is intended to contribute to political debate, particularly within centre-left circles, by presenting perspectives that emphasise both Israel’s democratic character and the challenges it faces.

Julia Gillard, who served as Prime Minister of Australia, has described herself as agnostic and has expressed her endorsement of Israel. Pauline Hanson, an Australian politician who has described herself as an atheist, has resolutely backed Israel, including statements in support of Australia’s Jewish community; her position contrasts with aspects of her broader association with the far-right in Australian politics, elements of which have been associated with antisemitism.

=== Media and public figures ===
United States

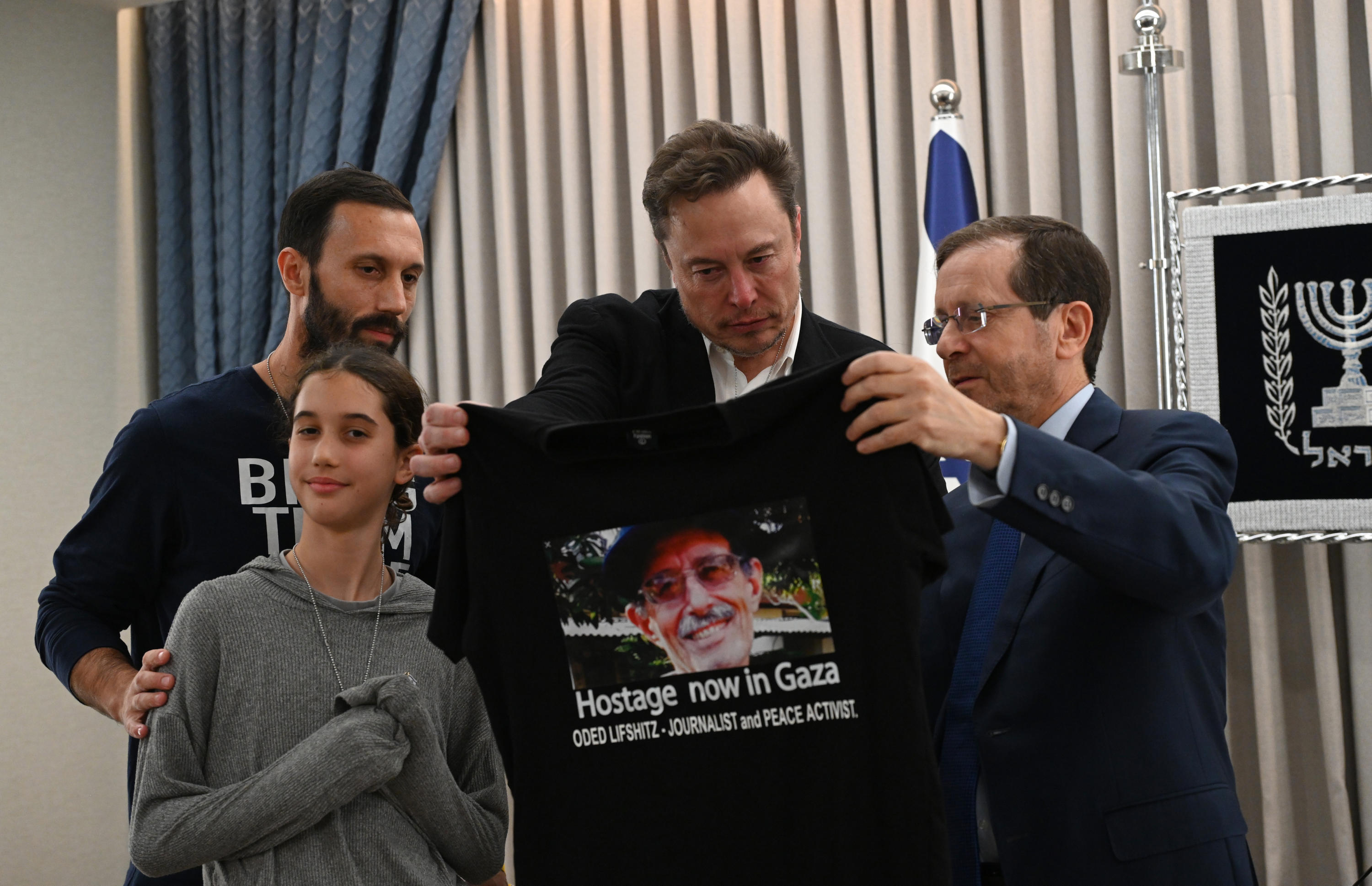
Elon Musk meets Isaac Herzog in Israel alongside families of hostages, who present symbols of captivity and call for their release.

Atheist philosopher Sam Harris has voiced support for Israel, often framing the conflict as a struggle between liberal democratic values and Islamist extremism. His interpretation of the Israel–Hamas war was described by critics as portraying the conflict in moral and civilizational terms, emphasizing jihadist ideology as the primary cause of violence while downplaying political and historical factors. American television host and comedian Bill Maher, who has described himself as agnostic or atheist, has strongly defended Israel, arguing that it represents liberal democratic values in contrast to groups such as Hamas. In a 2024 monologue, he criticized pro-Palestinian activism and asserted that LGBTQ individuals would face persecution in Gaza, stating that critics of Israel misunderstand the nature of oppression in the region. Following the 2023 Hamas attack on Israel, liberal atheist streamer Destiny has been supporting Israel, stating, "The Palestinians are oppressed by all the Arab countries, and no country from them, which is supposed to be on 'their' side, has bothered to offer them a real solution—and yet, their anger is directed fully at Israel, and unjustifiably in my opinion."

During a visit to Israel in November 2023, Elon Musk, who has described himself as “not particularly religious” and as “probably a cultural Christian”, expressed support for Israel’s position against Hamas, stating that Israel had “no choice” but to eliminate the group. American actor and comedian Jerry Seinfeld, who is a non-religious Jew, has repeatedly stood up for during the Gaza war, saying, “I will always stand with Israel and the Jewish people.” Political commentator Dave Rubin, who is a secular Jew, has voiced support for Israel and has rejected the establishment of a Palestinian state. American fitness personality and media figure Jillian Michaels, who has described herself as agnostic, showed support for Israel after walking off set during a heated discussion in 2025 in which guest Ana Kasparian ardently condemned the country, an incident interpreted as reflecting her opposition to rhetoric she viewed as hostile toward Israel. Larry Ellison, co-founder of Oracle Corporation, has been described as secular in outlook while maintaining a strong affiliation with his Jewish heritage, and is noted for his significant philanthropic support for Israel.

Europe and Australia

British commentator Douglas Murray, who has described himself as agnostic or atheist, has emerged as a prominent contemporary advocate of Zionism, particularly following the October 7 attacks. His outspoken endorsement for Israel—framed as a defense of Western civilization and liberal values—has significantly raised his public profile. His arguments emphasize moral clarity, opposition to antisemitism, and a broader civilizational struggle between democratic societies and their adversaries. British political commentator Konstantin Kisin has described himself as an agnostic and, in commentary on the Gaza war, has backed Israel's position. Pat Condell, a British atheist commentator and writer, has repeatedly expressed strong support for Israel, characterising it as a democratic state facing security threats, and has been notably critical of Palestinian political movements and violence, as reflected in his published commentary. British atheist author Brendan O'Neill has steadfastly supported Israel and has argued that anti-Zionism can function as a form of antisemitism. The English novelist George Eliot, an agnostic, expressed proto-Zionist ideas in her 1876 novel Daniel Deronda, which advocated the restoration of a Jewish homeland in Palestine and has been regarded as a precursor to modern Zionism.

Yemeni–Swedish journalist Luai Ahmed, who is an openly gay reformist, secular Muslim, has staunchly supported Israel and is in favour of a two-state solution. Somali-born Dutch writer Ayaan Hirsi Ali, who has described herself as largely secular despite later converting to Christianity, has warned of a rise in global antisemitism, characterizing it as an ideological movement that seeks to delegitimize both Israel and Jewish identity. She argues that this trend includes the normalization of hostile rhetoric, social exclusion, and the framing of Jews and Israel as oppressors within certain political movements. Australian political commentator Rita Panahi, who identifies as an atheist, backed Israel and Zionism following the 7 October attacks on Israel. She subsequently travelled to Israel, where she reported on the aftermath of the attacks and met with victims and their families, describing the destruction and personal testimonies of those affected, while publicly defending Israel and criticizing its opponents in media commentary. Australian conservative commentator Andrew Bolt has described himself as an irreligious rationalist and has criticized what he characterizes as the demonization of Israel by left-wing groups.

== Interpretations of secular and religious Zionism ==
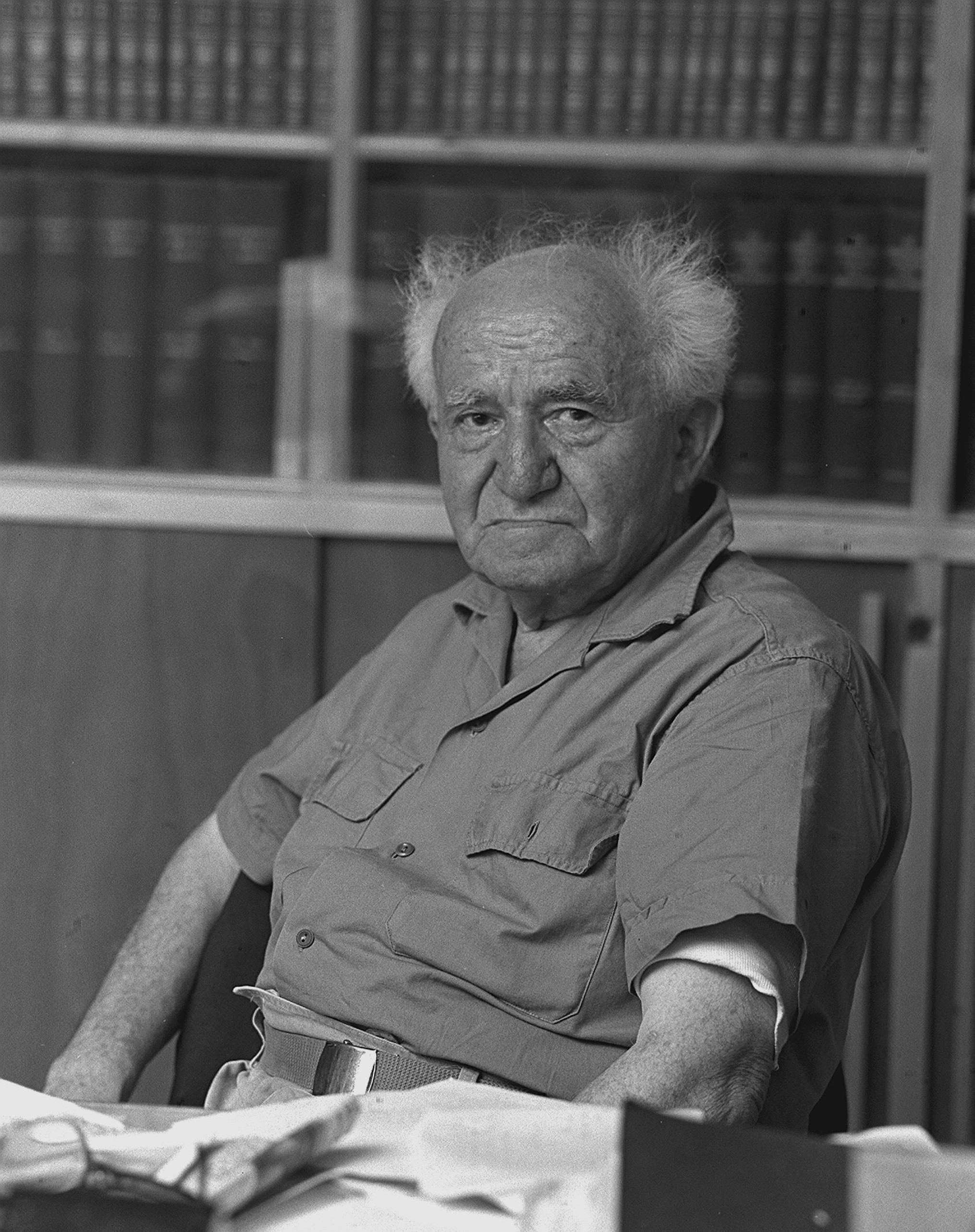
David Ben-Gurion considered himself irreligious, embracing atheism in his youth. Though unsympathetic to traditional Judaism, he frequently quoted the Bible in his speeches and writings.

Some perspectives emphasize that Zionism contains both secular and religious elements, rather than being exclusively one or the other. This interpretation also emphasizes that both religious and secular Zionist figures have, at times, invoked religious language or traditions to support political or national goals. As a result, secular Zionism is portrayed not as entirely detached from Judaism, but as incorporating elements of religious heritage into a nationalist framework. More broadly, this perspective suggests that the relationship between religion and nationalism in Zionism is complex and intertwined, rather than strictly divided. In this view, even forms of Zionism that present themselves as secular are seen as drawing on underlying religious concepts, such as the idea of the Jewish people as a distinct collective and the association with the Land of Israel. These interpretations highlight that religious and national identities are closely intertwined, and that Jewish identity often encompasses cultural, ethnic, and religious dimensions simultaneously. The state continued to occupy a central place in Religious Zionist thought, and disillusionment with secular Zionism did not lead to a rejection of the secular state. Rather, Religious Zionist thinkers sought to reconcile this tension by reinterpreting the state and Zionist nationalism as possessing religious significance, elevating them to a central value within their ideological framework.

For example, Max Nordau, a close associate of Theodor Herzl and a leading figure in early Zionist congresses, has been described as holding secular or non-religious views while nevertheless regarding religion as a constructive cultural force. Similarly, Ze'ev Jabotinsky, founder of Revisionist Zionism and an influence on later figures such as Menachem Begin, employed religious imagery in articulating nationalist ideas, at times characterizing his efforts as contributing to the symbolic "rebuilding" of a collective Jewish national identity. Nachman Syrkin, a leading figure in the development of labor Zionism, described the Jewish people in collective and symbolic terms, at times employing religious imagery to emphasize their historical and cultural significance. Similarly, Moshe Leib Lilienblum, who transitioned from a religious background to a more secular outlook, stressed the unity of the Jewish people, minimizing distinctions between believers and non-believers and presenting Jewish identity as encompassing both groups within a shared national framework.

=== Religious influences and critiques ===
David Ben-Gurion approached questions of legitimacy in largely national rather than theological terms. Interpretations of his views suggest that he regarded collective belief and historical consciousness among the Jewish people as a key source of legitimacy, rather than reliance on divine mandate. In this perspective, the enduring significance of traditional narratives lay in their role in shaping national identity and cohesion, regardless of their theological status. This perspective also notes that early Zionist thought was influenced not only by secular political leaders but also by religious figures who promoted ideas of return and settlement prior to the formation of modern political Zionism.

Figures such as Abraham Isaac Kook are described as interpreting the Zionist movement as inherently spiritual, even when led by secular actors, arguing that national revival and religious meaning were interconnected. Additionally, it highlights the overlap between religious and secular expressions within Zionism, suggesting that even self-identified secular leaders and thinkers often drew on religious language, symbolism, or cultural frameworks. In this context, secularism is presented not as a rejection of religious tradition, but as a reinterpretation of it within a nationalist framework. Some leaders within Orthodox Judaism outside of the United States expressed opposition to political Zionism because the Zionist movement espoused nationalism in a secular fashion and used "Zion", "Jerusalem", "Land of Israel", "redemption", and "ingathering of exiles" as literal rather than sacred terms, endeavoring to achieve them in this world.

More traditionalist groups like Agudat Yisrael opposed cooperation with secular Zionists. Some scholars have identified a growing divide in Israel between Halakhah and everyday social life, describing an increasing polarization between religious and secular segments of society. According to Israeli jurist Yedidia Stern, this reflects a widening gap between religious and secular Zionist communities. Elements of the American "New Atheist" movement, particularly figures such as Sam Harris, have been described as adopting a consistently pro-Israel stance that is interpreted as politically rather than philosophically driven. This perspective is associated with downplaying or overlooking key historical events such as the displacement of Palestinians during the establishment of Israel, while framing Israeli actions primarily as rational self-defence. It has also been suggested that New Atheist critiques of Islam are disproportionately emphasised, contributing to portrayals of Muslims as uniquely problematic, alongside comparatively limited criticism of Israeli policies.

== See also ==
- Cultural Zionism
- Religious Zionism
- Secularism in Israel
- Irreligion in Israel
- Hiloni
- Jewish atheism
- Jewish secularism
