= Felix Posen =

Felix D. Posen (October 24, 1928 – September 3, 2025) was a Jewish-American businessman, philanthropist, and cultural entrepreneur. He was best known for promoting the idea of "Judaism as culture", emphasizing Jewish history, literature, and philosophy as a cultural legacy beyond religion. In 1980 he founded the Posen Foundation, which became a leading organization supporting secular Jewish education and academic research worldwide. He also initiated The Posen Library of Jewish Culture and Civilization, a multi-volume anthology published by Yale University Press documenting Jewish culture and civilization across the ages.
