= Posen Foundation =

Israeli nonprofit foundation

The Posen Foundation is a nonprofit foundation that works internationally to support Jewish learning and advance Felix Posen's belief that a Jewish education is the birthright of every Jewish child and adult. By focusing on the cultural aspects of Jewish history, philosophy, and creativity, the Posen Foundation seeks to offer secular Jews an entrée into Jewish life and learning.

The Posen Foundation works in three main areas: teaching and teacher training; publishing books, textbooks, classroom syllabi, and online resources; and scholarly research. Most its projects are carried out through its office in Tel Aviv, Israel.

== History ==
The Posen Foundation was started in the early 1980s by American philanthropist Felix Posen, whose initial focus was the study of antisemitism. Posen was the main financial supporter of the newly founded Vidal Sassoon Center for the Study of Antisemitism. Soon thereafter, Posen, who was raised Orthodox, became fascinated with the question of what it means to be literate in Jewish history, culture, and ideas as a secular Jew. His reading into Jewish history and ideas—subjects outside the boundary of his religious education—led to concern over the lack of "Jewish literacy" among secular Jews. "These are, after all, the majority of the Jews worldwide," he had said.

In the 1980s, Posen encountered the concept of Judaism as Culture, which would guide much of his philanthropy during the 1990s and 2000s. Judaism as Culture is an approach to Jewish history, life, and learning that emphasizes Jewish culture, philosophy, and creativity, and includes religion as one aspect of Jewish civilization. It approaches the study of those subjects from a critical, secular point of view.

Although Posen had yet to articulate his approach, as he later would, the principles behind Judaism as Culture would be integral to the Posen Foundation's future work—though that work would be diverse. During the 1980s, and into the 1990s, the Posen Foundation supported the Oxford Centre for Hebrew and Jewish Studies (then the Oxford Centre for Postgraduate Hebrew Studies). In the early 1990s, the Posen Foundation helped create the School for Educational Leadership in Jerusalem, an elite, pluralistic school for Israelis, which it supported (along with the Israeli Ministry of Education and the Mandel Foundation) until 1999.

In the early 2000s, the Posen Foundation launched the Posen Project for the Study of Secular Jewish History and Culture, which provided course development grants to more than three-dozen universities in Israel, North America, and Europe. These courses examined the modern, secularizing trends of the post-Enlightenment period of Jewish history, and were taught with various disciplinary approaches, including history, literature, and sociology.

In recent years, the Posen Foundation has focused much of its efforts on Israel, and Felix Posen's son, Daniel, has assumed a larger role in the foundation's operations. Daniel Posen now serves as the CEO and public face of the Posen Foundation; he travels frequently to the U.S. and Israel, giving speeches and meeting with Jewish foundations. He has engineered a shift in the Posen Foundation's priorities, from academia towards community-based programs.

At present, the Posen Foundation's major projects include a large, multi-year publishing project, The Posen Library of Jewish Culture and Civilization, on which more than 120 scholars are participating. The complete series will comprise ten volumes, each roughly 1,000 pages long. The Posen Foundation has also begun a competitive Fellowship, the Posen Society of Fellows, designed to support emerging scholars of modern Jewish history and culture.

== Work ==
=== Israel-based initiatives ===
Today, the majority of the Posen Foundation's work is conducted in Israel and administered by its main office in Tel Aviv. Some of these projects are educational resources, while others were designed to encourage young Israeli school teachers to develop and expand their knowledge of the humanities, Jewish history, and contemporary methods of teaching.

=== Ofakim ===
Established in 2004, the Ofakim program, at Tel Aviv University, trains elite college students for careers in Israeli secondary (public) schools. Students prepare to teach Jewish culture and philosophy from a critical, secular perspective, using the approach known as Judaism as Culture. In return for full scholarships and generous monthly stipends, Ofakim students commit to teaching at least three years in a high school in Israel. Ofakim graduates receive a bachelor's degree as well as a Teacher's Certification in Jewish Philosophy.

=== Tarbut.il ===
The Tarbut.il website is an educational resource that focuses on Israel's culture and heritage, and serves as an online training tool for educators. Designed as a "cultural meeting point" and created in collaboration with the Avi Chai Foundation and the Hartman Institute, it was created first and foremost for teachers, but also to educate and stimulate conversation, and even controversy, among students, teachers, and the general public. tarbut.il does not subscribe to any creed or dogma; rather, it serves as an instrument for "those whose hearts and minds are open to getting to know the different shades of Jewish-Israeli culture". It serves as the official website of Ministry of Education for Jewish Studies from First degree through high school.

=== Posen Society of Fellows ===
Each year, the Posen Foundation inducts six new fellows whose research deals with modern Jewish history and culture. Fellows receive a two-year grant worth $40,000 towards the completion of their doctoral dissertation. Fellows are selected from around the world, and they convene each summer to discuss their research and writing, and learn from an elite group of Jewish Studies scholars. The Posen Society of Fellows is aimed at supporting future scholars of Jewish Studies.

=== Posen Library of Jewish Culture and Civilization ===
The Posen Library of Jewish Culture and Civilization is a ten-volume anthology, published by Yale University Press, that collects 3,000 years of Jewish literature, artwork, and artifacts. Its purpose, according to Felix Posen, is to demonstrate the breadth and richness of Jewish culture—secular and religious—from around the world. Posen initiated the project in the 1990s, and the mammoth effort has continued gradually ever since. To date, nine volumes have been published:

- Volume 10: Late Twentieth Century, 1973–2005 (2012), edited by Deborah Dash Moore and Nurith Gertz
- Volume 6: Confronting Modernity, 1750–1880 (2019), edited by Elisheva Carlebach Jofen
- Volume 8: Crisis and Creativity between World Wars, 1918–1939 (2020), edited by Todd Endelman
- Volume 9: Catastrophe and Rebirth, 1939–1973 (2020), edited by Samuel Kassow
- Volume 1: Ancient Israel from Its Beginnings to 332 BCE, (2021) edited by Jeffrey H. Tigay and Adele Berlin
- Volume 5: Early Modern Era, 1500–1750 (2023), edited by Yosef Kaplan
- Volume 7: National Renaissance and International Horizons, 1880–1918 (2023), Israel Bartal and Kenneth B. Moss
- Volume 2: Emerging Judaism, 332 BCE–600 CE (2025), edited by Carol Bakhos
- Volume 3: Encountering Christianity and Islam, 600–1200 (2026), edited by Arnold Franklin

The remaining volumes are in various stages of completion. Meanwhile, an effort to digitize the majority of the Posen Library's contents is ongoing. The Posen Digital Library debuted online in December 2014, and will expand alongside the print Library. A new version of the website launched in late 2023. It can be found at posenlibrary.com.

=== Publications ===
The Posen Foundation has supported myriad academic and non-academic publications since its founding. In 2010, historian David Biale published the first-ever history of Jewish secular thought, Not in the Heavens, with the Posen Foundation's support. In 2007, an encyclopedia, New Jewish Time: Jewish Culture in a Secular Age—An Encyclopedic View was published in Hebrew. The five-volume work contained more than 250 entries by respected scholars of Jewish history from around the world.

The Posen Foundation underwrote a collection of articles, written from a contemporary and historical perspective, which were published as a supplement in the Israeli newspaper Haaretz. The articles dealt with the kulturkampf between Orthodoxy and secularism in Israel; secularity as a worldview and a way of life; and the intersection of secularism and feminism, jurisprudence, and ethics.

Other publications include a two-volume textbook for undergraduates published by Open University, in Israel. Designed for undergraduates who are teaching the subject of Judaism as Culture, the textbook is the first of its kind and may one day be translated into English.

In 2012, Jews and Words, a companion volume to Volume 10 of The Posen Library of Jewish Culture and Civilization, was authored by Amos Oz and his daughter, the historian Fania Oz-Salzberger, to much acclaim. Jews and Words is an exploration of the centrality of texts in Jewish culture and in their own family. Jewish history, the authors argue, is a unique continuum, one that is neither primarily ethnic nor political; its central artery is not a bloodline, but a textline.

All of the publications produced by or supported by the Posen Foundation are intended to advance Felix Posen's original vision of an engaged, educated, proud Jewish community, including the religious and the non-religious.
