= Jewish atheism =

Atheism practiced by ethnic and cultural Jews

Jewish atheism is the ideology of Jews who do not believe in God but have not rejected their Jewish identity or attachment to the Jewish people.

"Jewish atheism" is not a contradiction because Jewish identity encompasses not only religious components but also ethnic and cultural ones. Jewish law's emphasis on descent through the mother means that even religiously conservative Orthodox Jewish authorities would accept an atheist born to a Jewish mother as fully Jewish.

Jewish secularism, which describes Jews who do not explicitly reject the existence of God but also do not believe it is an important part of their Jewishness, has a long tradition in the United States.

== Statistics ==
A 2013 Pew Research Center study found that 62% of self-described American Jews say being Jewish is mainly a matter of ancestry and culture, while 15% say it is mainly a matter of religion. Even among Jews by religion, 55% say being Jewish is mainly a matter of ancestry and culture, while 66% say it is not necessary to believe in supernatural concepts (such as God or the afterlife) to be Jewish. A 2025 Pew Research Center study found that 26% of self-described American Jews "don't believe in God or a universal spirit and they are certain in this belief".

== Organized Jewish life ==
Irreligious and secular Jewish organizations mostly date to the 20th century, from the Jewish socialist Bund in early-20th-century Poland to the modern Congress of Secular Jewish Organizations and the Society for Humanistic Judaism in the United States.

Jewish atheists and agnostics may feel comfortable within any of the three major non-Orthodox Jewish denominations (Reform, Conservative, and Reconstructionist). This is less of a contradiction than it might seem, given Judaism's emphasis on practice over belief, with even mainstream guides to Judaism suggesting that belief in God is not necessary for Jewish observance. But Orthodox Judaism regards the acceptance of the "Yoke of Heaven" (the sovereignty of the God of Israel upon the Jewish people and the divine revelation of the Torah) as a fundamental obligation for all Jews, and the Reform Jewish movement has rejected atheistic temples' efforts at affiliation, even though many Reform, Conservative, and Reconstructionist Jews are either atheists or agnostics themselves. Nevertheless, there are many atheist and agnostic Jews in modern non-Orthodox Jewish denominations.

== Jewish theology ==
In the 19th century and early 20th century, Reform Judaism in the United States, which became the dominant form of Judaism in the country by the 1880s, was profoundly shaped by its engagement with high-profile skeptics and atheist thinkers such as Robert Ingersoll and Felix Adler, and rabbis such as Isaac Mayer Wise, Kaufmann Kohler, Emil G. Hirsch, Joseph Krauskopf, Aaron Hahn, and J. Leonard Levy, resulting in a distinctly panentheistic US Reform Jewish theology, which many would view as atheistic, skeptic, or having irreligious tendencies.

Liberal Jewish theology makes few metaphysical claims and is thus compatible with atheism on an ontological level. The founder of Reconstructionist Judaism, Mordecai Kaplan, espoused a naturalistic definition of God, and some proponents of post-Holocaust theology have also eschewed belief in a personal god. The Jewish philosopher Howard Wettstein has advanced a non-metaphysical approach to religious commitment, according to which metaphysical theism-atheism is not the issue. Harold Schulweis, a Conservative rabbi trained in the Reconstructionist tradition, has argued that Jewish theology should move from a focus on God to an emphasis on "godliness". This "predicate theology", while continuing to use theistic language, makes few metaphysical claims that non-believers would find objectionable.

== Secular Jewish culture ==
Many Jewish atheists reject even this level of ritualized and symbolic identification, instead embracing a thoroughgoing secularity and basing their Jewishness entirely in ethnicity and secular Jewish culture. Possibilities for secular Jewishness include identification with Jewish history and peoplehood, immersion in Jewish literature (including such non-religious Jewish authors as Philip Roth and Amos Oz), consumption of Jewish food, use of Jewish humor, and attachment to Jewish languages such as Yiddish, Hebrew, and Ladino. A high proportion of Israeli Jews consider themselves secular, rejecting some religious practices (see also: Religion in Israel).

Jewish atheists and agnostics may continue to observe Jewish traditions, holidays, and customs, but view them more as cultural heritage than religious obligations. For example, celebrating Hanukkah or Passover can be seen as an important family and cultural ritual rather than a religious act. In the documentary series Еврейское счастье (Jewish Happiness), alongside exploring other aspects, the question "Who is a Jew?" is extensively discussed. In one episode, a family of atheists deeply engages in certain Jewish religious traditions, such as Shabbat, which, one of the documentary's characters asserts, has come to us as a tradition from ancient times but fits very well into contemporary reality. Specifically, it provides the opportunity to spend a whole day communicating with one's children, free from pervasive modern issues like phubbing and FOMO.

Some Jewish atheists are active in secular and humanist movements that advocate separation of church and state, human rights, and a scientific worldview.

== Notable people ==
Famous atheist or agnostic Jews include Albert Einstein, Karl Marx, and Sigmund Freud. Their views on religion influenced their work and philosophical positions as well as subsequent scientists and philosophers. Many well-known Jews have rejected a belief in deities. Some have denied the existence of a traditional deity while continuing to use religious language. Marx was born into an ethnically Jewish family but raised as a Lutheran, and is among the most notable and influential atheist thinkers of modern history; he developed dialectical and historical materialism, which became the basis for his critique of capitalism and theories of scientific socialism. He was a major influence on other prominent Jewish intellectuals, including Moses Hess. One of Marx's most cited comments on religion is "Religion is the sigh of the oppressed creature, the heart of a heartless world, and the soul of soulless conditions. It is the opium of the people."

The contradictory symbiosis between religiosity and atheism among atheists in the Jewish context has ambivalent qualities and is discussed extensively in The Cambridge Companion to Atheism, as is how Jewish thinkers deal with these dynamics. This nuanced connection is also evident in other prominent Jewish atheists who maintained their cultural identity. The text discusses how the concept of religion developed in a Judeo-Christian context can be incorrect when applied outside that context. But careful application of these concepts can shed light on the unique perspectives of Jewish atheists who still value their cultural heritage. In Freud's The Future of an Illusion, he eschews religious belief and outlines its origins and prospects. But Freud also urged a Jewish colleague to raise his son in the Jewish religion, saying, "If you do not let your son grow up as a Jew, you will deprive him of those sources of energy which cannot be replaced by anything else." Other researchers have written about Freud's views on religion and Jewish identity.

Ayn Rand, a Russian-born American philosopher of Jewish descent, was a staunch atheist and considered atheism an integral part of her philosophy of objectivism. Her ideas significantly influenced libertarianism and individualism.

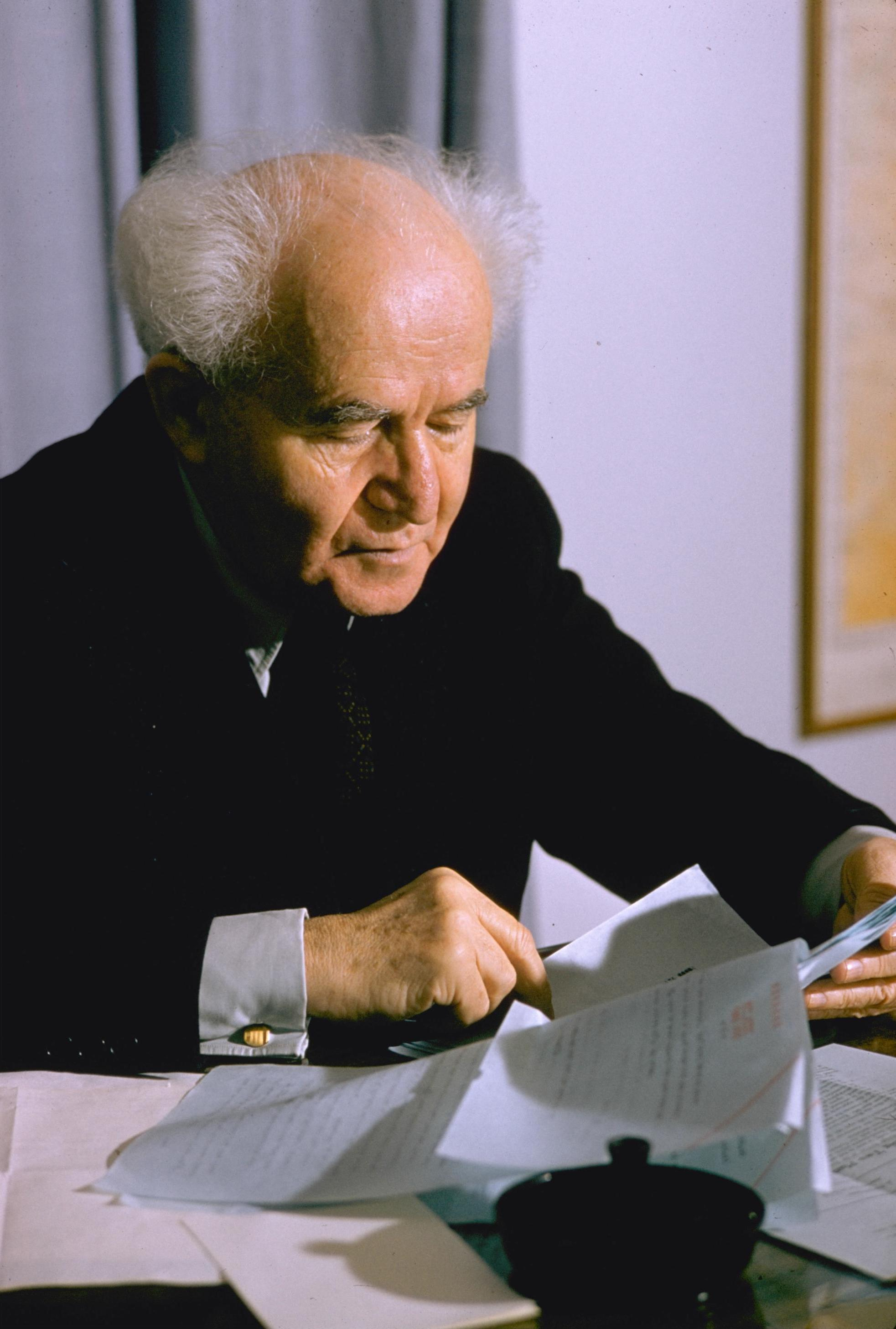
Israeli Prime Minister David Ben-Gurion did not believe in God

Other famous Jews have wholeheartedly embraced atheism, rejecting religiosity altogether. The anarchist Emma Goldman was born to an Orthodox Jewish family and rejected belief in God, while the Israeli prime minister Golda Meir, when asked if she believed in God, answered: "I believe in the Jewish people, and the Jewish people believe in God." Of David Ben-Gurion, the founder of Israel known for his atheism, it was often said: "Although he didn't believe in God, it seems God believed in him." Woody Allen's work often explores the tension between his Jewishness and religious doubt ("Not only is there no God, but try getting a plumber on weekends"). David Silverman, president of the American Atheists from 2010 to 2018, swore after his bar mitzvah that he would never again lie about his atheism. American Jewish author Philip Roth was an outspoken atheist and called himself anti-religious.

== Research studies ==
Jewish atheism has a long history, with recorded sources dating to the 17th century. Dutch philosopher Baruch Spinoza is considered the Jewish herald of the secular age. In his Historical and Critical Dictionary, Pierre Bayle called Spinoza "the greatest atheist". Jewish thinkers of the 19th century were especially zealous in accusing Spinoza of atheism (criticizing his work Ethics), especially in terms of his denial of "revelation", but this was not atheism in the modern sense.

In the 19th and 20th centuries, many Jews embraced secular and socialist ideals. Particularly in the Soviet Union and other Eastern European countries, many Jews became atheists under the influence of communist ideology.

Confirming the diverse history of Jewish atheism, reflecting a wide range of views and approaches to faith and identity, a blog entry by Vladimir Minkov on the Times of Israel portal notes that a significant portion of modern U.S. Jews identify themselves as atheists or agnostics. Minkov argues that this is due to various factors, including lack of deep understanding of Jewish religious teachings and desire to find a Jewish identity outside traditional religious frameworks. Some interviews with Jewish atheists show that many of them continue to observe Jewish traditions and participate in cultural activities despite renouncing their religious beliefs. This demonstrates ambivalence when cultural-ethnic identity and a certain religiosity are preserved even in the absence of faith in God. Thus atheism among Jews is not only widespread but multifaceted, providing rich material for research and discussion on the topic of faith and identity in the Jewish context and making atheism among Jews an interesting subject for interdisciplinary research.

== See also ==
- Apostasy in Judaism
- Criticism of Judaism
- Epikoros
- Haskalah
- Heresy in Judaism
- Hiloni
- Humanistic Judaism
- Jewish schisms
- Jewish secularism
- Jewish skeptics
- List of Jewish atheists and agnostics
- Off the derech
- Secularism in Israel
