= Hiloni =

Least religious Jews in Israel

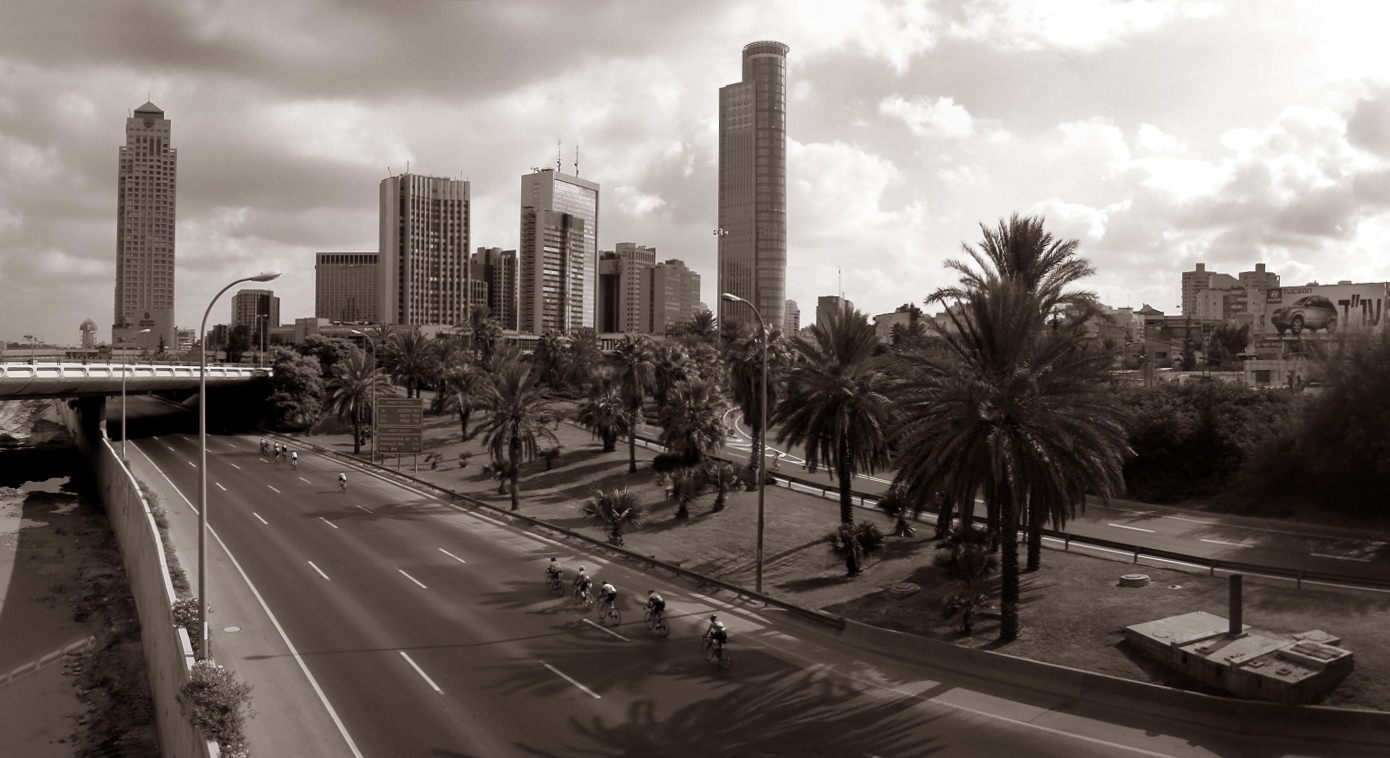
Cyclists ride down the deserted Ayalon Highway in Tel Aviv on Yom Kippur, the holiest day in Judaism, in 2004.

Hiloni (Hebrew: חִלּוֹנִי; plural hilonim; Hebrew: חִלּוֹנִים, lit. 'secular') is a social category in Israel, designating the least religious segment among the Jewish public. The other three subgroups on the scale of Jewish-Israeli religiosity are the masortim, 'traditional'; datiim, 'religious'; and haredim, 'ultra-orthodox'. In the 2018 Israel Central Bureau of Statistics' survey, 43.2% of Jews identified as hiloni.

== Definitions ==
In the Israeli parlance, hiloni is used to identify Jews who observe fewer traditional practices than the other, more religious, Jewish subgroups (apart from that, the term may also be used as a derogatory epithet by observant Jews, or to be associated with secularism). Between 2002 and 2018, among Jewish adult respondents to ICBS polls, self-identified hilonim numbered between a maximum of 45% in 2005 and a minimum of 41.4% in 2009. In 2018, the figure was 43.2%.

Though hiloni literally means "secular", many scholars argue it is problematic in translation. Professor Yoav Peled preferred to render it as "nonobservant." Kenneth D. Wald and Samuel Shye commented that:

It is essential to recall that secularity in Israel is defined in reaction to the extremely stringent demands of Orthodox Judaism and does not necessarily entail a conscious rejection of Jewish religious identity or even necessarily connote indifference. Although their standard of observance is low by Orthodox standards, many of the ostensibly secular exhibit an array of religious acts that would mark them off as fairly religious in the American context. Though the term is misleading, "secular" is the common label to identify people who do not consistently practice the ritual behavior mandated by Orthodox Judaism.

The demarcation between the hiloni category and the nearest, the masorti or "traditional", is highly porous. Surveys demonstrated that it is not reliant on objective levels of belief or ritual observance, but mainly on socioethnic lines: Ashkenazi Israelis, either native or post-Soviet immigrants, tend to describe themselves as "secular" even when they observe or believe quite substantially, and Mizrahi and Sephardi Israelis usually regard themselves as "traditional" regardless of lifestyle and conviction. Among Mizrahim and Sephardim, those who aspire to emulate Ashkenazim also tend to adopt the label hiloni. Nevertheless, some MENA-descended Jews, such as those who emigrated from Iraq and Algeria, have labelled themselves as hiloni for other reasons, likely since they were influenced by Haskalah and by Secular Zionism. Many surveys offer to the masortim the sub-category of "not very religious/tending to hiloni". Between 2002 and 2018, those who identified as such in ICBS polls, ranged from a minimum of 21.4% to a maximum of 28.4% of the entire sample, or roughly two-thirds of all masortim.

Israeli social scientists measure levels of religiosity/secularity among Jews in terms of practice, not faith, and use the category of "totally nonobservant" to identify the completely secular. In the 2009 Guttman Center survey, the most comprehensive on the matter, 46% of all respondents reported they were hiloni. About 16% of the entire sample, virtually all of them hiloni, stated they were "totally nonobservant". Almost all the rest of the hiloni were "somewhat observant", and a negligible minority stated "observance to great extent". As many ritual behaviours, like setting a Mezuzah, are part of Jewish-Israeli lifestyle and lack an overt religious connotation, the "totally nonobservant" often perform some. In the 1999 Guttman survey, only a third of them did not practice any of the ten common rituals studied. At the other end, Yaacov Yadgar and Charles Liebman estimated in 2009 that about 25% of the hilonim are highly observant, on par with the more religious subgroups.

In matters of faith, four surveys between 2009 and 2019 imply that on average, 60% of the hiloni respondents believe in God, 20% are convinced atheists, and 20% do not believe but "sometimes think God exists". Pertaining to other supernatural notions, the Guttman surveys and other polls show that a considerable share hold various such: between 25% and 36%, believe that God revealed the Law and precepts at Sinai, that a higher power guides Jewish history, that the Jews are a chosen people and that there is a soul that survives death. Only disbelief in the Messiah and the World to Come closely correlates with self-identification as hiloni. Denominational identification, as known among American and other Western Jews, is mostly irrelevant in the Israeli context (hilonim have no equivalent category in the American Jewish community). Yet, when asked in the 2015 Pew Research Center survey of Israeli society, 23% of the hiloni respondents identified as Orthodox, 5% as Reform and 2% as Conservative. 64% did not identify with any particular movement.

While hilonim are often hostile to the state rabbinate, fear the growth of the haredi populace, and oppose further religious legislation in Israel, secularism in the common sense of the word is rather rare in the country. Orthodoxy plays a central role in defining national identity, and religious issues like conversion are regarded as crucial by the vast majority. When "separation of religion and state" is used in the Israeli context, it is mostly understood as a wish to abolish the many laws curtailing personal freedom, not actual separation. This innate tension led to a state of affairs dubbed by Professor Stephen Sharot as "secularization without secularism": since the 1990s, the demand of both masorti and hiloni Israelis for consumer activity on the Sabbath (technically illegal), non-kosher food and the like, considerably liberalized the public sphere, but barely affected religious legislation and did not introduce principled secularism into the political arena.

== See also ==
- Irreligion in Israel
- Religion in Israel
- Jewish secularism
- Jewish atheism
- Secular Zionism
- Secularism in Israel
