= Irreligion in Israel =

Irreligion in Israel is difficult to measure. Though Israeli Jewish society is highly secularized when compared to the rest of the Middle East, the importance of religion in state life leaves little room for total disengagement from it. Some 20% of Israeli Jews do not believe in a deity, and some 15% claim to observe no religious practices. Israeli Arab society is much more religious, with any degree of secularity barely acknowledged.

== Definitions and statistics ==
Measurement of religiosity or the lack thereof are particularly complex in the Israeli context. Religion plays a central part in the national and societal level; Israelis are involuntarily registered as members of the state's fourteen recognized autonomous faith communities, which exercise control over marriage, burial and other matters of personal status. Society is clearly divided along ethno-religious lines. Even subjectively, when polled, hardly anyone identifies as having no religion.

Some 4.5% of the populace are "religiously unclassified", a legal status conferred upon anyone (including Karaites, Buddhists, and other faith groups) who is not a member of a recognized religion. Many of the "unclassified" are Russian Orthodox Christian immigrants from the former Soviet Union, who arrived under the Law of Return and did not register their faith. A small number of Jewish notables, spearheaded by author Yoram Kaniuk in May 2011, successfully petitioned courts for having their religious status (registered in the Ministry of the Interior) changed from "Jewish" to "unclassified", citing antipathy towards the rabbinic establishment and the wish to be free from its control. The religious authorities themselves, however, are unaffected by this ruling and retain a right of veto over the newly "unclassified".

Among Israel's Jewish populace, only 20% or so identify as "religious", a figure which, misleadingly, sometimes places the country at the top of global irreligion surveys. However, being "religious" implies strict observance of Orthodox ritual law. The other 80% identify as either Masortim, "traditional" (30–40%), or Hilonim, "secular" (40–50%). Almost all the "traditional" and many of the "secular" both affirm various religious beliefs and practice a considerable array of Jewish rituals. Indeed, scholars argued that "secular" is problematic in translation (likewise, though hostility toward the state rabbinate is ubiquitous, secularism in the common sense of advocating separation of church and state is rather rare in the country). Professor Yoav Peled preferred to render Hiloni – 60% of whom believe in God, according to polls, and 25% affirm that He literally revealed the Law at Sinai – as "nonobservant".

Emphasizing the superiority of practice to faith in Judaism, Israeli social scientists measure secularity and religiosity in terms of the rigour of observance, not beliefs. The Guttman Center, running the most thorough survey of Jewish-Israeli religious attitudes, employs the category of "totally nonobservant" to identify the completely secular. In 2009, 16% of respondents identified as such. Owing to the prevalence of practices like selective dietary purity or fixing a doorpost amulet, and their amalgamation into Israeli ordinary lifestyle without an overt religious connotation, many of the "totally nonobservant" actually perform not a few of these. In the 1999 Guttman survey, while 21% stated they are "totally nonobservant", only 7% did not practice any of the ten common ritual behaviours studied. Utter personal secularity of the Western sort is uncommon.

Concerning the existence of a deity, the results of four major polls, conducted between 2009 and 2019, imply that some 20% of Jewish Israelis do not believe in God: of these, one carried out in 2018 found that 11% "sometimes think God exists" and 9% were convinced atheists. Regarding other supernatural notions, 28% of respondents to the Guttman 2009 survey denied efficacy to prayer, 33% did not believe that the Jews are a chosen people, 35% did not affirm that the Law and the precepts are God-given, 44% rejected the notions of a World to Come and afterlife, and 49% did not believe in a future coming of a Messiah. These findings largely commensurate with the 1991 and 1999 surveys.

In the Israeli Arab populace, which is overwhelmingly Muslim, a small minority identify as "secular"; in the 2018 Israel Central Bureau of Statistics' general survey, 7% of Muslims identified as "not religious." Yet the meaning of being "secular" is even weaker than among Israeli Jews. While some Israeli Muslims largely ignore religious commandments in their personal lives (avoiding daily prayer and not fasting on Ramadan are the main hallmarks), open disregard is virtually unheard of. Many of them maintain religious beliefs, and utter disattachment from Islam is extremely rare. Muslim society does not acknowledge and has no concept of non-religiosity. Scholar Ronald Kronish commented that "traditional" would be a more appropriate epithet for the "secular", estimated to constitute 10–20% of the whole population.

== See also ==
- Demographics of Israel
- Freedom of religion in Israel
- Hiloni
- Religion in Israel
- Secularism in Israel
- Secular Zionism
