= Secularism in Israel =

Secularism in Israel shows how matters of religion and how matters of state are related within Israel. Secularism is defined as an indifference to, rejection, or exclusion of religion and religious consideration. In Israel, this applies to the entirely secular community that identifies with no religion and the secular community within the Jewish community. When Israel was established as a new state in 1948, a new and different Jewish identity formed for the newly created Israeli population. This population was defined by the Israeli culture and Hebrew language, their experience with the Holocaust, and the need to band together against conflict with hostile neighbors in the Middle East.

== History ==
Since 1922, many official documents originating in the land of Israel gave rise to religious freedom. In 1922, the Palestinian Mandate prohibited discrimination based on religious affiliation. In 1948, at the establishment of the state of Israel, the Declaration of Independence protected freedom of religion. The Declaration of the Establishment of the State of Israel was approved by members of the Jewish community of Palestine and the Zionist movement. The document's first section sheds light on the relationship between the Jewish people and the Land of Israel. It reads: "The Land of Israel was the birthplace of the Jewish people. Here, their spiritual, religious, and political identity was shaped." The history of the Jews establishing the State of Israel is long. The right of the Jewish people to settle in the land was recognized in the Balfour Declaration. The United Nations General Assembly passed the resolution that called for a Jewish state to be established in Eretz Israel on November 29, 1947.

== Separation of religion and state ==
When he first proposed his ideas of political Zionism, Theodor Herzl was expecting the future Jewish state to be a secular state, in the style of central European countries of the time, such as Germany and Austria. However, Zionist and eventually Israeli politics were firmly coalition-based. When David Ben-Gurion became the first prime minister of Israel, although he was the head of the large Socialist party, he formed a government that included the religious Jewish parties, and took a moderate line in forming the relationship between the state and the religious institutions, at the same time continuing their status as state organs. Some secular Israelis feel constrained by the strict religious sanctions imposed on them. Many businesses close on Shabbat, including El Al, Israel's leading airline, along with many forms of public transportation, and restaurants.

=== Policies controlled by religious leaders ===
Matrimonial law is based on the millet or confessional community system which had been employed in the Ottoman Empire, including what is now Israel, was not modified during the British Mandate of the region, and remains in force in the State of Israel.

Israel recognizes only marriages under the faiths of Jewish, Muslim, and Druze communities, and ten specified denominations of Christianity. Marriages in each community are under the jurisdiction of their own religious authorities. The religious authority for Jewish marriages performed in Israel is the Chief Rabbinate of Israel and the Rabbinical courts. The Israeli Interior Ministry registers marriages on presentation of the required documentation. Israel's religious authorities — the only entities authorized to perform weddings in Israel — do not marry couples where both partners do not have the same religion; the only way for people of different (or no) faith to marry is by converting to the same religion. However, civil, interfaith, and same-sex marriages entered into abroad are recognized by the state; as a consequence Israeli residents not permitted to marry in Israel sometimes marry overseas, often in nearby Cyprus, or are married on Israeli soil via videotelephony by an officiant from overseas if such solemnization is legal in the officiant's home country. Civil unions are also available within Israel for opposite-sex couples without any religion.

=== Religious influences in politics ===
Many religious symbols have found their way into Israeli national symbols. For example, the flag of the country is similar to a tallit, or prayer shawl, with its blue stripes. The national coat of arms displays the menorah. The Israeli national anthem includes references of religion. "As long as the Jewish spirit is yearning" and "the two-thousand-year-old hope" are both lines in the anthem, "HaTikvah" ("The Hope"). (HaTikvah was sung at Jewish prayer services for many years prior to the 1948 UN partition that allowed for the reestablishment of Israel as a nation state.)

Due to the role of religious influences in government and politics, Israel is sometimes not considered to be a fully secular state in the common sense of the word.

== Location ==
In Israel, the secularism of population centers varies. Tel Aviv, for example, is considered more secular; it is very cosmopolitan, with modern hotels, boutiques, coffee shops, and events with loud music. Tel Aviv is a modern coastal city, and considered by some, such as by guidebook publisher Lonely Planet, as one of the top party cities in the world. It is typical to find bars and night clubs open until dawn, even on Shabbat. Conversely, Jerusalem is a very religious, conservative city, with a large Orthodox Jewish (Religious Zionists, as well as Ultra-Orthodox) population, and has seen comparatively more religious violence and aggression.

== Discrimination issues ==
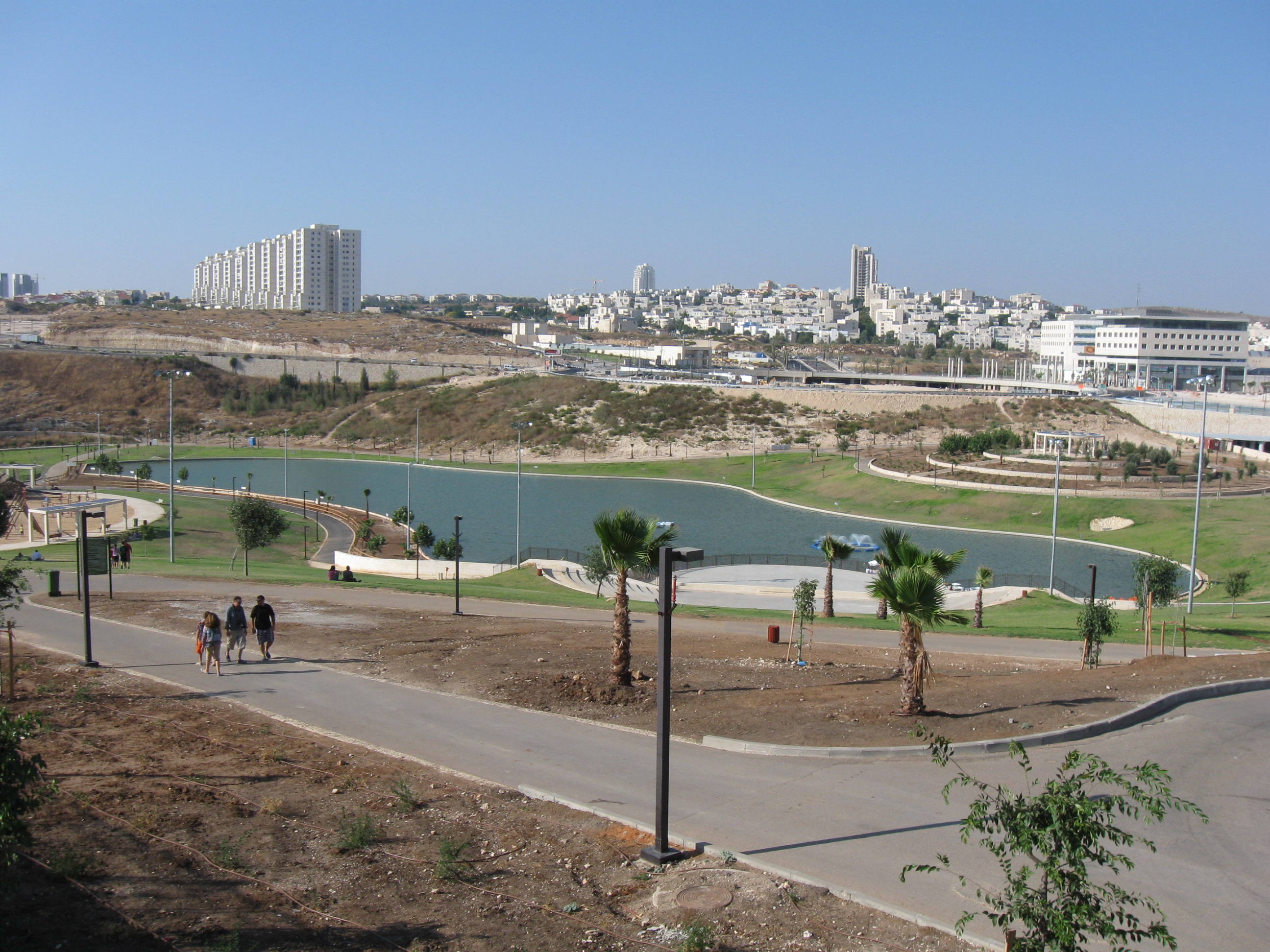
Anaba Park in Modi'in

=== Housing ===
As of November 2012, secular and Orthodox Jews are competing in a bidding war for apartments in Harish after a court ruled that the Israel Land Administration could not discriminate between them. Elsewhere, officials in Jerusalem City Hall have alleged that the Ministry of Housing worked with ILA to favor housing for Chareidim in the Ramot area of Jerusalem.

=== Public access ===
The Association for Civil Rights in Israel has called upon the mayor of Modi'in to revoke a residents-only restriction to Anaba Park during the High Holidays and summer vacation, deeming it a discrimination against Haredim in the neighboring settlement of Modi'in Illit. The Jewish Telegraphic Agency reports that this municipality of about 80,000 is predominately secular. The regulation was seen as a response to threats from Hareidim to bar secular visitors from a heritage site in Modi'in Illit.

== See also ==
- Hiloni
- Irreligion in Israel
- Jewish secularism
