= Jewish secularism =

Secularism in a specifically Jewish context

Jewish secularism (Hebrew: יהדות חילונית) refers to secularism in a Jewish context, denoting the definition of Jewish identity with little or no attention given to its religious aspects. (Note: Not to be confused with the epithet "secular Jew", which has various meanings in different contexts. A "secular Jew" may be a religious Jew who espouses secularism in a general context; in the 20th century, American rabbis who endorsed strict separation of church and state were the most prominent example of "secular Jews". Broadly, it may denote any Jew who partakes in secular life and is not extremely religious.) The concept of Jewish secularism first arose in the late 19th century, with its influence peaking during the interwar period.

== History ==
=== Jews and secularisation ===
Marranos in Spain, who retained some sense of Jewish identity and alienation while formally Catholic, anticipated the European secularisation process to some degree. Their diaspora outside Iberia united believing Catholics, returnees to Judaism (on both accounts, rarely fully at comfort in their religions) and deists in one "Marrano nation." Baruch Spinoza, the herald of the secular age, advocated the demise of religious control over society and the delegation of faith to the private sphere. Yet his notions lacked anything specifically Jewish: He believed that without the ceremonial law to define Jews, their collective existence would eventually cease, an outcome he regarded as welcome. There is no evidence he retained a sense of Jewishness after being anathemised in 1656. Religious laxity and acculturation, widespread among Spanish exiles, began to appear among the Ashkenazim of Central Europe when affluent court Jews entered Christian society.

At the end of the 18th century, communal autonomy was gradually abolished by the rising centralised states of Europe, and with it the authority of rabbis and wardens to criminally sanction transgressors. Acculturation, piecemeal integration and, far less importantly, Enlightenment thought, all rapidly chafed at traditional observance. With the weakening of the Catholic Church, Jews' traditional role as humiliated witnesses to its self-professed truth was no longer a political maxim, and the absolutist rulers pondered how to turn them into useful subjects. Jewish intellectuals, members of a new non-rabbinic secularised elite, likewise attempted to solve the modern problems. Radical Jewish enlighteners like Saul Ascher, Lazarus Bendavid and Perez Peter Beer (1758-1838) suggested that Judaism be reduced to little more than deism. Yet even their arguments were predicated on the concept of divine revelation, aiming to restore the religion to an ancient, "pure" version, before God's commandments were supposedly corrupted by irrational additions.

Eventually, the constraints of emancipation in Central and Western Europe, willing to tolerate Jews as a Christian-like denomination and rejecting any vestige of corporate autonomy, ensured that modernization and secularisation were expressed in confessionalising Judaism. It was limited to the private sphere, while its adherents were expected to conform to civil norms in the public one and identify with the nation-state in the political, often as "citizens of the Mosaic faith". The synagogue, family life, and strictly religious questions – the differentiation between "secular" and "religious" spheres, imported from Christianity, was alien to Jewish tradition – were the only venues where Jewishness could be expressed. The nascent Reform movement radically altered the religion so it could be adapted to modern circumstances. The traditionalists, coalescing into self-aware Orthodoxy, silently tolerated change while turning a blind eye to unprincipled laxity. In modernist Orthodox circles, acculturation was even lauded.

The scholars of the "Science of Judaism", who introduced critical academic methods in the study of Jewish history, rebutted traditional interpretation but were rarely interested in alternatives for the secularised, modern crowd. They even scorned the efforts of religious reform, whether radical or conservative, and many were convinced that Judaism was destined to dissipate; Moritz Steinschneider once commented that they aimed to "duly bury its corpse". Utter religious apathy was common among 19th-century Jews, but any positive identity did not accompany it. The children of such people often converted to Christianity.

=== The rise of Jewish secularism ===
Only in late-19th century Eastern Europe did a new, positive and secular definition of Jewish existence arise. Eastern European Jews, more than 90% of world Jewry at the time, were decidedly unacculturated: In 1897, 97% declared Yiddish their mother tongue and only 26% could read the Russian alphabet. Hebrew remained the language of letters, and traditional education was the norm; out of 5.2 million Jews, only 21,308 attended state schools in 1880. Suffering severe discrimination, they remained a distinct corporate and ethnic group. Secularisation processes were slow: Radical enlighteners, preaching civic integration and modernisation, had to contend with a well-entrenched rabbinic leadership which enjoyed little-questioned prestige. Unlike their emancipated brethren in the West, their Jewishness was self-evident and unreflective. On that "thick" layer of ethnicity, with virtually no alternative high culture to assimilate into, the slow disintegration of community life and exposure to modern notions allowed an adaptation, rather than marginalisation. In the 1870s and 1880s, several Jewish national movements coalesced in Eastern Europe, coupled with a literary renaissance of Hebrew and Yiddish. In tandem, young intellectuals advanced a radically new understanding of Jewish identity.

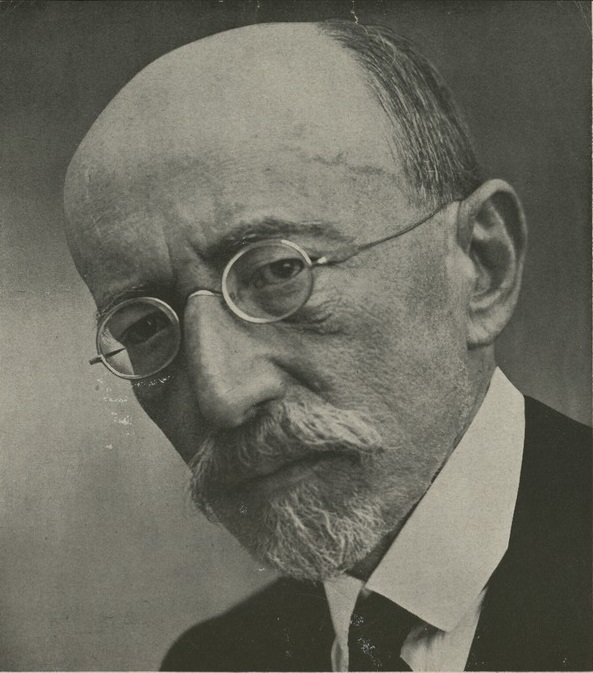
Ahad Ha'am, one of the most prominent Jewish secularist ideologues

The most prominent of these, who is widely considered as the father of Jewish secularism, was Asher Hirsch Ginsberg, known by his nom de plume Ahad Ha'am. Unlike other thinkers exposed to the influences of secularisation, he did not seek to avoid their implications, but to confront them while maintaining full continuity with the Jewish past. He understood that the theological discourse which defined Jews was about to lose relevance, first for the young and educated and later for most. While others ignored the subject, Ginsberg delineated a revolutionary solution, borrowing especially from the social Darwinism of Herbert Spencer. He utterly disposed of the question of revelation, which so concerned the Orthodox and Reform in the west, and that of divine election. In his secular, agnostic view, the people arose by itself, not by God's intervention; the driving, enlivening force of Jewish history was not the transmission of God's teachings through the generations, but the creative instincts and "national spirit" of the Jewish people. He described himself and his like-minded in 1898: The free-thinking Jew, who loves his own people, is a pantheist. He sees the creativity of the national spirit from within, where the believer only sees a higher power intervening from without.

Ahad Ha'am was not the only one, and far from the most radical, to promulgate a cultural-national conception of Jewishness. His harsh critic Micha Josef Berdyczewski, strongly influenced by Nietzsche, sought a transvaluation of values and preached for a rupture with the past. Ginsberg greatly valued tradition, regarding it not as a body of divine commandments standing in their own right, but as a set of customs aimed at consolidating the people, which could be adapted or abandoned based on that same consideration (this instrumental view of Jewish law was adopted by many secularist ideologists, and even taught as historically factual). Simon Dubnow, yet another leading intellectual of the cultural-national school, was particularly influential in developing a secular Jewish historiography. "Science of Judaism" scholars in Germany, mainly Heinrich Graetz, secularized the rabbinic view of the past, but maintained a religion-based view of it. In Dubnow's work, serving as the basis for all secularist historians, the Jewish people were a "psychological organism", with every individual but "a cell" therein, which was imbued with the primordial instinct to form collective institutions. Dubnow and his supporters espoused national personal autonomy for the Jews in Russia. Yet another thinker, whose philosophy was more explicitly concerned only with Eastern European Jews, was Chaim Zhitlowsky, the founder of radical Yiddishism. With the demise of faith, Zhitlowsky advocated that a monolinguistic Yiddish nation and culture were the future of local Jews, with old traditions serving as folklore to be selectively adopted. Neither he nor his followers ever discussed other Jewish ethnic groups.

Ahad Ha'am, Berdyczewski, Dubnow and Zhitlowsky were only few of the most prominent Jewish secularist ideologues of their age. Hundreds of others, influenced by the major thinkers and supporting the various national movements, were active among the millions in the Pale of Settlement, Poland and the adjacent regions.

=== Apogee ===
The new understanding of Jewishness swiftly spread from the intellectuals to the rest of society, into the spheres of popular culture and daily life. As Eastern European Jews were undergoing secularisation and acculturation, in the end of the 19th and early 20th centuries, and being recognised as a national minority with autonomous rights in the interwar period, Jewish secularism thrived. From the socialist Bund to the bourgeois Folkspartei, Jewish political parties declared their commitment to propagating the new views among the public. Even the Zionists, who were more keen to cooperate with the Orthodox, lost many traditional members when they adopted a similar policy in their 1911 Zionist Congress. A new literary canon, authored by writers committed to the secular cause, was to provide the people with a Jewish culture that could compete with the Polish or Russian ones. It was supplemented with burgeoning theatre and press scenes, reaching a vast audience. Intellectuals, dedicated to a secular cultural revival, enlisted to reinterpret and reformulate the holidays and other aspects of Jewish tradition: New children's songs, for example, served to sideline the old religious narratives and impart new ones, centered on the family or the nation. The secular messages were spread by the modern Jewish schools and youth movements, which catered to hundreds of thousands of pupils.

The logic of redefining the Jewish people as a modern nation was extended to the criteria for being a Jew, emphasizing ethno-cultural markings. Ahad Ha'am repudiated the idea of conversion, which he regarded as invalid. Berdyczewski advocated assimilating the Palestinian Arabs into Jewish society through intermarriage, without conversion. Not a few Yiddishists, like Bundist ideologue A. Litvak (Khayim Yankl Helfand), urged that declaring Yiddish as one's mother tongue was the only measure for determining Jewish nationality. Zionist Jakob Klatzkin declared that those who identified with other nations (as did most Western and Central European "citizens of Mosaic faith"), were committing "national apostasy", and were therefore outside the pale of Jewishness.

Among the millions of Eastern Europeans who immigrated to the United States and other western countries, the new Jewish secularism imported from home continued to prosper. A group of radical intellectuals coalesced in 1915 to found The Menorah Journal, advocating a "secular Hebrew" identity and deriding religion and the rabbis. Socialist Yiddishists, organised in the Arbeter Ring and other trade unions, furthered the secular reformulation of Jewish life: traditional texts, like the Passover Haggadah, were supplanted with Yiddish or English editions, emphasising Jewish class consciousness and anti-rabbinism. The dense immigrants' neighbourhoods in New York provided a strong sense of Jewish ethnicity, and an audience for the intellectuals and cultural activists.

In the Zionist movement in the Land of Israel, Cultural Zionism, strongly influenced by Ahad Ha'am, was the dominant philosophy. The highly centralised and ideologically-driven Zionist enterprise in the land, allowed its leaders to rapidly disseminate the intellectual products of their philosophers and thinkers, committed to create a new Jewish culture. The old holidays were refocused: Hanukkah's religious aspects, centering on the miracle of the oil, were de-emphasized in favor of historical aspects of national sovereignty and a victory against foreign enemies. Secular Zionism emphasized holidays associated with agriculture and historical independence, while holidays centered on religious observance, like Yom Kippur, became less prominent.

== See also ==
- Center for Cultural Judaism
- Hiloni, "secular", least religious social category in Israel
- Humanistic Judaism
- Jewish atheism
- Jewish skeptics
- Labour Zionism
  - Hashomer Hatzair
- List of Jewish atheists and agnostics
- Off the derech
- Peretz Centre for Secular Jewish Culture
- Secularism in Israel
