= List of irreligious organizations =

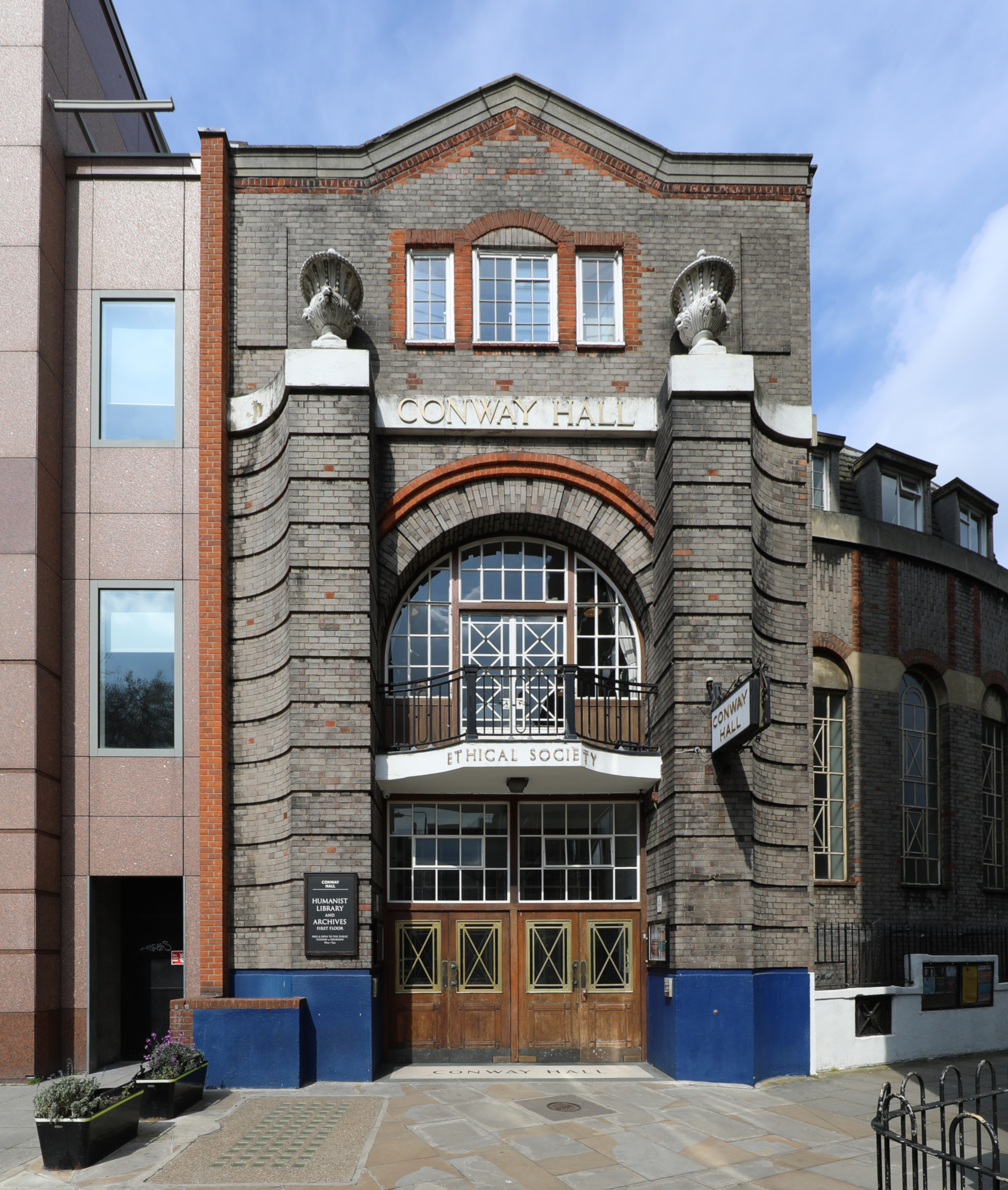
Conway Hall, home of the Conway Hall Ethical Society, is the oldest freethought community in the world (established in 1793).

Irreligious organizations promote the view that moral standards should be based solely on naturalistic considerations, without reference to supernatural concepts (such as God or an afterlife), any desire to do good for a reward after death, or any fear of punishment for not believing in life after death.

== Background ==
Individuals and organizations sharing these views, identify themselves by a variety of terms, including, bright, freethinker, naturalist, rationalist, or skeptic. Despite the use of these various terms, the organizations listed here have goals in common. Note that, while most of these organizations and their members consider themselves irreligious, there are certain exceptions (Ethical Culture, for example).

In some jurisdictions, a provincial or national humanist society may confer upon Humanist officiants the ability to conduct memorial services, child naming ceremonies or officiate marriages – tasks which would be carried out by clergy in most organized religions.

== List ==
- Atheist Republic is the world's largest atheist organization with local chapters called consulates all over the world. Their facebook page has over 2.4 million followers.
- The Brights' Net is a nonprofit educational organization dedicated to "building a constituency" and "constructively address[ing] the marginalized situation of persons who have a naturalistic worldview."
- The Clergy Project provides support, community, and hope to religious professionals who no longer hold supernatural beliefs.
- European Humanist Federation is a union of "numerous humanist organisations from most European countries" whose purpose is to promote humanism and secularism in Europe.
- Humanists International is "the sole world umbrella organisation embracing Humanist, atheist, rationalist, secularist, skeptic, laique, [sic] ethical cultural, freethought and similar organisations world-wide." Humanists International is a union of over 100 Humanist or secularist organizations in more than 40 countries. It is an international NGO (non-governmental organization) with special consultative status with the United Nations.
  - Young Humanists International, Humanists International's youth wing
- International League of Humanists
- Sunday Assembly

=== Australia ===
- Council of Australian Humanist Societies
- Fusion Party
- National Secular Lobby
- Rationalist Society of Australia
- The Secular Party of Australia

=== Belgium ===
- Willemsfonds

=== Brazil ===
- Brazilian Association of Atheists and Agnostics (ATEA)
- Secular Humanist League of Brazil

=== Canada ===
- Centre for Inquiry Canada
- Freethought Association of Canada
- Humanist Canada, formerly Humanist Association of Canada
- Mouvement laïque québécois
- Toronto Secular Alliance

=== Finland ===
- Union of Freethinkers of Finland, founded the Eroakirkosta.fi web service

=== France ===
- Fédération nationale de la libre pensée
- Union rationaliste

=== Germany ===
- Atheist Refugee Relief
- Central Council of Ex-Muslims
- German Freethinkers League
- Giordano Bruno Foundation (Giordano-Bruno-Stiftung, gbs)
- International League of Non-Religious and Atheists (IBKA)
- Humanistischer Verband Deutschlands (HVD)
- Party of Humanists (Partei der Humanisten)

=== Greece ===
- Atheist Union of Greece

=== Iceland ===
- Sidmennt – Icelandic Ethical Humanist Association

=== India ===
- Indian Rationalist Association
- Atheist Center
- Dakshina Kannada Rationalist Association
- Federation of Indian Rationalist Associations
- Indian Humanist Union
- Kerala Yukthivadi Sangham
- Dravidar Kazhagam
- We The Sapiens

=== Indonesia ===
- Indonesian Atheists

=== Ireland ===
- Atheist Ireland
- Humanist Association of Ireland
- Humani

=== Italy ===
- Italian Union of Rationalist Atheists and Agnostics (UAAR)

=== Kenya ===
- Atheists In Kenya Society (AIK)

=== Luxembourg ===
- Allianz vun Humanisten, Atheisten an Agnostiker (AHA!)

=== Netherlands ===
- De Vrije Gedachte (DVG, "The Free Thought")
- Humanistisch Verbond (HV, "Humanist Association")

=== New Zealand ===
- Humanist Society of New Zealand
- New Zealand Association of Rationalists and Humanists
- NZ Skeptics

=== Northern Ireland ===
- Humani

=== Norway ===
- Human-Etisk Forbund HEF has over 78,000 members, making it "the largest group [in Norway] outside the State Church"
- Norwegian Heathen Society

=== Philippines ===
- Filipino Freethinkers
- Philippine Atheism, Agnosticism, and Secularism Inc.

=== Romania ===
- Romanian Secular-Humanist Association

=== Russia ===
- Russian Humanist Society — member of the European Humanist Federation.
- Atheists of Russia — faction of the party Communists of Russia.
- Good Sense / Здравомыслие (Zdravomyslie) — member of the European Humanist Federation and the Atheist Alliance International.

=== Singapore ===
- Humanist Society of Singapore

=== Sweden ===
- Humanists Sweden

=== Switzerland ===
- Freethinkers Association of Switzerland

=== Turkey ===
- Association of Atheism

=== United Kingdom ===
==== National organisations ====
- Humanists UK, founded 1896, is the largest such group.
  - LGBT Humanists UK
  - Humanist Students
- Conway Hall Ethical Society, founded in 1793, identifies itself as "the oldest freethought community in the world"
- Humanist Society Scotland
- Scottish Secular Society, founded in 2012, identifies itself as Scotland's largest secular group.
- National Secular Society
- Rationalist Association, which publishes New Humanist
- Camp Quest UK

==== Local groups ====
There are many local humanist groups around the United Kingdom, most being affiliates of Humanists UK and the National Secular Society. Of these, Leicester Secular Society has particular claim to fame in being the world's oldest secular society, founded in 1851. Others include North East Humanists.

=== United States ===
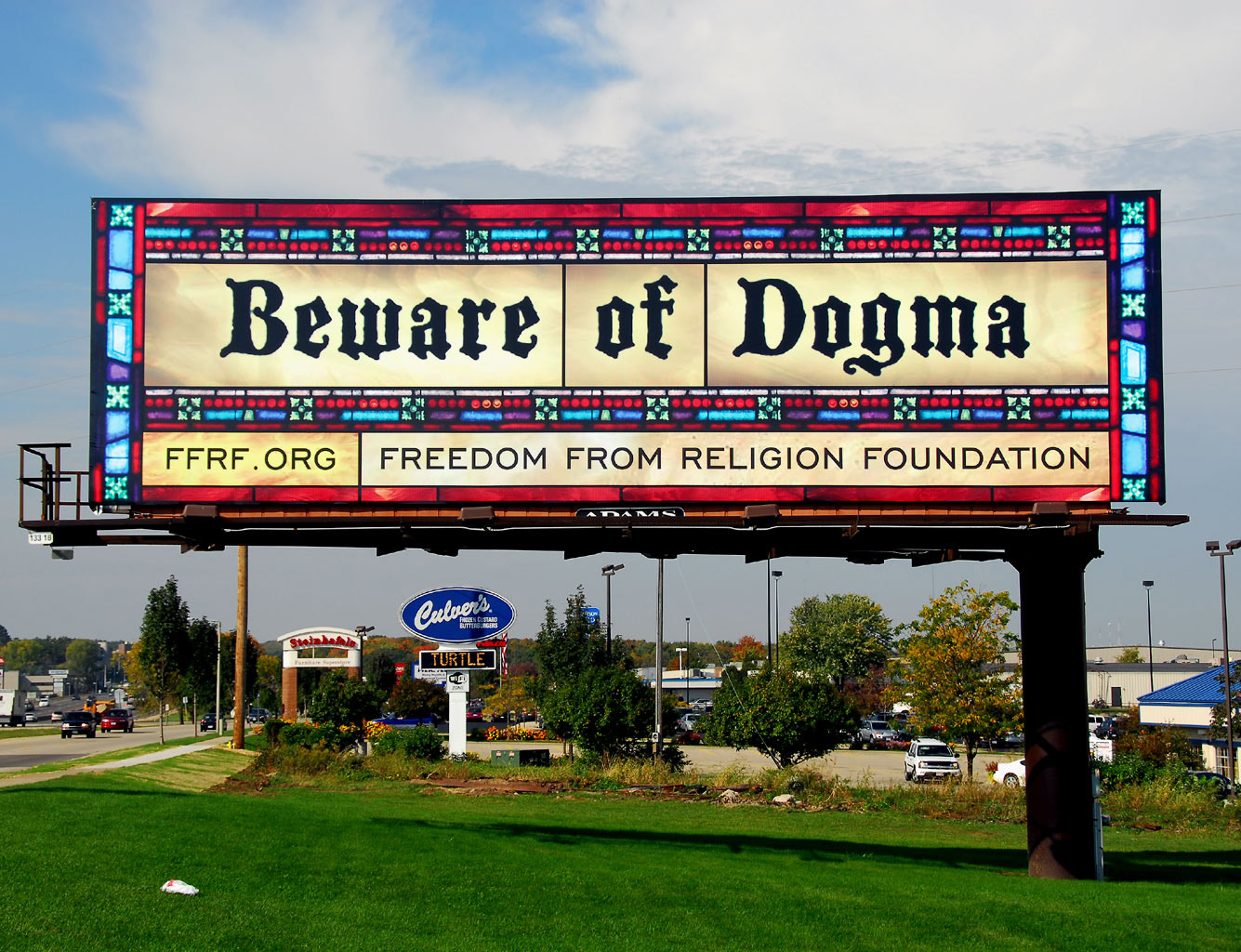
Freedom From Religion Foundation billboard

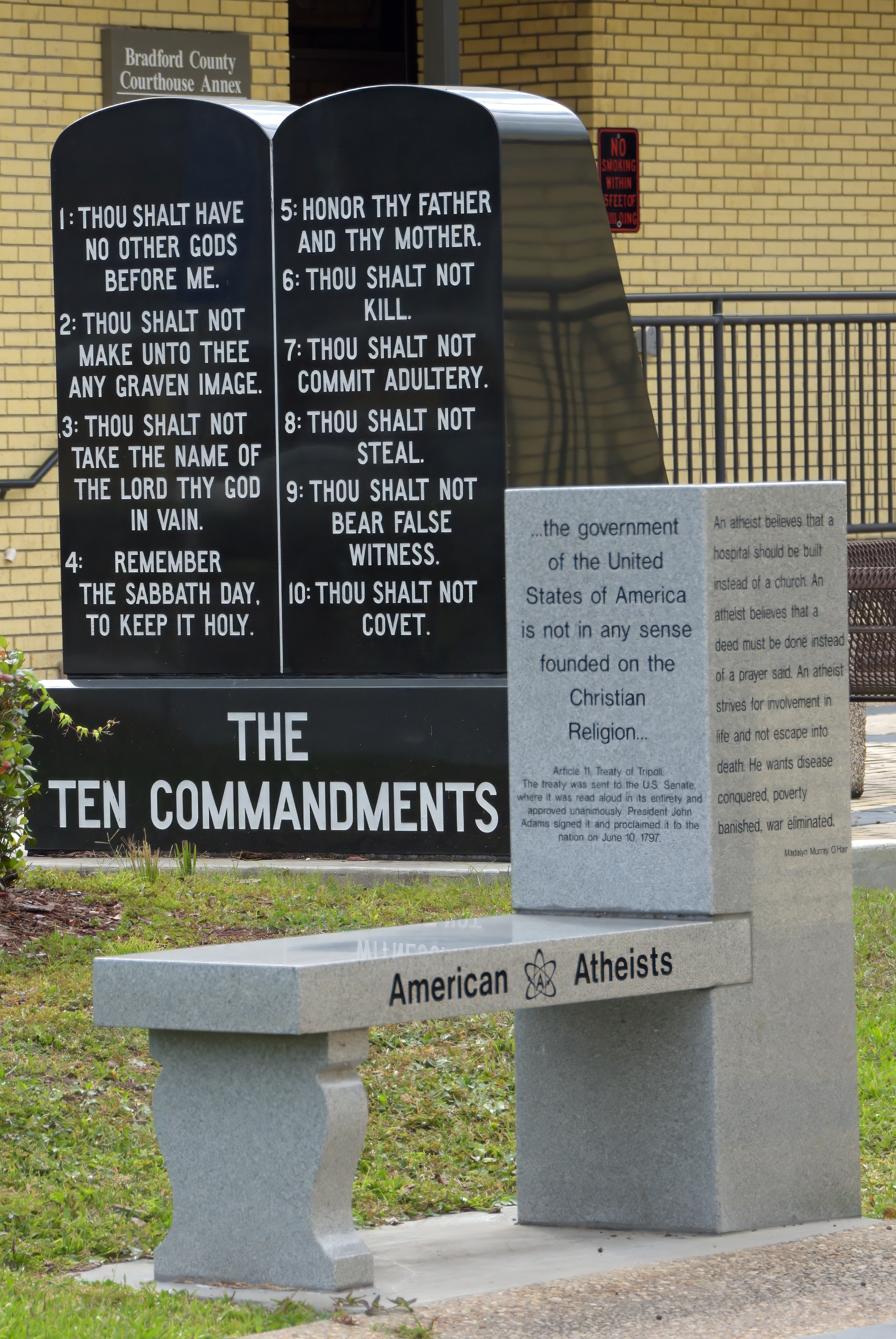
American Atheist bench and "Ten Commandments" display (Bradford County, Florida)

- American Atheists – dedicated to separation of church and state issues
- American Ethical Union – federation of about 25 Ethical Societies representing the Ethical Culture movement founded in 1876 by Felix Adler
- American Humanist Association – organization promoting secular humanism in the US
- American Secular Union
- Americans United for Separation of Church and State is a nonpartisan organization dedicated to preserving church-state separation to ensure religious freedom for all Americans
- The Atheist Agenda
- Atheist Alliance International
- Atheist Community of Austin
- Atheists of Florida – founded in 1992 to ensure the separation of state and church
- Baptist Joint Committee for Religious Liberty, represents multiple Baptist groups (but not the Southern Baptist Convention) in supporting religious liberty and the separation of church and state
- Camp Inquiry – summer camp run by the Center for Inquiry
- Camp Quest – "The Secular Summer Camp", a residential summer camp in the United States for the children of those who hold a naturalistic world view
- Center for Inquiry
  - Richard Dawkins Foundation for Reason and Science – former independent project created by Richard Dawkins, now a subdivision of CFI
- City Congregation for Humanistic Judaism
- Committee for Skeptical Inquiry
- Ex-Muslims of North America – non-profit based in the US, according to its website, stands "for the rights and dignities of those who leave Islam"
- Fellowship of Humanity
- First Humanist Society of New York
- Foundation Beyond Belief
- Freedom From Religion Foundation – according to its website, the "largest group of atheists and agnostics in North America"
- The Humanist Institute
- Institute for Humanist Studies
- Internet Infidels – "a nonprofit educational organization dedicated to defending and promoting a naturalistic worldview on the Internet"
- Military Association of Atheists & Freethinkers
- Military Religious Freedom Foundation
- North Texas Church of Freethought
- Practice What You Preach Foundation – a "non-profit organization that builds bridges between faith communities and secular organizations in the Greater Los Angeles Area"
- Rational Response Squad
- Secular Coalition for America
- Secular Student Alliance
- Secular Therapy Project
- Society for Humanistic Judaism – offers cultural and secular Jews a non-theistic alternative in contemporary Jewish life
- United Coalition of Reason

== See also ==
- List of skeptical organizations
- Lists of secularists: Agnostics, Atheists, Humanists, Nontheists, Skeptics
