= Irreligion in Australia =

Religion in Australia as declared in the 2021 census
1. No religion (38.9%)
2. Roman Catholicism (20.0%)
3. Anglicanism (9.80%)
4. Other Christian (14.1%)
5. Islam (3.20%)
6. Hinduism (2.70%)
7. Buddhism (2.40%)
8. Sikhism (0.80%)
9. Other religions (0.90%)
10. Not stated or unclear (7.20%)

Major religious affiliations in Australia by census year

Atheism, agnosticism, skepticism, freethought, secular humanism or general irreligion are increasing in Australia. Post-war Australia has become a highly secularised country. Religion does not play a major role in the lives of much of the population.

In the country's 2021 census, 38.9% of Australians (or 9,886,957 people) selected either "no religion" or specified their form of irreligion, almost nine percent higher (and 2,846,240 more people) than the 2016 census. 7.2% did not state their religion, or gave an unclear response, meaning that over 46% of Australians did not state a religious affiliation in the 2021 census, a 6.4% increase from the last census. In preparation for the 2026 census, the Australian Government considered making several changes to be more inclusive, as over 40% of responses in the last census declared having no religion. The ABS ultimately decided to use the same question design as in previous censuses.

When asked of their religious affiliation in the 2016 census, 29.6% of Australians (or 6,933,708 people) selected "no religion." This was more than seven percent higher (and 2,240,546 more people), than in the 2011 census. Additionally, in 2016, another 0.5% instead opted to specify their form of irreligion, writing it under "other," hence resulting in 30.1% of Australians (or just over 7,040,700 people) selecting "no religion." A further 9.6% either did not state a religion, or gave a response that was unclear, meaning that 39.7% of Australians did not expressly state a religious affiliation in the 2016 census.

In the 2011 census, 22.3% of Australians (or 4,796,787 people) described themselves as having "no religion." This was more than three percent higher (and 1,090,232 people more) than in the 2006 census and was the second largest category. Another 2.014 million (9.4%) were in the "not-stated or inadequately-defined" category: so more than 31% of Australians did not state a religious affiliation in the 2011 census.

In the 2006 census, 18.7% of Australians (or 3,706,555 people) had described themselves as having "no religion." This was three percent higher than in the 2001 census and was the largest growth in total number of any religious option in that census (800,557 people). A further 2.4 million (11.9%) did not state a religion (or inadequately described it). So just over 30% of Australians did not state a religious affiliation in the 2006 census.

In a 2004 worldwide study by Pippa Norris and Ronald Inglehart, 25% of Australians stated they do not believe in any gods.

== History ==
The first systematic recording of the religious affiliation of non-aboriginal Australians took place in the 1901 census. Since the 1901 census, the percentage of the census population not aligned with a religion has grown from 0.4% to just over 30% of the population. The census question about religion has been clearly labelled as "optional" since 1933. In 1971 the census instructed, "If no religion, write none." This was followed by "a seven-fold increase" in the figures from previous years for those declaring lack of religious beliefs.

Melbourne hosted the 2010 and 2012 Global Atheist Conventions.

In 2010 The Australian Book of Atheism was published as "the first collection to explore atheism from an Australian viewpoint". The book was prompted by the disparity between Australia's increasing secularism and the increasing political and educational influence and funding of religion in Australia and contains essays by 33 authors (including Leslie Cannold, Robyn Williams, Tim Minchin, Graham Oppy, Philip Nitschke, Ian Hunter, Lyn Allison, Russell Blackford and Ian Robinson) on atheism-related topics in areas including history, law, education, philosophy and neurobiology.

== Irreligion in politics ==
Section 116 of the Constitution of Australia established Freedom of religion in 1901.

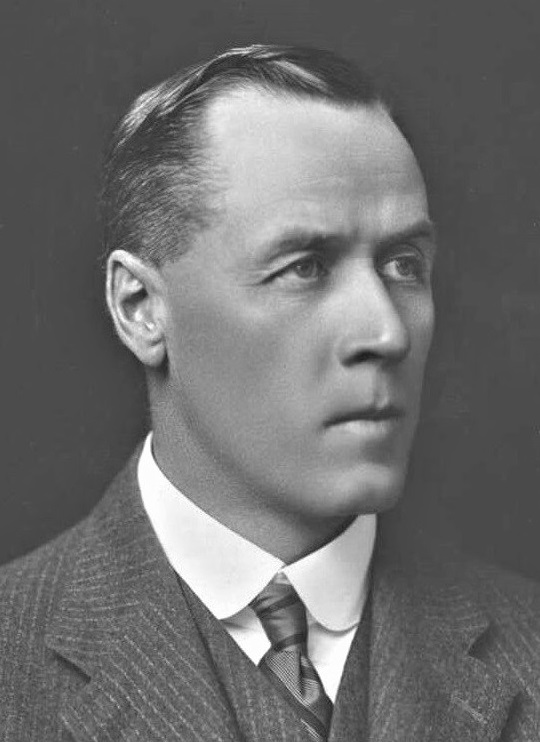
John Latham, who in the 1930s served as Deputy Prime Minister and later as Chief Justice of the High Court of Australia, was an atheist and early member of the Rationalist Society of Australia.

Australians tend to be very suspicious of religion being intertwined with politics. Critic and commentator Robert Hughes stated "Any Australian political candidate who declared their God was on their side would be laughed off the podium as an idiot or a wowser (prude, intrusive bluenose)." Conversely, Australia has had many openly atheist or agnostic political figures elected to high positions, including prime ministers Gough Whitlam (whose philosophical position has been called "post-Christian") John Curtin, John Gorton, Bob Hawke and Julia Gillard. Governor-General Bill Hayden was voted as the Australian Humanist of the Year by the Council of Australian Humanist Societies (although he subsequently converted to Catholicism in 2018, many years after leaving office). Politicians Gareth Evans, Olive Zakharov and Lionel Murphy have also received this award.

A 2010 survey by The Sunday Age asked all 30 members of the First Rudd Ministry about their religious beliefs. Fifteen declined to comment, ten said they were "Christian" and three stated that they were atheists: health minister Nicola Roxon, defence personnel minister Greg Combet and financial services minister Chris Bowen. The remaining two, finance minister Lindsay Tanner and treasurer Wayne Swan, both described themselves as agnostic Christians, with Swan believing that "values, rather than religion, are important in public life". Tanner added, "I doubt whether it would make much difference to a political career for someone to describe themselves as atheist."

According to a 2009 Nielsen survey, 84% of 1000 respondents agree that religion and politics should be separate.

The Fusion Party refers to itself as a secular humanist party. It supports the separation of church and state and removing religious prayers, rituals, and bias from government and public institutions and their documentation, and abolishing blasphemy laws.

The political party Reason Australia supports a secular Australia.

== Polls, surveys and statistics ==
People who are affiliated with no religion as a percentage of the total population in Australia at the 2011 census, divided geographically by statistical local area

Although many Australians identify themselves as religious, the majority consider religion the least important aspect of their lives when compared with family, partners, work and career, leisure time and politics. This is reflected in Australia's church attendance rates, which are among the lowest in the world and in decline (reference from 2004). In explaining this phenomenon, writer and broadcaster Paul Collins said "Australians are quietly spiritual rather than explicitly religious" and the prominent historian Manning Clark defined Australian spirituality as "a shy hope in the heart ... understated, wary of enthusiasm, anti-authoritarian, optimistic, open to others, self-deprecating and ultimately characterized by a serious quiet reverence, a deliberate silence, an inarticulate awe and a serious distaste for glib wordiness."

Donald Horne, one of Australia's well-known public intellectuals, believed rising prosperity in post-war Australia influenced the decline in church-going and general lack of interest in religion. "Churches no longer matter very much to most Australians. If there is a happy eternal life it's for everyone ... For many Australians the pleasures of this life are sufficiently satisfying that religion offers nothing of great appeal", said Horne in his landmark work The Lucky Country (1964).

The 2021 census found that 38.9% of Australian-born Australians claim no religion. In 2011 adults aged 18–34 were more than twice as likely as those in 1976 to have no religion (29% compared with 12%). The highest proportion of people who had no religion were young adults. The ABS has revealed that in 2011, the number of males claiming no religion was higher than females, that women claiming no religion were more likely to have no children, and that marriages were mostly performed by civil celebrants. Tasmania had the highest rate of citizens reporting no religion, at 50% while the rate was lowest in New South Wales (33%).

Chinese Australians: Among immigrants, Chinese immigrants stand out as being significantly less religious compared to other groups, with a high proportion identifying as having no religion. People of English/Scottish/Irish Backgrounds form the largest group of those identifying with no religion.

=== Census data ===
Irreligious declarations of Australians by State or Territory according to the censuses from 2001 to 2021

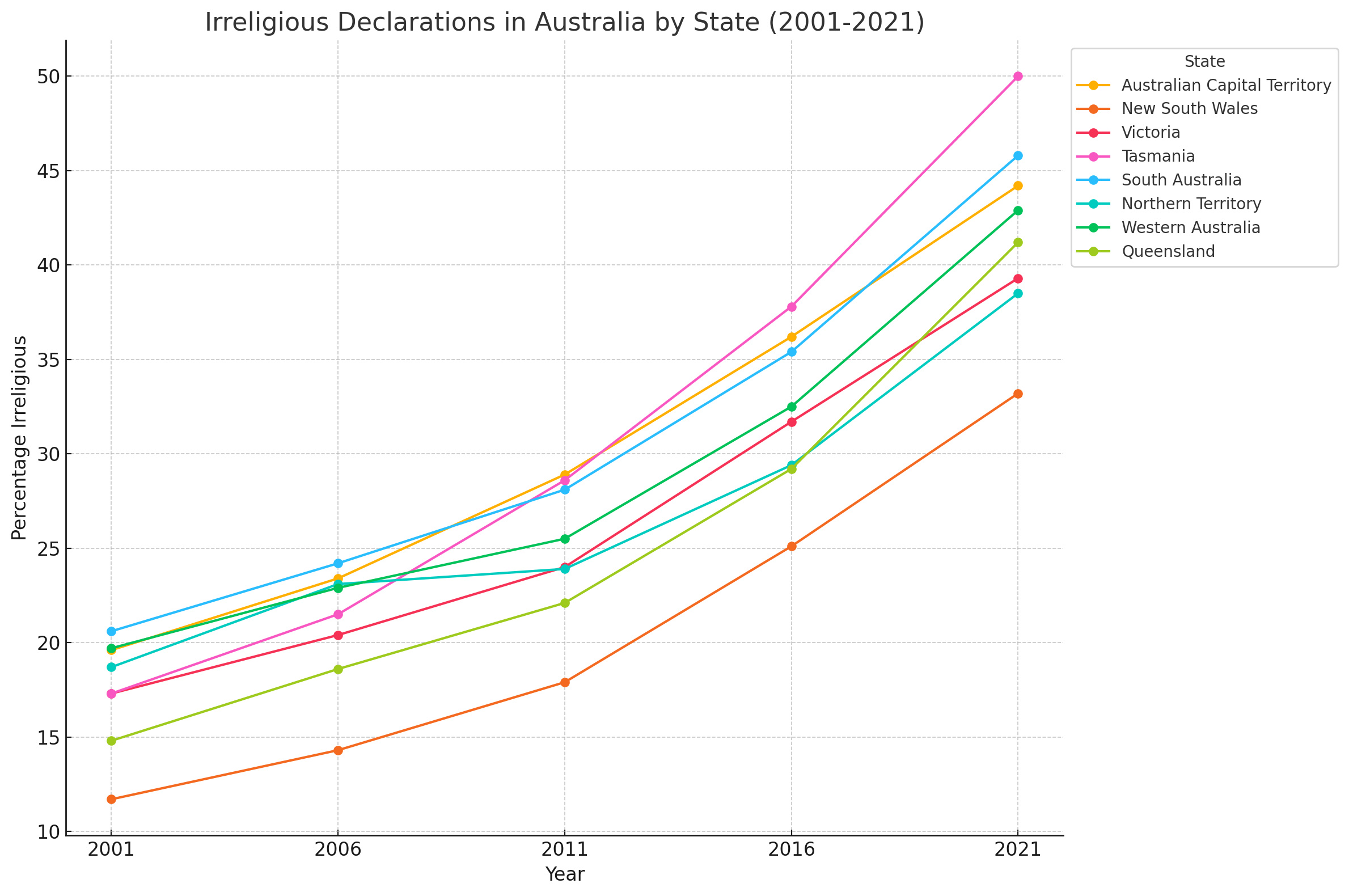
This graph illustrates the increasing trend of irreligiosity across Australian states from 2001 to 2021, with Tasmania showing the highest percentage in 2021

State/Territory	% 2021	% 2016	% 2011	% 2006	% 2001
Australian Capital Territory	44.2	36.2	28.9	23.4	19.6
New South Wales	33.2	25.1	17.9	14.3	11.7
Victoria	39.3	31.7	24.0	20.4	17.3
Tasmania	50.0	37.8	28.6	21.5	17.3
South Australia	45.8	35.4	28.1	24.2	20.6
Northern Territory	38.5	29.4	23.9	23.1	18.7
Western Australia	42.9	32.5	25.5	22.9	19.7
Queensland	41.2	29.2	22.1	18.6	14.8
Total	38.9	29.6	22.3	18.7	15.5

=== Marriage data ===
Irreligious marriages in Australia accounted for 80.3% of marriages in 2019 and 2020 slightly more than in England and Wales in 2017 (78 per cent). The Australian figure is up from 41.3% of marriages in 1988 and just over 50% in 1999. Secular funerals have also risen in popularity: in 2014 the Sydney Morning Herald surveyed 104 funeral directors and 514 people over 50, finding that 6 in 10 funerals were conducted by civil celebrants.

=== Belief ===
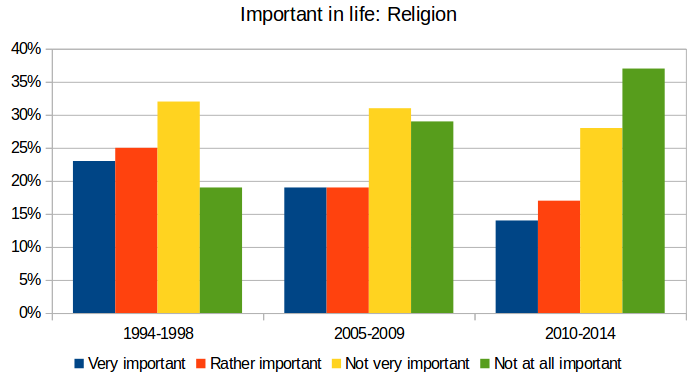
The proportion of Australian respondents to the World Values Survey saying religion is "Not at all important" to them has increased from 19% in 1994-98 to 37% in 2010-2014

A Roy Morgan survey of 4,840 Australians between October and December 2013 found that 52.6% of Australians were Christian, while 37.6% had no religion. Norman Morris, the company's communications director, noted that the change in religious affiliation could indicate a growth of atheism and agnosticism, or a move away from identification with organised Christianity by theistic believers. He identified possible causes for the change, including "morally conservative religious doctrines" contrasting with progressive attitudes on abortion, same-sex marriage, the use of condoms in the global fight against the HIV pandemic. He also noted the drop coincided with public media attention around alleged religious cover-ups of child sexual abuse in the Child Abuse Royal Commission.

A 2006 study by Monash University, the Australian Catholic University and the Christian Research Association found that 52 per cent of Australians born between 1976 and 1990 had no belief in a god.

A 2008 global Gallup poll found nearly 70% of Australians stated religion as having no importance, much higher than their American counterparts and on par with similarly secular countries such as Japan, the Netherlands, Finland and France. Only a few Scandinavian countries (Norway, Sweden, Denmark) and post-Soviet states (Estonia) are markedly less religious. A 2008 Christian Science Monitor survey of 17 countries reported that youth from Australia and the United Kingdom were the least likely to observe religious practice or see any "spiritual dimension" to life.

A 2002 study by Gregory Paul found that 24% of Australians are atheist or agnostic. A 2009 Nielsen survey of 1,000 respondents, found 68% of Australians believe in god and/or a "universal spirit", while 24% believe in neither. The survey found that 49% of respondents claimed religion was not important in their lives. A 2009 survey of 1,718 Australians conducted by NCLS research found that 61.5% say that "religious faith or spirituality" was of little or no importance to career and lifestyle decisions.

In 2011, an Ipsos MORI survey found that 32% claimed no religion, while a Galaxy poll found 43% claimed no religion. A 2011 report by the American Physical Society claimed that religion may die out in Australia and eight other Western world countries.

According to NORC of Chicago, 20.6% of Australians don't believe in God and never have, while 9.7% are "strong atheists". Of those aged under 28, 26.8% have never believed in God and just 14.7% are certain God exists. A 2012 poll by Win-Gallup International found that 48% of Australians were not religious; 37% were religious; 10% declared themselves "convinced atheists". Australia placed in the bottom 14 for religiosity and in the top 11 for atheism.

An October 2011 McCrindle survey polled 1,094 respondents on attitudes Christianity, finding 50% of the respondents did not identify with a religion, and 17% claimed Jesus did not exist. A follow-up survey that 30% claimed no religion, 64% identified with Christianity and 6% belonged to other religions. 9% of the Christians were actively practising and regularly attending.

A 2011 survey by McCrindle Research found that for Australians, Christmas is predominantly secular. 46% of respondents said the highlights of Christmas were celebrations with family and friends, 36% said gift giving, Christmas trees and the general Christmas spirit; and 15% said attending religious services, carol singing and nativity plays. 19% said they would "definitely" attend a religious service, while 38% have never attended. 87% of people who are not religious celebrated Christmas to some extent.

A 2022 study on 3,090 young Australians, discovered gender differences in certain beliefs: 26% of Men believed 'There is a personal God' which was 18% for Women, 34% of Women chose 'There is some sort of spirit or lifeforce' which was 26% for Men, 30% of Men selected 'I don't really know what to think' and it was 26% for Women, and 23% of Women picked 'I don't really think there is any sort of spirit, God or life force' which was 18% for Men.

=== Religious attendance ===
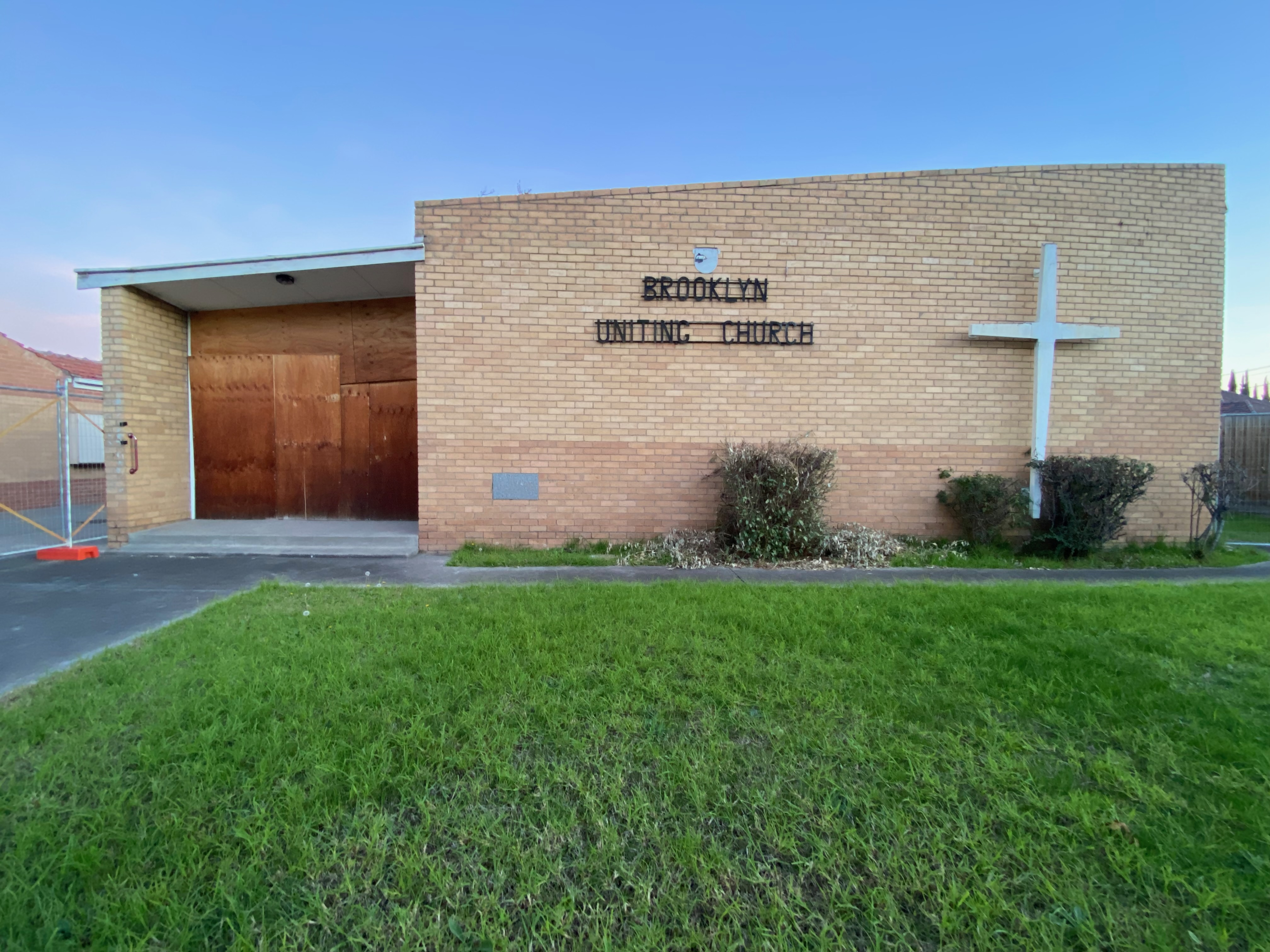
An abandoned Uniting Church building in Melbourne

According to the National Church Life Survey, between 1950 and 2007 monthly church attendance declined from 44% to 17%. A 2009 Christian Research Association survey of 1,718 Australians concurred, finding that 16% attended a religious service at least once a month, down from 23% in 1993. Subsequently, there have been claims that the rate of decline in church attendance has slowed; in 2016 there was a claim that monthly attendance at church was 16%. Yet, a 2013 survey by McCrindle Research found just 8% of Christians attend church at least once a month. The McCrindle survey also discovered that 47% of respondents do not go to church because it is "irrelevant to my life", 26% "don't accept how it's taught", while 19% "don't believe in the bible".

In 1996, 17.9% of Roman Catholics attended Mass on a typical Sunday, falling to 12.2% in 2011. In 2006, the median age of all Catholics aged 15 years and over was 44 years. In 1996, 27% of Roman Catholics aged 50 to 54 years regularly attended Mass, falling to 15% in 2006. While 30% aged 55–59 years regularly attended in 1996, only 19% attended in 2006. From 1996 to 2006 Mass attendance for Roman Catholics aged between 15 and 34 declined by just over 38%, going from 136,000 to 83,760 attendees.

In 2009, more than 40% of those brought up as Anglicans or Lutherans, 36% of those brought up in the Uniting Church and 28% of those brought up as Roman Catholics described themselves as having no religion. 33% of 15- to 29-year-olds identified with a Christian denomination in 2009, down from 60% in 1993.

A study in 2011 by the Christian Research Association discovered that the attendance of Uniting churches has declined by 30% over the previous 10 years. The association's president, Philip Hughes, has predicted that the decline in church attendance would continue "at least for the next 20 years". The study also found that the average age of people attending Catholic and Anglican churches is around 60 years.

== See also ==
- Atheist Foundation of Australia
- Australian Aboriginal mythology
- Australian Skeptics
- Catholic Church sexual abuse cases in Australia
- Council of Australian Humanist Societies
- Fusion Party (Australia)
- Irreligion
- National Secular Lobby
- Rationalist Society of Australia
- Reason Party (Australia)
- Recovering from Religion
- Religion in Australia
- Religious skepticism
- Secular humanism
- Secular Party of Australia
- Separation of church and state in Australia
- Stolen Generations
