= Atheist Foundation of Australia =

South Australian organization

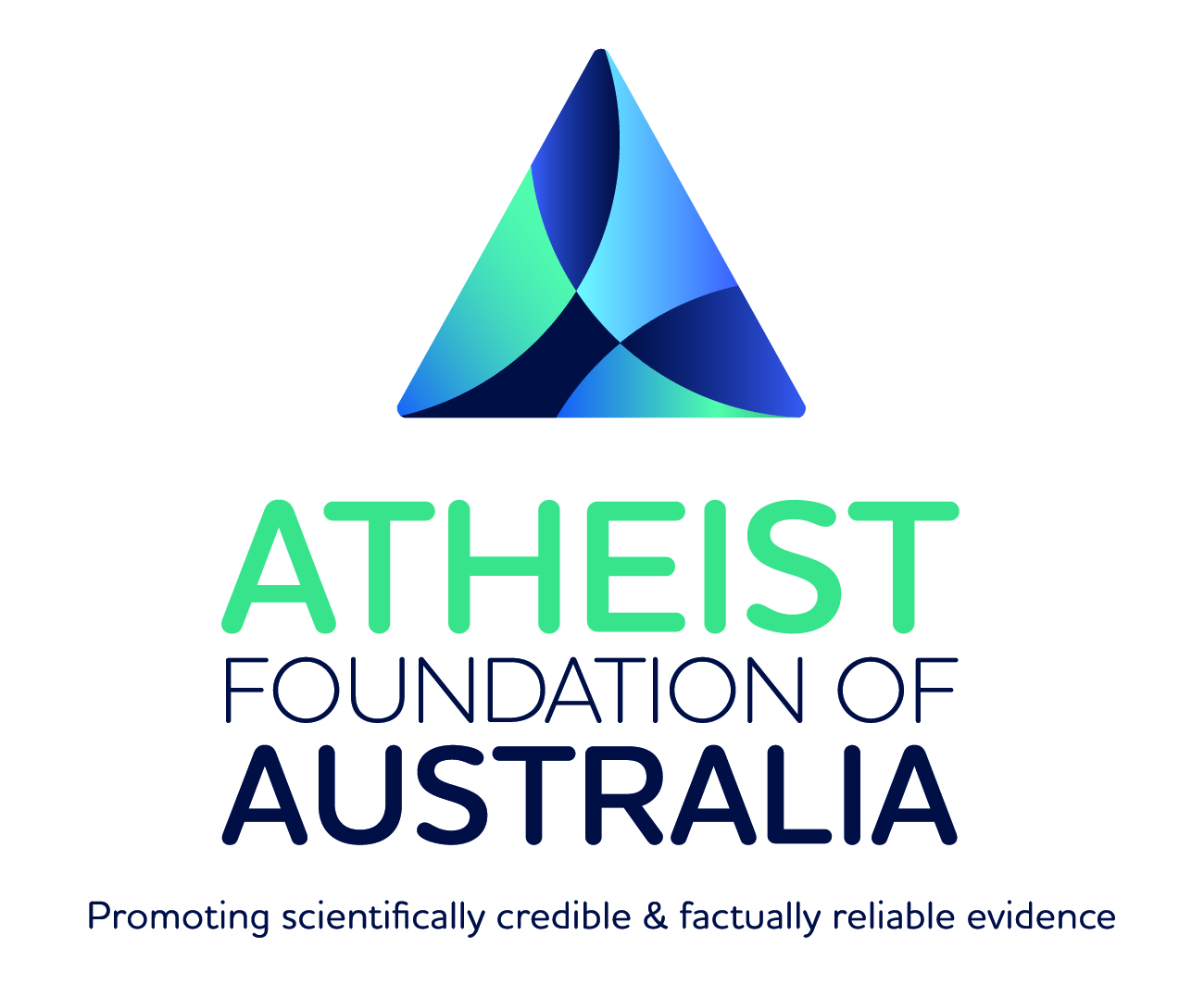
- Founded: 1970
- Region served: Australia
- Key people: Neil Raine (President)
- Website: atheistfoundation.org.au

The Atheist Foundation of Australia (AFA) was established in South Australia in 1970, when The Rationalist Association of South Australia decided upon a name change to better declare its basic philosophy, namely atheism.

The foundation defines atheism as "the acceptance that there is no credible scientific or factually reliable evidence for the existence of a god, gods or the supernatural." It rejects belief in a deity, the supernatural and superstition in general. The foundation considers religion unnecessary and often harmful. It favours the scientific method, and the discovery of physical laws, as the best way to understand the truth about reality. The foundation believes that humans are rational and ethical beings, capable of moral responsibility and creative contributions to society.

== Aims ==
The objects of the Foundation are:

1. To encourage and to provide a means of expression for informed free-thought on philosophical and social issues.
2. To safeguard the rights of all non-religious people.
3. To serve as a focal point for the community of non-religious people.
4. To offer verifiable information in place of superstition and to promote logic and reason.
5. To promote atheism.

== Activism ==
The foundation organised the 2010 Global Atheist Convention in conjunction with Atheist Alliance International, and organised a second Global Atheist Convention in 2012. A third convention, planned for February 2018, was cancelled by the organising committee due to insufficient interest.

The foundation ran a campaign encouraging people to mark "No religion" on the 2011 Australian Census. Then-President David Nicholls stated that many people "simply marked down the religion they were born into, despite not now being religious people at all", and that as census results are used to gauge public funding to religious groups, this was giving religion more tax-payers' money than it was entitled to. The AFA hired billboards around the country promoting the campaign. The 2011 census results showed that the percentage of people declaring no religion had risen from 18.7% in 2006 to 22.3%, becoming the second largest response. The AFA ran a similar campaign for the 2016 census; results showed the percentage of people declaring no religion rose to 30.1%, becoming the top response. In 2016, then-President Kylie Sturgess objected to non-religious individuals answering with joke answers in the census in response to the Jedi census phenomenon, as this would result in an underrepresentation of non-religious Australians.

== See also ==
- Council of Australian Humanist Societies
- Human rights in Australia
- Irreligion in Australia
- Religion in Australia - includes Australian Bureau of Statistics census information relating to religion and belief.
- Rationalist Society of Australia
- The Secular Party of Australia
- The National Secular Lobby
- Major world religions
- List of secularist organizations
