= Council of Australian Humanist Societies =

Council of Australian Humanist Societies Inc
- Formation: 1965
- Region served: Australia
- President: Murray Love
- Affiliations: Humanists International
- Website: www.humanist.org.au

The Council of Australian Humanist Societies (CAHS) is an umbrella organisation for Australian humanist societies. It was founded in 1965. It is affiliated with Humanists International. The official symbol of CAHS (and all member organisations) is the Happy Human.

CAHS holds conventions and publishes on humanism. CAHS accepts Humanist International's Minimum statement on Humanism:

Humanism is a democratic and ethical life stance, which affirms that human beings have the right and responsibility to give meaning and shape to their own lives. It stands for the building of a more humane society through an ethic based on human and other natural values in the spirit of reason and free inquiry through human capabilities. It is not theistic, and it does not accept supernatural views of reality.

== See also ==
- Agnosticism
- Amsterdam Declaration 2002
- Atheism
- Atheist Foundation of Australia
- Fusion Party (Australia)
- Human rights in Australia
- Humanism and Its Aspirations
- Irreligion in Australia
- Major world religions
- National Secular Lobby
- Rationalism
- Rationalist Society of Australia
- Reason Party (Australia)
- Religion in Australia - includes Australian Bureau of Statistics census information relating to religion and belief.
- Secular state
- Secularism
- Separation of church and state in Australia
- Separation of church and state
- States and territories of Australia
- The Secular Party of Australia
