= National Church Life Survey =

NCLS Research is an Australian organisation that surveys Australian community attitudes and runs studies on churches in Australia every 5 years called National Church Life Surveys. NCLS Research conducts surveys on community spirituality and well-being.

== History ==
=== Supporters ===
Key supporters of the National Church Life Survey are:

- Uniting Church NSW & ACT Synod: Uniting Mission and Education and Uniting
- ANGLICARE Diocese of Sydney
- BaptistCare

Participating Denominations also support the NCLS, some by providing a regional survey coordinator.

Other research and mission organisations also partner with the NCLS, including Openbook and Christian Blind Mission International.

The 2001 NCLS was conducted in international partnership with organisations from Australia, England, New Zealand and the United States.

=== Aims ===
NCLS research describe themselves as "an immense cooperative research venture designed to resource congregations for mission" that explores "aspects of both church and community life"

The purpose of the National Church Life Survey project is to:

- Analyse trends into church life comparing with previous surveys
- Carry out more detailed analysis of the relationships between factors that are apparent in healthy churches
- Provide resources to Churches to assist ministry relevance
- Carry out more detailed analysis on effective and sustainable leadership

== Recent activities ==
In January 2008, the Sydney Morning Herald reported research by the Christian Research Association and the NCLS into religious affiliation in rural areas. The article states that

(w)heat and sheep farming areas tend to have higher levels of Christian identification than mining boom towns.

The Wellbeing and Security Survey 2003 was conducted in co-operation with Edith Cowan University, Perth, Australia and ANGLICARE (Sydney).

The National Church Life Survey 2001 was conducted in May 2001. The survey was completed by 435,000 church attendees from 7000+ Australian churches, across 19 denominations, representing 80%+ of Australian regular church-goers. NCLS Research claims that NCLS 2001 is one of the largest surveys of its kind in the world.

The NCLS First Look Report 2001 states:

Most attenders are at ease with sharing their faith or even look for opportunities to do so (66%). Some 37% have invited someone to church in the past year, even though many churches don’t seem to have a culture of inviting people to church. It is encouraging that 6% of attenders are newcomers who have joined church in the last five years without a previous church background.

In contrast, the AD2000 Journal article National Church Life Survey: church-going declines further summarises the research as follows:

Statistics from the latest National Church Life Survey (NCLS) indicate that attendances at church services in the large Christian denominations, including the Catholic Church, are continuing to decline.

Figures from the 2001 survey showed that Catholic mass attendance declined by an estimated 13% and overall weekly church attendance in Australia declined by 7%.

Initial results from the 2011 survey show that six out of 10 adult church members are female. Four out of 10 are younger than 50 years of age. They are well-educated – a third have university degrees compared to just under a quarter of all working-age Australians. The average age is 55 years, pointing to a long-term ageing trend. Individually, church members are much more likely to be volunteers in their communities than the average Australian. The survey found that Christians go to churches for community, with 75 per cent report a strong sense of belonging to their local church.

The Survey in 2021 was again aligned to the 2021 Census.

== See also ==
- Christianity in Australia
- Irreligion in Australia
- Religion in Australia
