= Jane Caro =

Australian writer and social commentator

Jane Caro AM
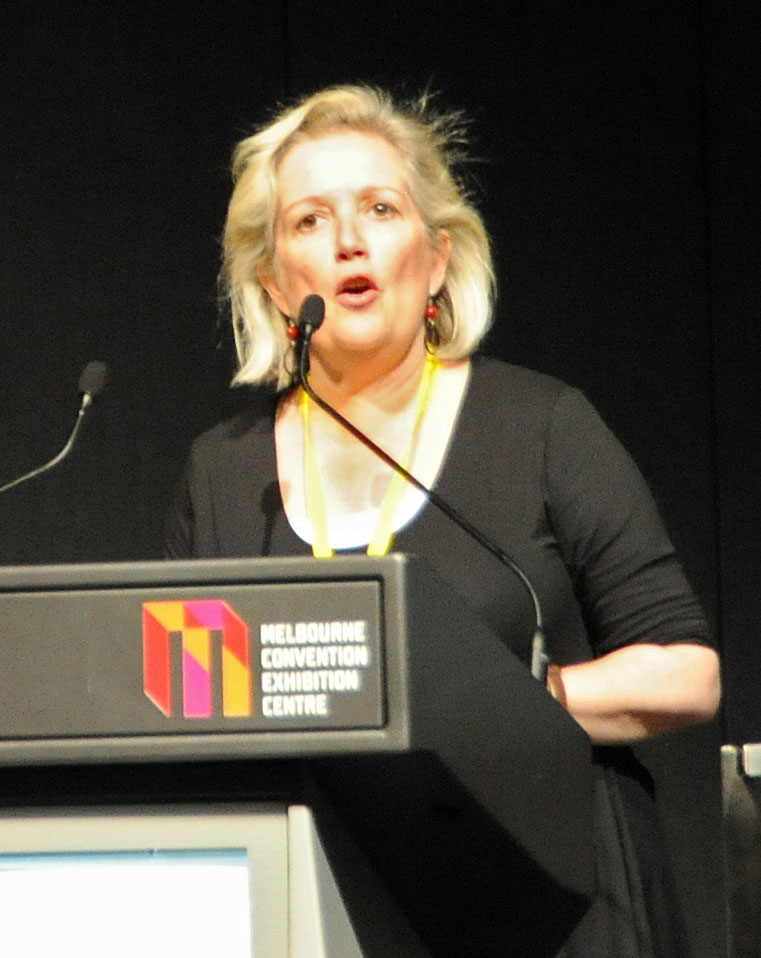
- Caro at the 2010 Global Atheist Convention

Personal details
- Born: Catherine Jane Caro; 24 June 1957 (age 69) London, England
- Party: Reason
- Spouse: Ralph Dunning
- Children: 2
- Education: Macquarie University (BA 1977)
- Website: janecaro.com.au

Catherine Jane Caro AM (born 24 June 1957), known as Jane Caro, is an Australian social commentator, writer, and lecturer.

== Early life and education ==
Catherine Jane Caro was born in London on 24 June 1957 and emigrated to Australia with her parents as a five-year-old in 1963.

She attended Macquarie University, where she graduated with a Bachelor of Arts with a major in English literature in 1977.

== Career ==
Caro started her career in marketing, but soon moved into advertising. She has since worked for various broadcast media as a journalist and social commentator, and has written several books.

She has appeared on Channel Seven's Sunrise, ABC television's Q&A and as a regular panellist on The Gruen Transfer.

Caro lectured in advertising at the School of Humanities and Communication Arts at University of Western Sydney.

== Politics ==
Caro had been tipped to run against Tony Abbott in the 2019 Australian federal election, for his long-held Sydney seat in the Australian House of Representatives, the Division of Warringah, but instead publicly advocated voting for the Australian Greens, Sarah Hanson-Young specifically.

Caro stood as a Reason Party candidate for a New South Wales Australian Senate seat in the 2022 Australian federal election.

== Writing ==
Caro has written many articles for publications such as The Saturday Paper; The Conversation; The Guardian; The Sydney Morning Herald; the ABC; and Online Opinion.

She has also written many books.

== Other activities ==
Caro has been on the boards of the NSW Public Education Foundation (2012) and Bell Shakespeare (2020).

She was a speaker at the 2014 Festival of Dangerous Ideas in Sydney.

As of 2021 she was an ambassador for the National Secular Lobby.

== Awards and recognition ==
She was recognized in 2013 by the Council of Australian Humanist Societies as the Australian Humanist of the Year.

In 2018, Caro won the Women in Leadership Award in the 2018 Walkley Awards.

She was appointed a Member of the Order of Australia (AM) in the 2019 Queen's Birthday Honours in recognition of her "significant service to the broadcast media as a journalist, social commentator and author".

In 2023 she was awarded the Lifetime Achievement Award at the B & T Women in Media Awards.

== Personal life ==
Caro is a feminist and atheist, and also a proponent of public education.

She married Ralph Dunning, and has two children.

== Publications ==
=== As author ===
- ——; Bonnor, Chris (2007). The Stupid Country: How Australia Is Dismantling Public Education. ISBN 9781742246246.
- ——; Fox, Catherine (2008). The F Word: How We Learned to Swear by Feminism. UNSW Press. ISBN 9780868408231.
- —— (2011). Just a Girl. University of Queensland Press. ISBN 9780702238802.
- ——; Bonner, Chris (2012). What Makes a Good School?. New South Books. ISBN 9781742241418.
- —— (2015). Just a Queen. Univ. of Queensland Press. ISBN 9780702253621.
- —— (2015). Plain-Speaking Jane. Pan Macmillan Australia Pty, Limited. ISBN 9781743534847.
- —— (2017). "Unbreakable": Women Share Stories of Resilience and Hope. University of Queensland Press. ISBN 9780702259678.
- —— (2018). Just Flesh and Blood. University of Queensland Press. ISBN 9780702260018.
- —— (2019). Accidental Feminists. Melbourne University Press. ISBN 9780522872835.
- —— (2022). The Mother. Allen & Unwin. ISBN 9781760879662.
- —— (2025). Lyrebird. Allen & Unwin. ISBN 9781761471537.

=== As editor ===
- Caro, Jane, ed. (2013). Destroying the Joint: Why Women Have to Change the World. University of Queensland Press. ISBN 9780702249907.

=== As contributor ===
- —— (2013). For God's Sake: An Atheist, a Jew, a Christian and a Muslim Debate Religion. Pan Macmillan Australia. ISBN 9781742612232.
