= Practice What You Preach (disambiguation) =

Practice What You Preach is a 1989 thrash metal album by Testament.

Practice what you preach may also refer to:

- "Practice What You Preach" (song), a 1994 R&B single by Barry White
- "Practice What You Preach", a song from the 1989 thrash metal album.
- "Practice What You Preach", a song from the 1974 album Borboletta by Santana
- Practice What You Preach Foundation, a non-profit organization
