= Rationalist Society of Australia =

Australian organization

The Rationalist Society of Australia (RSA) promotes the interests of rationalists nationally in Australia. Originally formed as the Victorian Rationalist Association, the society originated in a meeting of freethinkers in the University of Melbourne in 1906. It is the operational arm of the rationalist movement in Australia.

The society created a rationalist library in 1909, and grew its collection though donations. The society ran the 1910 and 1913 Australian tours of rationalist thinker, Joseph McCabe. A number of trade unionists and social campaigners sought to advance political causes, including Robert Samuel Ross and Alfred Foster. John Samuel Langley became the secretary in 1919, and William Glanville Cook became the secretary in 1938.

Its aims include:

- to propound and advance rationalism, that is, adherence to the principle that all significant beliefs and actions should be based on reason and evidence, that the natural world is the only world there is and that answers to the key questions of human existence are to be found only in that natural world
- to stimulate freedom of thought, and to promote inquiry into religious beliefs and practices
- to encourage interest in science, criticism and philosophy, as connected factors in a progressive human culture, independent of theological creeds and dogmas
- to promote the fullest possible use of science for human welfare
- to promote a secular and ethical system of education
- to print, publish or re-issue any journal, magazine, newspaper or other periodical publication and standard or notable books on science, criticism, ethics or philosophy, and to support the printing, publication or reissuing of the same by any other person
- to aid the progress of rationalism by means of literature, popular scientific lectures, and other promotions.

The RSA publishes the Australian Rationalist journal. Issues are archived in the National Library of Australia, and previous issues of the journal can be found on their website. Victoria University maintains a Rationalist Collection from the society. Contributors have included Brian Fitzpatrick and Ian Robinson.

The Australian Bureau of Statistics in the national census categorises rationalists under "No Religion". In the 2016 census, 29.6% of respondents (or 6,933,708 people) selected "no religion" or irreligious, a category that includes rationalists as well as Humanists, agnostics and atheists.

== See also ==
=== Australian topics ===
- Irreligion in Australia
- Atheist Foundation of Australia
- Australian Skeptics
- Council of Australian Humanist Societies
- Human rights in Australia
- Religion in Australia - includes Australian Bureau of Statistics census information relating to religion and belief.
- The Secular Party of Australia
- The National Secular Lobby

=== Other topics ===
- Major world religions - Humanism, rationalism, atheism and agnosticism rank third in world (combined)
- Freethought Association of Canada
