= Robyn Williams =

Australian science journalist (born 1944)

Robyn Williams AO FAA
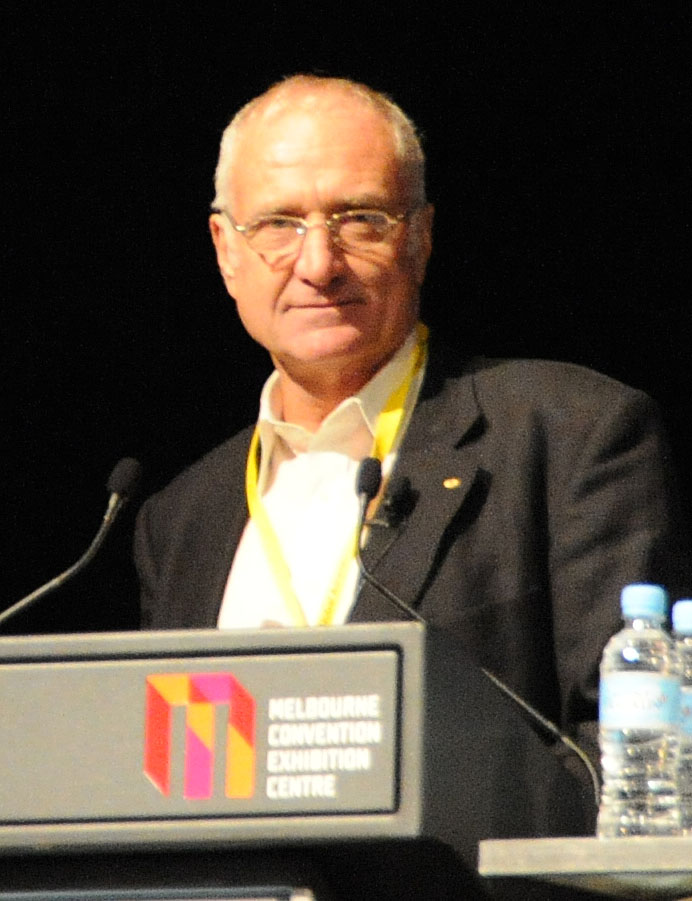
- Born: 30 January 1944 (age 82); United Kingdom
- Occupations: Science journalist; broadcaster

Robyn Williams AO FAA (born 30 January 1944) is a British-Australian science journalist and broadcaster who has hosted The Science Show on ABC Radio National (RN) since 1975, and created Ockham's Razor in 1984.

== Early life and education ==
Williams was born on 30 January 1944 in Wales or High Wycombe, Buckinghamshire, England. (Note: Sources vary as to place of birth; the Encyclopedia of Australian Science and Innovation says Buckinghamshire, and Encyclopedia.com says High Wycombe, Bucks. Using 2022 ABC source for now.) His father, Gwyn, a Welshman, has been variously reported as a union executive and journalist, or a coalminer who also studied engineering. His mother, Ray (nee Davis), had a Ukrainian background. She was Jewish, from London's East End, and worked as a translator.

Williams attended various schools in London, including the Bec School in Tooting Bec, as well as spending a few years at a German language school in Vienna, Austria.

Williams first spent time in Australia in 1964 and worked as a temporary clerk at the Decimal Currency Board of Australia, among other jobs. He moved back to London with his Australian wife to study science. He graduated from the University of London with a Bachelor of Science (Honours) degree. During this period he was active in university acting and was hired as an extra in BBC series The Goodies, Monty Python's Flying Circus and Doctor Who.

== Professional life ==
He joined the Australian Broadcasting Corporation (ABC) Science Unit in 1972 where, after several years in background production and interviewing for the Insight program, he hosted Innovations in early 1974, Investigations (2-hour format) from 6 November 1974. In 1975 he began hosting The Science Show, a one-hour science-based radio interview show. At one time it was the most popular radio show on Radio 2 (Radio National's former name), and it is one of the longest-running radio shows in Australia and the world.

Ockham's Razor followed in 1984, with Williams introducing a leading scientist or personality who then expounds from a prepared text on a topic of their choice, with a view to making a subject simple and accessible to the public, hence the title relating to the famous statement on parsimony by William of Ockham. In Conversation commenced in 1997, with Williams interviewing the personality.

== Other media work ==
- Narrating Nature of Australia, a series for ABC TV
- Appearing in World Safari with David Attenborough
- Instigating the establishment of the Eureka Awards for Excellence in Science Communication and Innovation by the ABC and Australian Museum

== Trade union activism ==
In 1977, Williams gave an impassioned speech to the ABC Staff Association against ABC management's quiescence in the face of budget cuts and political interference. He said that a UK proposal that the government appoint one third of BBC board members had been publicly opposed by BBC management but that the ABC chairman acted as if he headed an organisation rivalling the BBC. Following his speech the meeting voted unanimously that it had no confidence in the ABC chair, John Norgard.

== Other roles ==
- Adjunct professor at the University of Queensland
- Visiting professor at the University of New South Wales
- Deputy Chair, Australian Science Media Centre, since 2012
- President, Australian Science Communicators, 1998–2001
- President, Australia and New Zealand Advancement of Science, 1992
- Chair, Australian Commission for the Future, 1990–1994
- President of the Australian Museum Trust, 1986–1994
- Chairman of the Commission For The Future
- President of Australian Science Communicators
- President of the Australian & New Zealand Association for the Advancement of Science (ANZAAS) Congress in Brisbane
- Co-Chairman of the Biology Department at the University of Texas, El Paso
- Member of the council of Voiceless, the animal protection institute, 2009–?

== Honours, awards and recognition ==
=== Australian honours ===
- 1988: Honorary Member of the Order of Australia (AM), 26 January, "For service to science, particularly in the fields of media and education"
- 2001: Centenary Medal, 1 January, "For outstanding service in science communication"
- 2020: Honorary Officer of the Order of Australia (AO), 26 January, "For distinguished service to science as a journalist, radio presenter and author, and to education"
- 2025: Australian Skeptics awarded Williams The Thornett Award for the Promotion of Reason.

=== Academic honours ===
As of May 2022 Williams has honorary doctorates from seven universities:

- Australian National University (law)
- Deakin University (science, 1988)
- University of New South Wales
- University of Queensland
- University of South Australia
- University of Sydney (science, 1988)
- Macquarie University (science, 1988)

He was a Reuters Fellow at the University of Oxford in 1994 (where he wrote his autobiography), and a visiting fellow at Balliol College in 1995–6.

=== Other recognition ===
- Fellow of the Australian Academy of Science, the first journalist so honoured, in 1993
- Proclaimed a Living National Treasures (1987)
- Australian Rostrum Speaker of the Year (1993)
- Australian Humanist of the Year (1993); awarded by the Council of Australian Humanist Societies
- Radio Prize from the Human Rights Commission
- United Nations Association of Australia Media Peace Prize
- Michael Daley Award for Science Journalism
- Centre for Australian Cultural Studies National Award 1996 (Individual)

== Publications ==
As well as many articles and introductions to books, Williams has written at least 10 books, including:

- The Uncertainty Principle (1991, nonfiction)
- And Now For Something Completely Different (1995), autobiography, written when he was a Reuters Fellow at Oxford. The title refers to a popular radio interview he did with John Cleese on the topic of psychiatry.
- This Is the Science Show (1995, nonfiction)
- Normal Service Won't Be Resumed: The Future of Public Broadcasting (1996, nonfiction)
- Future Perfect (2007, nonfiction), about "the future of just about everything"
- 2007 (published 2001) is a dystopian novel describing a rebellion of animals.
- Turmoil: Letters from the Brink (2018, nonfiction)

== Personal life ==
Williams met Pamela Traylor when in Australia for the first time, and they married on 10 June 1966 before both moving back to the UK, where he studied science. They had two children.

He is a good friend of fellow ABC presenter, Norman Swan, a qualified medical doctor, who intervened to help save his life when he suffered a cardiac arrest in 1988.

As of 2022 Williams is in a long-term relationship with Jonica Newby, a former presenter on ABC Television's Catalyst science journalism program. Williams underwent chemotherapy for colorectal cancer in 2014 and 2015; at one point he was hospitalised for five weeks but continued to make The Science Show from his hospital bed.
