= Secular Humanist League of Brazil =

Brazilian nonprofit organization

LiHS's logo

The Secular Humanist League of Brazil, or LiHS, is a nonprofit organization dedicated to skepticism, separation of church and state, scientific literacy and human rights, tenets of secular humanism.

It was founded in Porto Alegre, Rio Grande do Sul, Brazil, on February 1, 2010. Its foundation was preceded by the activities of its blog, Bule Voador, arguably the largest secularist website in Brazil. The name "Bule Voador" stands for "Flying Teapot" in Portuguese and alludes to Bertrand Russell's teapot.

== Campaigns ==
LiHS took part in the 100 cities against stoning protest on August 28, 2010, a campaign for saving Sakineh Mohammadi Ashtiani and others from execution in Iran. The Secular Humanist League of Brazil had also broad local media coverage from the 10:23 campaign against homeopathy, and also supports local meetings of Skeptics in the Pub and LGBT rights campaigns.

The Brazilian Supreme Federal Court lists LiHS as one of the speakers against religious teaching in public schools in an upcoming trial.

== Members ==
The organization has reported to have 2,530 members in November 2012.

Among the honorary members are human rights activist Maryam Namazie, anthropological linguist Daniel Everett, philosopher Daniel Dennett, human rights academic Debora Diniz, Brazilian congressman and gay rights activist Jean Wyllys, among other Brazilian humanists.

== I Secular Humanist Congress of Brazil ==
LiHS has organised the first Secular Humanist Congress in South America, taking place in the city of Porto Alegre, RS, Brazil, with the support of the International Humanist and Ethical Union and Atheist Alliance International.

The event featured prominent humanists such as Portuguese philosopher Desidério Murcho, Brazilian skeptic Kentaro Mori, Brazilian astrophysicist Horacio Dottori, among others. Atheist Alliance International declared the event was a success.
