= Ian Robinson (rationalist) =

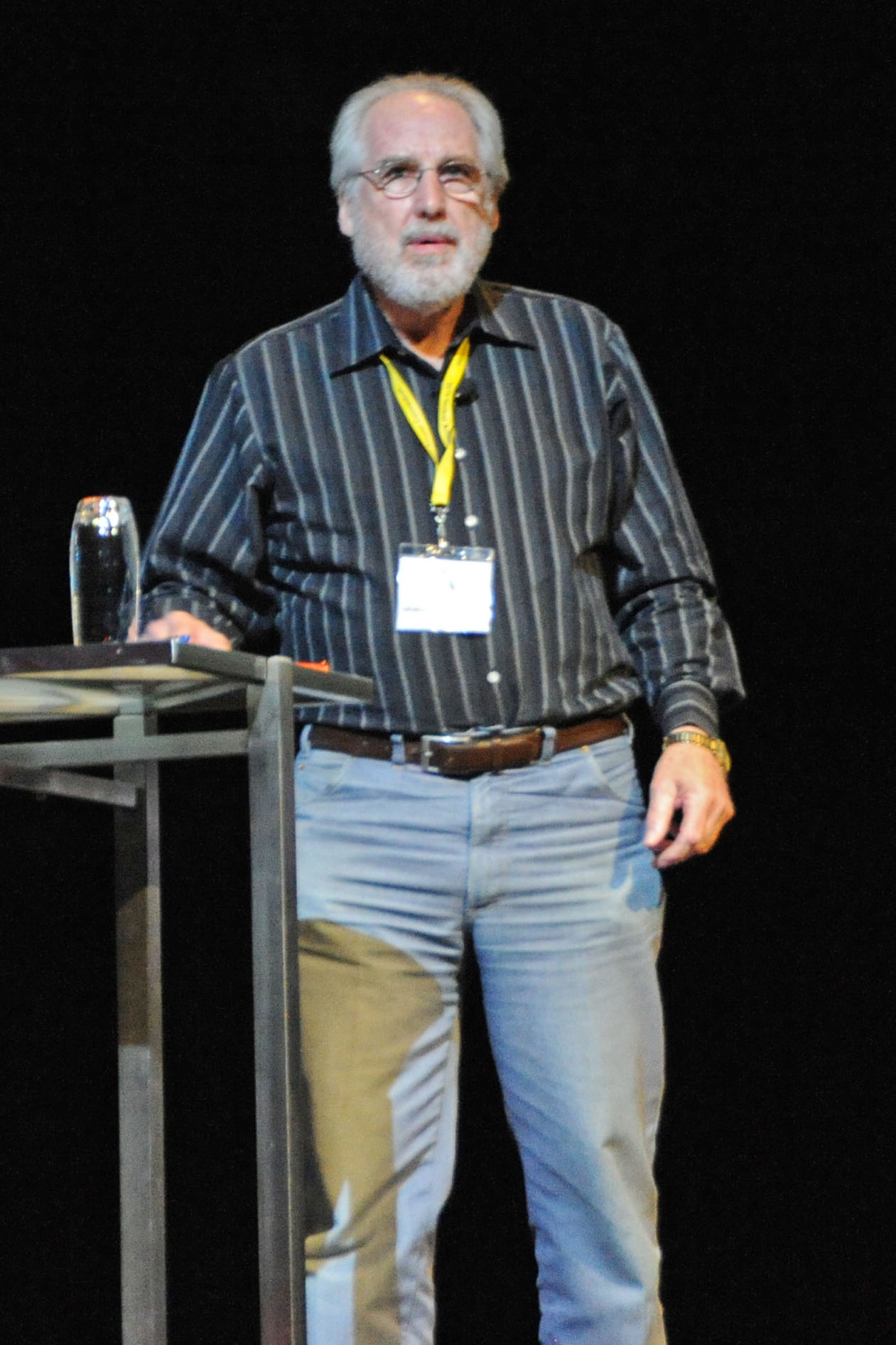
Ian Robinson speaking at the 2010 Global Atheist Convention

Ian Robinson (born 18 November 1940 in Melbourne, Australia) is president emeritus of the Rationalist Society of Australia and immediate past chairman of the Rationalist Association of Australia.

== Biography ==
He was educated at Ivanhoe Grammar School and the University of Melbourne, where he graduated with honours in philosophy. Subsequently, he has been a tutor in philosophy at the University of Melbourne, a lecturer in philosophy of education at Coburg Teachers' College, leader of the Curriculum Project Team (Primary) for the Victoria Ministry of Education and manager of the Music and Writing Department at Chisholm Institute, from which he retired in 2010.

He has been editor of Farrago, MUM, National U, Chalkface and the Australian Rationalist, and written many articles and books. His fantasy story "The Crypt of Fleeting Hope" was published by Penguin.

He has acted in and directed a number of plays at La Mama and the Pram Factory theatres in Melbourne, served as president of the Melbourne Writers' Theatre and was theatre critic for the National Times. He is married to actress Maggie Millar.

== Bibliography ==
"Marijuana and Society", the Australian Rationalist, Vol. 1, No. 5, 1970.

"Ivan Illich and Education", Part 1, the Australian Rationalist, Vol. 3, No. 2, December, 1973.

"Ivan Illich and Education", Part 2, the Australian Rationalist, Vol. 4, No. 1, February, 1974.

Weekly theatre reviews. The National Times. July, 1974-July, 1977.

"Everything I'm afraid you've been teaching children and haven't wanted to know about", Curriculum and Research Bulletin, Vol. X, No. 3, August. 1975.

The Primary School Curriculum: A Manual for Victorian Schools, Education Department of Victoria, 1979, (principal author).

"Challenging sex-role stereotypes", Chalkface, Vol. 3, No. 1, April, 1983.

Key Group: Empowering Teachers to Change, Melbourne, BLIPS, 1987, (with Nick Alexopoulos).

Exploring Mathematics in Classrooms, Melbourne, Ministry of Education, 1987. (with Nick Alexopoulos)

"Language and Mathematics: The Experience of EMIC and Key Group", in Robert Hunting (ed), Language Issues in Learning and Teaching Mathematics, Papers from a Conference on the theme "What can recent work on language learning contribute to the teaching of mathematics?" La Trobe University, 1988.

"The Empowerment Paradigm for the Professional Development of Teachers of Mathematics", in Ken Clements and Nerida Ellerton (eds), School Mathematics: The Challenge to Change, Deakin University, 1989.

Young Australia Mathematics, Levels 3–6, Melbourne, Thomas Nelson Australia, 1990-2 (Co-author).

Families Count - a program for parents, Boronia School Support Centre, 1st edition, 1990; 2nd edition, 1991; (with Hilary Hollingsworth).

"The Loch Ness Monster Bites the Dust," The Australian Rationalist, No 26, March, 1991.

"Problem Solving: A Taxonomy and an Evaluation", in Jill O'Reilly and Sue Wettenhall (eds), Mathematics: Inclusive Dynamic Exciting Active Stimulating, Mathematics Association of Victoria, 1991.

Learning Mathematics: A Resource Kit for Teachers, Collins Dove, 1992, (with Hilary Hollingsworth).

"Fitting a Round Child into a Square Profile", in Marj Horne and Majorie Supple (eds), Mathematics: Meeting the Challenge, Mathematics Association of Victoria, 1992.

"Campion's champion says that myth is The Piano's forte", The Age, Friday 25 March 1994, p. 13.

"The Crypt of Fleeting Hope" in Paul Collins (ed), Dream Weavers. Penguin, 1996. [Short listed for 1996 Aurealis Science Fiction and Fantasy Awards]

"The Myth of the Mandate". Australian Rationalist, Number 48, Autumn, 1999.

"Can an Atheist have a Religious Experience?". Australian Rationalist, Number 54, Winter, 2000.

"Islam: a rationalist response". Australian Rationalist, Number 62, Autumn, 2003.

"Bruce Doull: No Frills, No Fuss" in Stephanie Holt & Garrie Hutchinson (eds): Footy's Greatest Players, Coulomb Publications, 2003.

"How I was Mistaken for a Korean Athlete because of my Bad French" in Garrie Hutchinson (ed): Best Sports Writing of 2004, Black Inc, 2004.

"Da Vinci, dark materials and dogs in the night". Australian Rationalist, Number 69, Summer, 2005.

"The lessons of terror". Australian Rationalist, Number 70, Autumn-Winter, 2005.

"Exposing the 'intelligent design' can trick". Australian Rationalist, Number 71, Spring, 2005.

"Atheism as a Spiritual Path". pp 363–371 in The Australian Book of Atheism (ed. Bonett, Warren), 2010.
