= North Texas Church of Freethought =

Atheist church

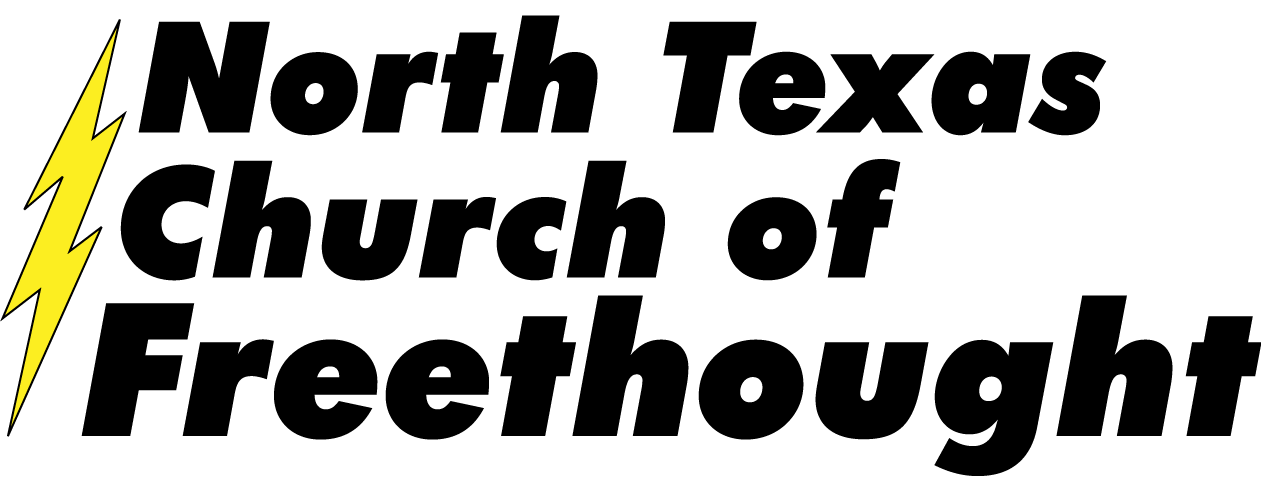
- Type: church
- Founded: 1994, Dallas, Texas, U.S.
- Headquarters: Dallas, Texas
- Key people: Tim Gorski, MD, Pastoral Director
- Website: www.churchoffreethought.org

The North Texas Church of Freethought (NTCOF) was founded by Tim Gorski and Mike and Marilyn Sullivan in 1994 as perhaps the first explicitly non-theistic and non-supernaturalistic religious organization in the USA. Its aim has been to serve the psychosocial needs of atheists, agnostics, and other non-religious people in the Dallas-Fort Worth area and to promote a rational and humanistic view of what have been traditionally "religious" issues and questions. The first service was held at what was then the Wilson World hotel in Irving, Texas; later services were held at various hotels in the Irving/Las Colinas area. Free childcare and Sunday School classes were an integral part of the NTCOF's mission.

== Overview ==
Since March 2000 the Houston Church of Freethought has pursued the same goals and provided the same services in that city. A Northern California Church of Freethought was briefly in existence around 1999, but has since disbanded.

On May 18, 2006, the Texas State Comptroller's office granted tax-exempt status to the NTCOF as a result of actions taken by Americans United for Separation of Church and State, which had previously secured tax-exempt status for the Ethical Society of Austin. This status had been previously denied to the NTCOF and other non-traditional churches because they did not profess "a belief in God, or gods, or a higher power."

Because the NTCOF characterizes itself as a church, it has been the subject of mixed opinion by atheist groups; for example, an attempted donation to American Atheists was once rejected, and Paul Kurtz, founder of the Council for Secular Humanism, discouraged the NTCOF founders when they approached him with their idea. However, the Atheist Alliance International in 2000 published a press release defending the NTCOF against perceived media bias from a Dallas-area television news story. The NTCOF takes the position that churches are simply units of social organization, intermediate between those of the family and the larger community, that are based on deeply felt shared beliefs concerning "matters of ultimate concern." NTCOF Officiants have conducted marriages, naming ceremonies, and funerals/remembrances.

The NTCOF filed an amicus curiae brief in 2004 for Elk Grove Unified School District v. Newdow, supporting Michael Newdow's argument. Newdow has also founded a secular church, the First Atheist Church of True Science (FACTS).
