= The Atheist Agenda =

University of Texas at San Antonio atheist organization

The Atheist Agenda is an organization founded in 2005 by group of atheists from the University of Texas at San Antonio. The group is dedicated to the philosophy of freethought, as well as promoting aggressive activism against theology and theological institutions, encouraging non-believers to take pride in their history and community, and providing to them with fellowship intended to be similar to shared by those of a religious background. The Agenda holds meetings open to anyone interested and stages demonstrations (most notably the "Smut for Smut" campaign) in the San Antonio and Austin areas, to make their viewpoints known. A documentary was produced regarding Atheist Agenda and their Smut for Smut campaign in 2011, titled Dissonance. Since its creation, the Atheist Agenda has grown from small gathering of students to a group of hundreds, with members at The University of Texas at Austin and University of Houston in addition to those at UTSA. The atheist agenda at UTSA later disbanded.
