= Fusion Party (Australia) =

Australian political party

Fusion Party FUSION | Planet Rescue | Whistleblower Protection | Innovation
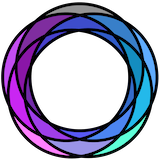
- Abbreviation: FUSION; FP; FUS
- President: Drew Wolfendale
- Spokesperson: Owen Miller
- Founded: 2021; 5 years ago
- Merger of: Science Party; Pirate Party; Secular Party; Vote Planet; Climate Change Justice Party
- Headquarters: Mansfield, Victoria, Australia
- Ideology: Secular humanism; Environmentalism; Progressivism
- Colours: Bluebell; Aquamarine; Vivid mulberry

Website
- Official website

FUSION | Planet Rescue | Whistleblower Protection | Innovation previously known as Fusion: Science, Pirate, Secular, Climate Emergency, commonly known as Fusion Party Australia or simply Fusion (sometimes stylised in all caps), is an Australian political party. It was created by the merging of the Science Party, Pirate Party, Secular Party, Vote Planet, and Climate Change Justice Party. In 2025, it formed an alliance with the Australian Progressives and Democracy First.

== Formation ==
The party was formed in 2021 following the passing of the Electoral Legislation Amendment (Party Registration Integrity) Bill 2021 to amend the Commonwealth Electoral Act 1918. The effects of the legislation included increasing the minimum membership requirement for non-parliamentary parties from 500 to 1,500 unique members and new party naming rules, in order to "[ensure] there exists a genuine base of community support for political parties and reduce the risk of voter confusion".

Climate Emergency Action Alliance: Vote Planet remained registered for federal elections and undertook a name change to FUSION: Science, Pirate, Secular, Climate Emergency in March 2022. In the course of the amalgamation, the Science Party and Secular Party were deregistered in January 2022 by the Australian Electoral Commission (AEC). The Pirate Party was deregistered in April 2021. Fusion underwent a name change to FUSION | Planet Rescue | Whistleblower Protection | Innovation in January 2025.

Fusion has a federated structure, with the merging former parties retaining a degree of autonomy as formal branches.

== Ideology and policies ==
The Fusion Party describes itself as, "A party determined to secure a safe climate and environment, a humanist society, and free culture, held together by science". The party supports the separation of church and state, referring to its policy as secular humanism. It supports removing religious prayers, rituals, and bias from government and public institutions and their documentation, and abolishing blasphemy laws.

The party supports a transparent government, such as disclosure of political donations above $1,000, open access to advice behind policy decisions and removal of restrictions of speech on public servants. It also defines itself as anti-corruption and wants to create an anti-corruption commission and implement protections for whistleblowers and activists. The party wants to enshrine network neutrality and freedom of expression in law, supports freedom of speech, the creation of a constitutional bill of rights and removing bans on voluntary euthanasia to decriminalise physician-assisted dying.

Fusion supports lowering the voting age to 16-years-old, but retaining the current obligation age to vote at 18-years-old, as well as introducing electoral education into the high school curriculum.

The party supports the legalisation of cannabis in Australia, with similar laws and regulations to how alcohol is controlled in the country.

The Fusion Party supports animal welfare in terms of incentivising meat alternatives and alternative protein sources, such as lab grown meat. It supports ending feed lots and factory farming, ending live export of animals for food, and establishing an Independent Office of Animal Welfare.

The party has stated its support for "the reintroduction of stronger media ownership laws that cap ownership share by any one corporation".

The party supports a universal basic income (UBI) in the form of a direct payment of at least $500 per week (in 2024 dollars) to every Australian citizen aged over 18-years-old.

In terms of foreign policy, Fusion advocates for "responsible global citizenship", which involves supporting human rights worldwide, providing aid to other countries and helping asylum seekers.

== Member parties ==
Party	Leader	Ideology
Science Party	Andrea Leong	Techno-progressivism
Pirate Party	Miles Whiticker	Pirate politics
Secular Party	John Perkins	Secular humanism
Climate Emergency Action Alliance: Vote Planet	Kammy Cordner-Hunt	Environmentalism
Climate Change Justice Party	Petar Johnson	Climate justice

== Electoral results ==
The Fusion Party fielded Senate candidates in the 2022 federal election in every mainland state, polling a national total of 51,676 votes (0.34%). The party also ran candidates in nine lower-house seats, with their best lower-house result being 2.16% of primary votes in the Division of Dobell.

In 2023, Fusion contested the Aston by-election. Their candidate, Owen Miller, received 2,637 votes, which was 2.89% of the vote.

=== House of Representatives ===
Election	Votes	%	Seats won	Total seats	Status
2022	13,319	0.09 (#18)	0	0 / 150	Extra-parliamentary
2025	14,374	0.09 (#18)	0	0 / 150	Extra-parliamentary

=== Senate ===
Election	Votes	%	Seats won	Total seats	±	Status
2022	51,676	0.34 (#17)	0 / 40	0 / 76	0	Extra-parliamentary
2025	46,007	0.29 (#21)	0 / 40	0 / 76	0	Extra-parliamentary

== 2025 federal election candidates ==
Fusion ran a number of candidates for the 2025 Australian federal election:

=== New South Wales ===
- John August for Bennelong
- Brendan Clarke for Berowra
- Miles Whiticker for Senate
- Andrew Potts for Senate

=== Queensland ===
- Chris Simpson for Senate

=== South Australia ===
- Adrien Aloe for Hindmarsh
- Amelie Hannah for Makin
- Matthew McMillan for Adelaide
- Imelda Agars for Senate

=== Tasmania ===
- Kerry Graham for Senate

=== Victoria ===
- Helen Huang for Melbourne
- Owen Miller for Wills

=== Western Australia ===
- Tian Carrie-Wilson for Senate
- Tamara Alderdice for Senate

None of these candidates were elected.

== See also ==
- Environmental issues in Australia
- Environmental movement in Australia
- Euthanasia in Australia
- Free-culture movement
- Humanism
- Irreligion in Australia
- List of political parties in Australia
- Secularism
- Separation of church and state in Australia
