= Christian Research Association =

Group studying Christianity in Australia

The Christian Research Association (CRA) was founded in 1985 to study the Christian faith in Australia. Its work consists of major research projects which have focussed on overviews of research on spirituality and religion in relation to Australian culture, contract research for Christian organisations, including local reports based on Australian Census data, and support for other organisations in research that enhances the mission of the churches and the wellbeing of individuals and society in Australia.

== Origin and supporters ==
The Christian Research Association was founded in 1985 to study the Christian faith in Australia.

Its key supporters and board members are:

- The Anglican Diocese of Melbourne
- Australian Catholic Bishops’ Conference
- Christian Heritage College
- Lutheran Church of Australia
- Seventh-day Adventist Church
- Sheridan College (Perth)
- Tabor College (Adelaide)
- The Salvation Army
- Uniting Church, Synod of Victoria and Tasmania

== Aim ==
According to the Christian Research Association's website, its aim is "to provide and promote high quality research that enhances the mission of the Churches and the wellbeing of individuals and society in Australia".

The Christian Research Association has several aspects to its work:

1. Major research projects, for example, on the spirituality of young people, rural church life, and the multiplicity of faith communities in Australia.
2. Overview of research on religion and church-life in Australia, primarily through Pointers, a quarterly bulletin of reports of research.
3. Contract research for individual churches, denominational bodies, and other church-related organisations, such as schools and welfare organisations, including reports using Census data, analyses of surveys and qualitative studies.
4. Publication of the peer-review Journal of Contemporary Ministry.
5. Provision of human research ethics services for various organisations and individuals.

== Recent activities ==
Some of the early work of the Christian Research Association focussed on understanding the different patterns of faith in Australian Churches. It moved on a study of the attitudes of Australians who did not attend church. In seeking to understand the changes in attitudes to the Christian faith and the churches, it has focussed on the cultural changes which occurred in Australia in the 1960s and 1970s.

In 1995, the Christian Research Association began working with the Department of Immigration and Multicultural Affairs and a range of academics to produce a series of books on the various religious communities in Australia. Twelve books were produced covering the Anglican, Baptist, Buddhist, Catholic, Eastern Orthodox, Hindu and Sikh, Jewish, Lutheran, Muslim, Pentecostal, Presbyterian and Uniting Church communities. In 2000, this set of materials was expanded to include book length materials on another 15 religious communities and brief articles covering approximately 140 other religious groups present in Australia, and published on CD-Rom. A third edition of this 'encyclopedia' of religion in Australia was published in 2010.

Other work has centred on Australian values and the place that spirituality has in relation to other values. The Christian Research Association has argued that there are four major orientations in values on which Australians vary: the relative importance of order, of self-enhancement, of social enhancement, and spirituality.

Since 2002, the Christian Research Association has been involved in studies of the religious faith and spirituality of young people. It was a partner, with Monash University and the Australian Catholic University, in a major study, 'The Spirit of Generation Y'. This study involved a national telephone survey of 1200 young people as well as in-depth face-to-face interviews. It was supplemented by the Schools Project Study which involved interviews with 240 students and surveys of more than 5000 students. A new round of surveys of students in schools was commenced in 2011.

This led to both surveys and interviews on how religious education classes and activities in schools was being received by students. The material was brought together in 2017 in Educating for Purposeful Living in a Post-Traditional Age. This book analyses the current situation in which most young people are being raised in which religious traditions mean little to them. The books suggests how religious education might be re-worked with a focus on purposeful living. It suggests new approaches to curricula, to reflections days and festivals, to social justice programs and immersion experiences and ways of making connections with adult communities.

Between 2014 and 2016, extensive work was done on youth groups and youth leadership. Visits were made to youth groups associated with churches in several states and in several denominations. A roundtable of youth leaders was held in 2016 and a book released A Vision for Effective Youth Ministry: Insights from Australian Research.

Another major project has been an examination of rural churches in Australia. Studies have been conducted of Uniting Churches, Anglican Churches and Catholic Churches. The Christian Research Association has published a small summary book of their findings.

The Christian Research Association has been involved in international networks of researchers, including the Lausanne Researchers International Network. The Christian Research Association was responsible for organizing an international conference of mission and church-related researchers in Australia in 2008.

In April 2010, the Christian Research Association produced the report Bible Engagement Among Australian Young People, which was commissioned by the Bible Society of South Australia. The report states: "Conservatively interpreted, the surveys show that around 4 per cent of young people read the Bible daily, another 6 per cent read it weekly, and 15 to 20 per cent read it very occasionally."

In September 2010, the Christian Research Association invited the leaders of all Christian denominations to gather for a consideration of the overview of the role of church and faith in the Australian context. The conference, entitled 'Shaping Australia's Spirituality', noted how many aspects of church practice are expanding, such as many fields of chaplaincy, the provision of schools and the welfare agencies of the churches. Other areas of church life are in decline, including involvement in many local churches and the role that the churches play in public life. The conference noted the role that the Christian faith continues to play in the formation of personal values among Australians, but that the churches were not highly engaged in the national and global issues of climate and economic change and sustainability. As the understanding of the world and the forms of community and culture change, the conference examined how the Christian faith needs to be re-expressed and new forms of Christian community need to be developed, in order to relate to the contemporary Australian context.

In 2016, the Christian Research Association conducted a large national survey on religion and volunteering in conjunction with SEIROS (Study of the Economic Impact of Religion on Society). This has led to a number of peer-reviewed articles and books. It was found that churches encouraged volunteering particularly through bringing people together who invited each other to become engaged in voluntary activities. It found that, after taking account of voluntary activities undertaken for the sake of the religious community, religious attenders were more highly involved in volunteering for the sake of the wider community than non-attenders. This work has been summarised in a CRA report published in 2022, The Impact of Religion in Australian Society through Individual Lives, Research Paper No.18.

In 2022, the Christian Research Association has been involved in the analysis of the 2021 Census data. It has noted the increasing number of responses which reject institutional identity, including the increase in ‘no religion’ responses, but also the numbers of people writing in ‘Christian’ rather than identification, or writing in ‘my own beliefs’. A book summarising the analysis, Australia’s Religious and Non-Religious Profiles: Analysis of the 2021 Census, was released in December 2022. This work builds on the extensive work that the Association has one in documenting and analysing the numbers in the Australian population who describe themselves as ‘spiritual but not religious’.

The Christian Research Association continues to do its own research, but also supports the research of others. Its ethics services now cater for a number of colleges including Christian Heritage College, Eastern College, Sheridan College, Tabor College (Adelaide) and the University of Divinity. It also gathers a range of people together as Research Fellows and provides assistance for their research.

== See also ==
- Christianity in Australia
- Religion in Australia
