= Separation of church and state in Australia =

The Constitution of Australia prevents the Commonwealth from establishing any religion or requiring a religious test for any office:—

Ch 5 § 116 The Commonwealth shall not make any law for establishing any religion, or for imposing any religious observance, or for prohibiting the free exercise of any religion, and no religious test shall be required as a qualification for any office or public trust under the Commonwealth.

The language is derived from the United States' constitution, but has been altered. Following the usual practice of the High Court, it has been interpreted far more narrowly than the equivalent US sections and no law has ever been struck down for contravening the section. Today, the Commonwealth Government provides broad-based funding to religious schools and also funds school chaplains for public and private schools. All Australian parliaments are opened with a Christian prayer, and the preamble to the Australian Constitution refers to a "humbl[e] rel[iance] on the blessing of Almighty God."

Although the Australian monarch is King Charles III, also British monarch and Governor of the Church of England, his Australian title is unrelated to his religious office and he has no role in the Anglican Church of Australia. The prohibition against religious tests has allowed former Anglican Archbishop of Brisbane Peter Hollingworth to be appointed Governor-General of Australia, the highest domestic constitutional officer; however, this was criticised.

== States ==
Despite inclusion in the "States" chapter, Section 116 does not apply to states because of changes during drafting, and they are free to establish their own religions. Although no state has ever introduced a state church (NSW restricted religious groups during the early colonial period), the legal body corresponding to many religious organisations is established by state legislation. There have been two referendums to extend Section 116 to states, but both failed. In each case the changes were grouped with other changes and voters did not have the opportunity to expressly accept only one change. Most states permit broad exemptions to religious groups from anti-discrimination legislation; for example, the NSW act allowing same-sex couples to adopt permits religious adoption agencies to refuse them.

The current situation, described as a "principle of state neutrality" rather than "separation of church and state", has been criticised by both secularists and religious groups. On the one hand, secularists have argued that government neutrality to religions leads to a "flawed democrac[y]" or even a "pluralistic theocracy" as the government cannot be neutral towards the religion of people who do not have one. On the other hand, religious groups and others have been concerned that state governments are restricting them from exercising their religion by preventing them from criticising other groups and preventing them from refusing to do acts that they deem unconscionable according to their faith.

== See also ==
- Section 116 of the Constitution of Australia
- Separation of church and state § Australia
- Anglican Church of Australia
- Catholic Church in Australia
- Christian politics in Australia
- Fusion Party (Australia)
- Irreligion in Australia
- National Secular Lobby
- Republicanism in Australia
