= Practice What You Preach Foundation =

US non-profit organization

Practice What You Preach Foundation was a non-profit organization in the United States that worked to bridge religious communities and secular organizations, particularly in the Greater Los Angeles Area. It was operational from 2011 to 2017 in California. It sponsored trips to religious and non-religious institutions and partnered with downtown Los Angeles charitable and humanitarian organizations. It was founded by Donald Westbrook, PhD, researcher in religious studies who graduated from Claremont Graduate University and has a history of involvement in inter-faith dialogue.
