= National Secular Lobby =

- Formation: 2017
- Region served: Australia
- Website: www.nsl.org.au

The National Secular Lobby is an Australian pro-secular organisation, founded in July 2017 and officially launched in January 2018. It aims to promote secular principles and the separation of church and state in Australia.

The National Secular Lobby combines the building of grassroots awareness and action with the direct lobbying of parliamentarians by high profile ambassadors. It has made submissions to various parliamentary inquiries, including the Religious Freedom Review (2018), the 2021 Census Topic Review (2018), and the Parliamentary Prayers Inquiry (2018).

In 2020, the National Secular Lobby was one of 11 free-thought and pro-secular groups that took part in the #DontDivideUs campaign against the Morrison government's "Religious Freedom Bill". The campaign stated that the proposed Bill "will make it easier for people to impose their beliefs on others" and "will allow people to discriminate against their fellow Australians". The Bill was eventually defeated in parliament.

In 2021, the National Secular Lobby was one of the groups (along with the Rationalist Society of Australia, Humanists Australia, the Atheist Foundation of Australia, Humanists Victoria, and Sydney Atheists) who ran a national campaign, Census – Not Religious? Mark 'No Religion', encouraging people to reflect upon their current and true relationship with religion when answering the 2021 Census question on religion.

In 2023, the National Secular Lobby was one of the groups (along with the NSW Teachers Federation, Rationalist Society of Australia and Humanists Victoria) who co-organised and co-sponsored the inaugural Secularism Australia Conference, which took place in Sydney in December.

In 2026, the National Secular Lobby was again one of the groups (this time in conjunction with the Rationalist Society of Australia, Humanists Australia, Humanists Victoria, the Secular Association of NSW, Recovering From Religion Australia, and the Victorian branch of Skeptics Australia) driving the national Census – Not Religious? Mark 'No Religion' campaign, encouraging people "to help bring greater integrity to Australia's Census data by reflecting [their] authentic self when answering the religion question". Based on documents obtained by the Rationalist Society of Australia under freedom of information laws, the campaign accused religious groups — in particular the Australian Catholic Bishops Conference — of interfering with the 2026 census public consultation and review process, resulting in the 2026 Australian census re-using the religion question from the 2021 census, which the campaign described as "leading" and "bias-prone".

== Ambassadors ==
Current National Secular Lobby ambassadors are:

- Phillip Adams
- Van Badham
- Lazaras Panayiotou
- Julian Burnside
- Jane Caro
- Fiona Patten
- Chris Schacht
- Dr Paul Willis

== See also ==
- Secular Party of Australia
- Secular state
- Secularism
- Secularity
