= Secular Party of Australia =

- President: John Perkins
- Secretary: Shaun Haddrill
- Spokesperson: Trevor Bell
- Founded: 2006; 20 years ago
- Dissolved: 2022; 4 years ago
- Ideology: Secular humanism Australian republicanism
- National affiliation: Fusion Party (since 2022)

Website
- www.secular.org.au

The Secular Party of Australia is a minor Australian political party, founded in January 2006 and registered as a federal political party in 2010. It aims to promote secular humanist ethical principles and the separation of church and state in Australia.

In early 2022 it merged with other parties to become the Fusion Party, however continues to exist as its own entity.

== History ==
The Secular Party was founded in January 2006 after discussions in late 2005, and registered as a federal political party in 2010.

In 2005, the Secular Party took out a series of advertisements airing in prime time, spoken by party founder and then vice-president John Goldbaum. The campaign often used the slogan "Don't Let the Church Govern Australia", attacking the policies of the Howard government concerning abortion, contraception, and same-sex marriage.

In 2007 the party merged with the similar Freedom From Religion Party. The phrase "Freedom From Religion" was appended as a subheading to the main party name on the website and in marketing materials. This subheading has since been changed to "Challenging Religious Privilege".

The party contested the 2007 Federal Australian election by fielding candidates for each Australian state's representation in the Senate under the campaign slogan "Don't Let The Church Govern Australia - Keep Religion Out of Politics". The party was not registered federally, so the party name did not appear on the ballot paper. Ian Bryce appeared on ABC Radio in a discussion on secularism and John Perkins submitted an article to the Australian political e-journal On Line Opinion, but the party received little other media attention during the campaign.

In 2008 and 2009 the party became more active in Senate Committee discussions around the taxation of religious organisations and the HREOC submission on same-sex discrimination.

On 2 July 2009, the Secular Party applied to the Australian Electoral Commission to be registered as a federal political party; its application was accepted on 16 June 2010.

The 2010 federal election was the Secular Party's first election as a registered political party. The party fielded 31 candidates across Australia. These included Senate candidates in all states and 19 candidates for the House of Representatives. According to the Australian Electoral Commission the total number of votes cast for the party in lower house seats was 10,287 (0.1%) of the overall total. The party received 8,741 first preference votes (0.09%) in the Senate election.

In the 2013 federal election, the Secular Party received 4,834 votes (0.04%) in the lower house, and 12,698 first preference votes (0.09%) in the senate.

In the 2016 federal election, the Secular Party of Australia fielded 8 candidates for the senate, with 2 each for the Australian Capital Territory, New South Wales, Queensland and Victoria.

In the 2019 federal election, the Secular Party of Australia fielded 2 candidates for the senate for Victoria.

The party has joined the Fusion Party alliance with the Pirate Party, Science Party and Vote Planet.

On 11 January 2022, the party was voluntarily de-registered within the Australian Electoral Commission due to being unable to meet the increased registration requirement of 1,500 members.

== Policies and aims ==
=== Aims ===
- To bring about separation of church and state in Australia
- To promote secularism worldwide
- To stand for human rights and social justice, affirming the dignity of each human being
- To support the maximisation of individual liberty and opportunity consistent with social and environment responsibility
- To defend freedom of expression everywhere
- To espouse policies which support a rational approach to human problems
- To promote the fullest use of science for human welfare
- To gain and maintain for non-religious people the same rights that are enjoyed by members of religious bodies

The Secular Party believes that the law and policy in Australia isn't that of a truly secular government and that voters in Australia are looking for a secular alternative.

=== The party supports ===
- Constitutional separation of Church and State
- A secular republic, free of hereditary privilege
- Pro-choice regarding abortion
- Lesbian IVF availability
- Same-sex marriage in Australia
- Contraception and sex education
- Anti-homophobia education
- Removal of anti-discrimination exemptions for religious schools and businesses
- Voluntary euthanasia
- Embryonic stem cell research
- Scientific research not to be limited by religious objections

=== The party opposes ===
- Censorship, religious coercion and theocracy
- Government support for religious schools
- Religious attire at schools
- Religious indoctrination of children
- Sharia law

== See also ==
- List of political parties in Australia
- National Secular Lobby
- Secular state
- Secularity
