= Happy Human =

Symbol of secular humanism

"Happy Human" symbol

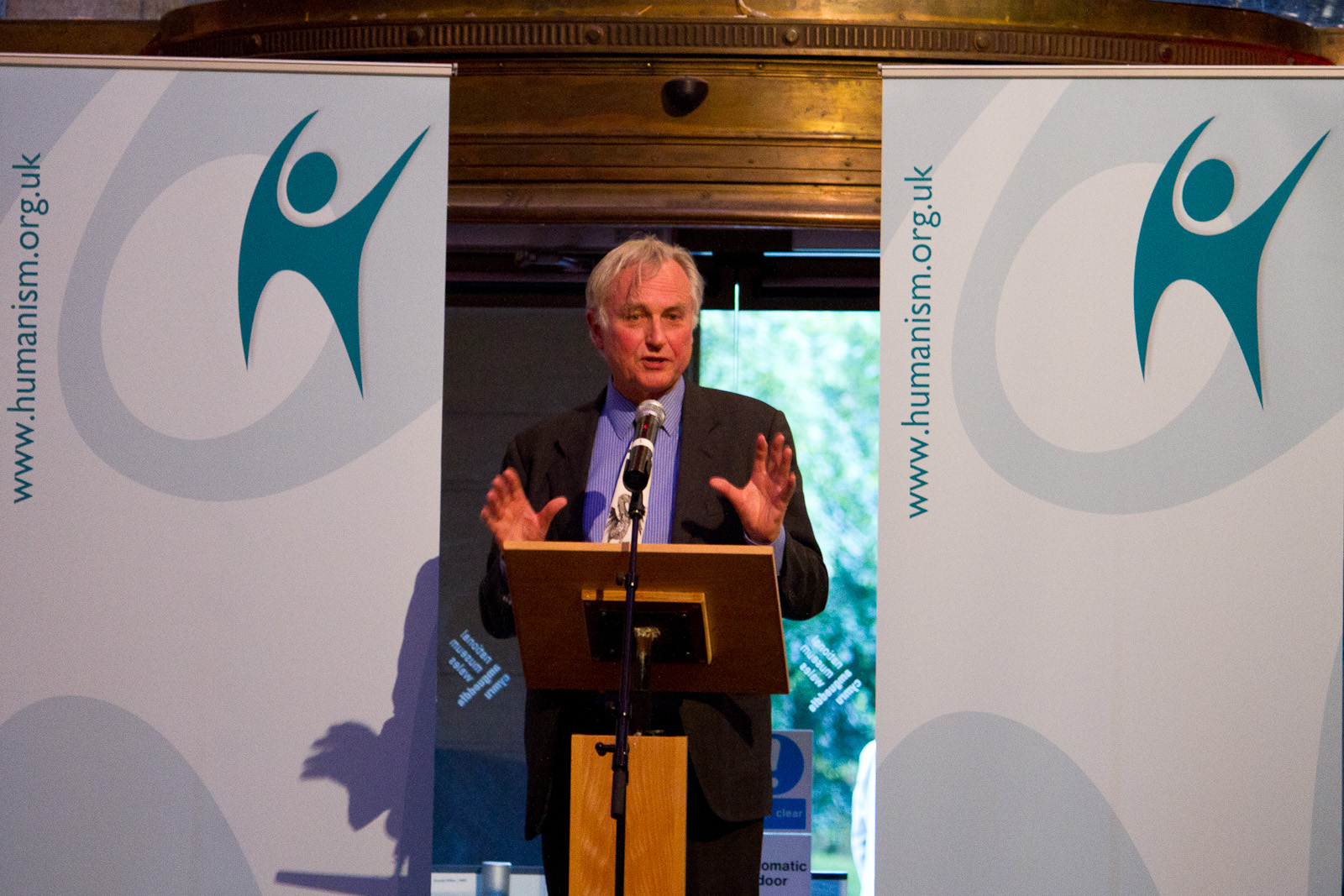
Richard Dawkins speaking at the British Humanist Association annual conference.

The Happy Human is an icon that has been adopted as an international symbol of secular humanism. Created by Dennis Barrington, the figure in the shape of a capital letter H was the winning design in a competition arranged by Humanists UK (formerly the British Humanist Association) in 1965. Various forms of it are now used across the world by humanist organisations of all sizes, including Humanists UK, Humanists International and The American Humanist Association (AHA).

The trademark is still held by Humanists UK, which freely licenses use of the symbol by bona fide Humanist organisations worldwide.

== Origins ==
The Happy Human was created in response to a Humanists UK competition in 1965, after many years of discussion as to what a logo should look like. After some time without progress, radio presenter Margaret Knight backed a popular movement among Humanists UK's membership to commission such a logo, triggering publicity officer Tom Vernon to announce the competition. Of the several hundred designs from a number of countries that were considered, Dennis Barrington's simple design was favoured for its perceived universalism. Within the space of a few years, the logo had emerged as a symbol of Humanism, not just of Humanists UK and was adopted by humanist organisations around the world.

Since the 1990s, humanist groups have taken on looser, more figurative versions of the Happy Human logo, such as the logos used by Humanisterna (Sweden), Humanistischer Verband Deutschlands (Germany), Union of Rationalist Atheists and Agnostics (Italy), and the European Humanist Federation. In 2017, the British Humanist Association, which originated the Happy Human, debuted a new, single line-drawing style Happy Human when it renamed as Humanists UK.

The Humanist Emblem of Spirit is an authorized inscription on Government headstones and markers in cemeteries of the National Cemetery Administration of the U.S. Department of Veterans Affairs and in Arlington National Cemetery.

== Variations of the Happy Human symbol ==
Original Happy Human symbol

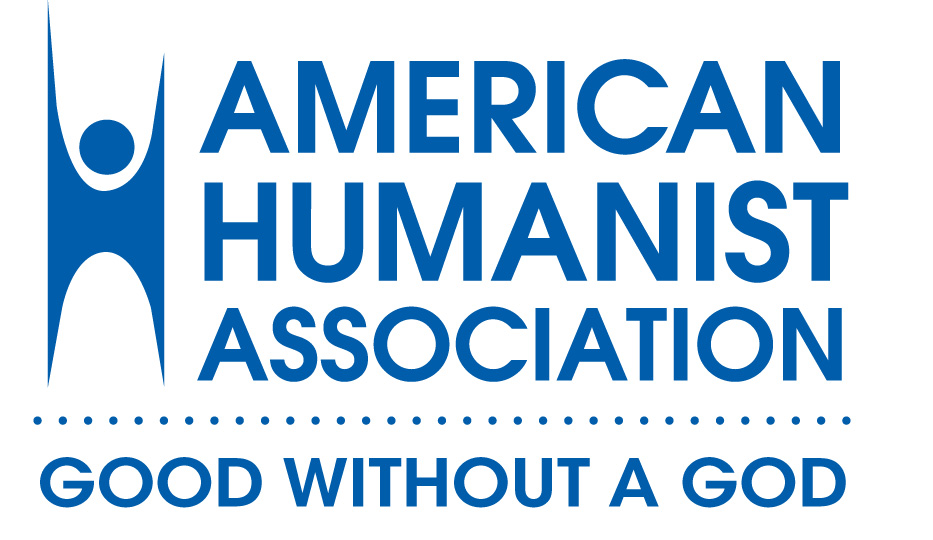
American Humanist Association logo

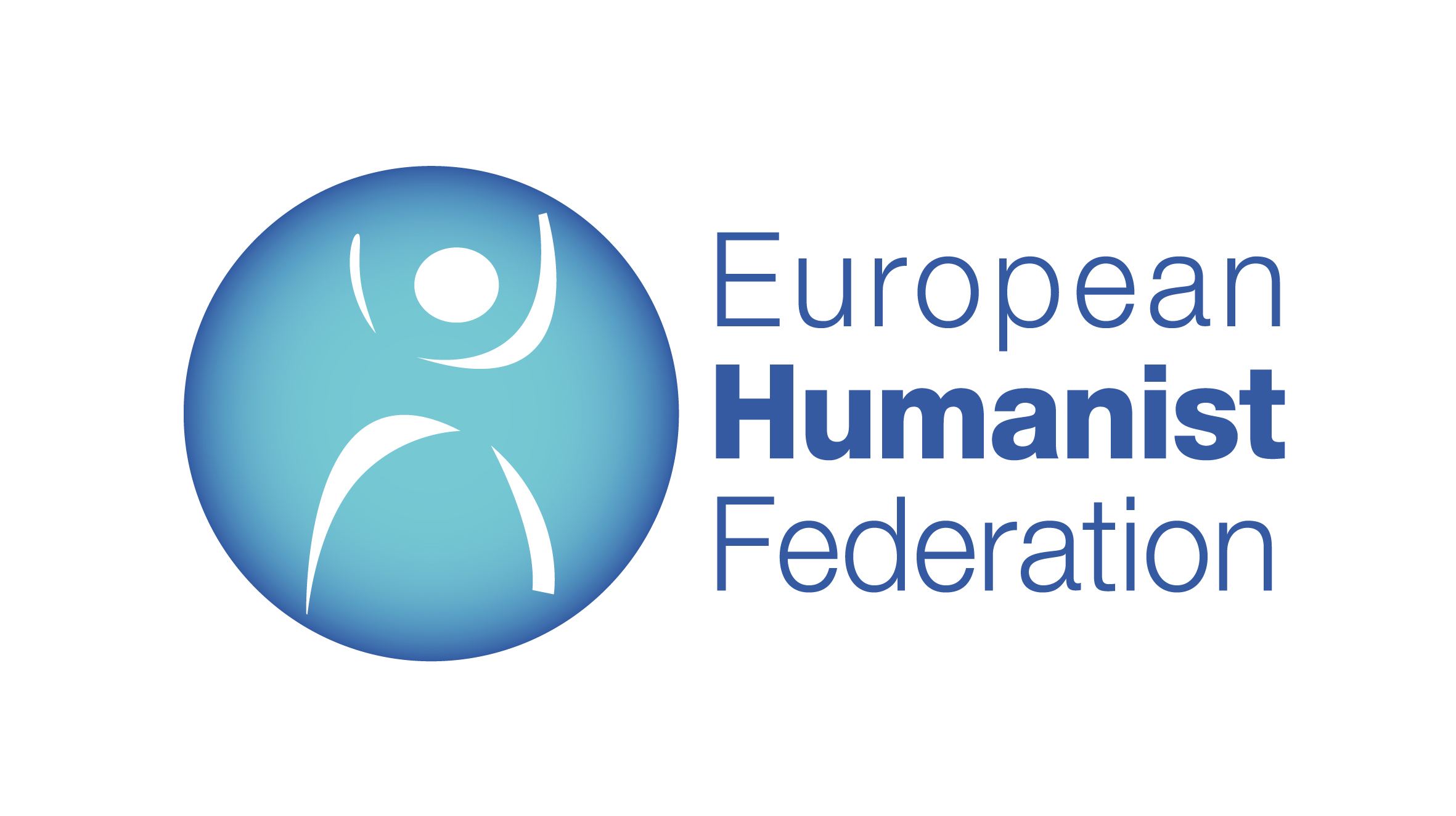
European Humanist Federation logo

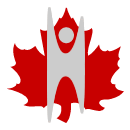
Humanist Canada logo

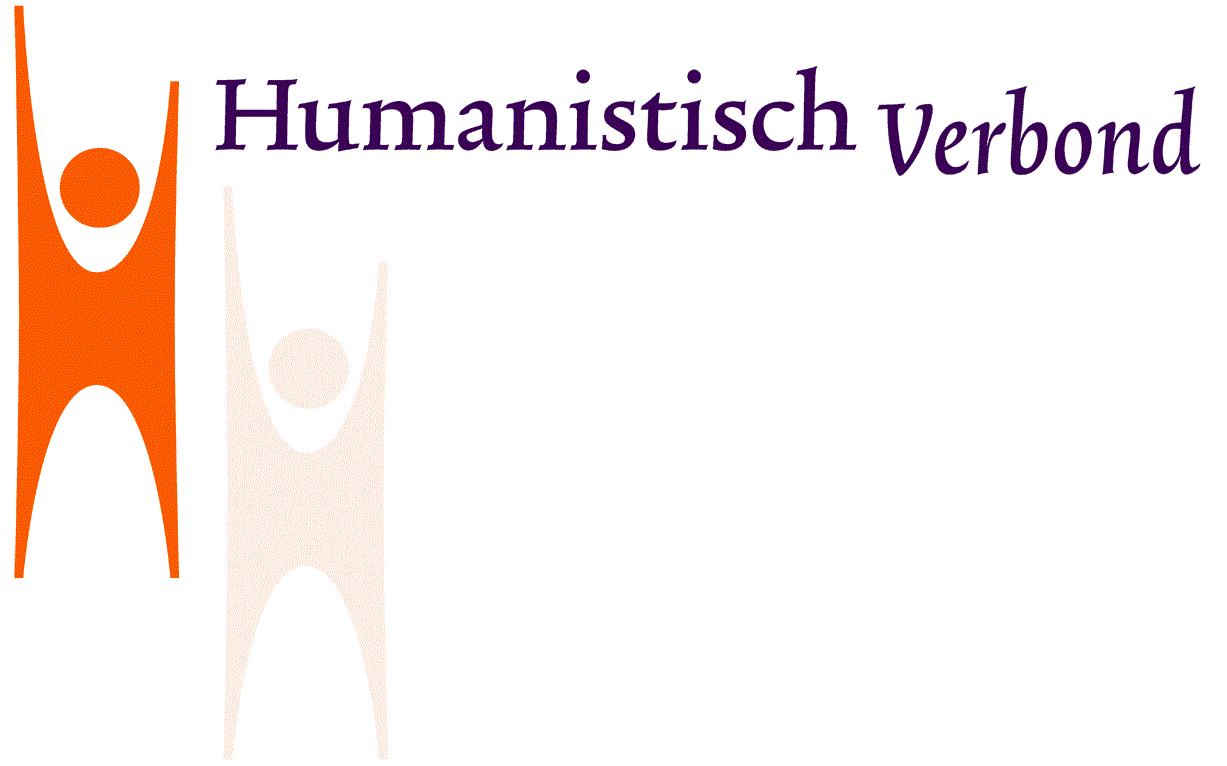
Former Humanistisch Verbond logo

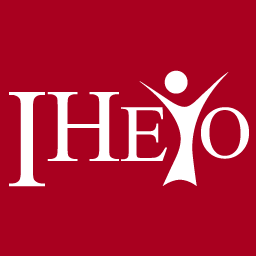
IHEYO logo (International Humanist Ethical Youth Organization)

== Organisations using the Happy Human ==
- American Humanist Association (US)
- Humanists UK (England, Wales and Northern Ireland)
- Council of Australian Humanist Societies (CAHS) (Australia)
- European Humanist Federation
- Romanian Secular-Humanist Association (ASUR) (Romania)
- LGBT Humanists UK
- Humanist Association of Ireland (Ireland)
- Humanist Alliance Philippines International (HAPI)
- Humanist Canada (Canada)
- Humanist Society of New Zealand (New Zealand)
- Humanist Society Scotland (Scotland)
- Humanistisch Verbond (Netherlands)
- Indian Humanist Union (India)
- Mumbai Rationalist Association (India)
- Institute for Humanist Studies
- International Humanist and Ethical Union
- Norwegian Humanist Association (Norway)
- Primera Iglesia Humanista de Puerto Rico (Puerto Rico)
- Siðmennt (Iceland)
- Swedish Humanist Association (Sweden)
- Union of Rationalist Atheists and Agnostics (Italy)
- Cyprus Humanist Association (Cyprus)

== Organisations using similar symbols ==
- Council for Secular Humanism
- Institute for Humane Studies
- Party of Humanists
