= Humanist celebrant =

Performer of humanist celebrancy services

A humanist celebrant or humanist officiant is a person who performs humanist celebrancy services, such as non-religious weddings, funerals, child namings, coming of age ceremonies and other rituals. Some humanist celebrants are accredited by humanist organisations, such as Humanists UK, Humanist Society Scotland (HSS), The Humanist Society (US), and the Humanist Association of Canada (HAC).

== Availability ==
Humanist ceremonies are conducted in every part of the world by humanist organizations, although the legal status of non-religious ceremonies of different kinds varies from place to place. In general, funeral ceremonies are not typically regulated by states, but many countries with a religious history have stricter guidelines on who can perform legal marriages. Naming ceremonies, similarly, can be held anywhere without legal implications. In countries where legal marriages can only be performed by religious institutions or the state (such as England), humanist weddings are often performed before or after a civil legal proceeding, but presented as the more meaningful or significant of the two events.

As of 2021, humanist celebrants can conduct legally binding marriage ceremonies in Scotland, Ireland, Northern Ireland, Jersey, Guernsey, Norway, Iceland, Australia, New Zealand, South Africa, Canada and the United States.

=== United Kingdom ===
The charity Humanists UK (formerly the British Humanist Association) pioneered the practice of offering humanist ceremonies, and today organises a network of celebrants or officiants across England, Wales and Northern Ireland. A similar network exists in Scotland, where, following a June 2005 ruling by the Registrar General, celebrants belonging to approved humanist associations have been permitted to conduct legal wedding ceremonies. Humanists UK celebrants in Northern Ireland were given the same rights in 2017 following a court case supported by Humanists UK.

In England and Wales the current legal position is that a humanist wedding or partnership ceremony must be supplemented by obtaining a civil marriage or partnership certificate through a Register Office. In December 2014 it was reported that the Prime Minister's Office was blocking the implementation of a change to give legal force to humanist weddings in England and Wales. That same year in Scotland, when same-sex marriage was legalised, the First Minister of Scotland attended the legal humanist marriage of a same-sex couple. In 2015, humanist weddings became more popular in Scotland than Church of Scotland weddings, or those of any religious denomination. The Humanist Society Scotland's status as a provider of humanist marriages in Scotland was reflected in statute from 2017 onwards.

Non-religious funerals are legal within the UK. Humanist celebrants are familiar with the procedures of cremation and burial, and are trained and experienced in devising and conducting suitable ceremonies. The British Humanist Association has in the past described officiants as follows:

Officiants are generally at least 35 years old, have experience of public speaking, and have probably had paid or voluntary experience in a caring/supporting profession – such as nursing, teaching, police or social work, for example. They must be able to cope with the emotional burden of regularly meeting and working with bereaved people - often in relation to particularly difficult or unexpected deaths, such as the death of a child in a road accident. Funeral directors are able to make arrangements with trained officiants in their local area.

Humanist funerals have reportedly been held in recent years for Claire Rayner, Keith Floyd, Linda Smith, Ronnie Barker, Lynsey de Paul, Terry Jones, Victoria Wood, Doris Lessing, John Noakes, David Nobbs, Cynthia Payne, Dale Winton, and Bob Monkhouse, among others. The humanist funeral for former First Minister of Wales Rhodri Morgan in 2017 was the first national funeral in the United Kingdom to be led by a humanist celebrant, former AM Lorraine Barrett, as well as the first national funeral held in Wales.

Celebrants also undertake humanist baby namings as a non-religious alternative to ceremonies such as christenings. The purpose is to recognise and celebrate the arrival of a child, and welcome him or her in the family and circle of friends.

=== Ireland ===
In Ireland, the Humanist Association of Ireland manages its own network of humanist ceremonies. Since 2012, these have been legally recognised, as in Scotland. In 2015, humanist marriages accounted for 6% of all marriages in Ireland, making them six times more popular than the Church of Ireland's weddings.

=== United States and Canada ===
Laws in each state of the United States vary about who has the right to perform wedding services, but humanist celebrants are usually categorized as "clergy" and have the same rights and responsibilities as ordained clergy. Humanist celebrants will perform both opposite-sex and same-sex marriage ceremonies. The Humanist Society, an adjunct of the American Humanist Association, maintains a list of humanist celebrants.

Humanists conduct wedding ceremonies across Canada. These typically happen under the auspices of the national Humanist Canada group or through one of the province-level groups such as the British Columbia Humanist Association.

=== Scandinavia ===
Humanist weddings, funerals, and naming ceremonies are popular throughout Scandinavia, where humanist groups tend to be well-established. Humanist coming-of-age ceremonies are also popular in these countries, and in particular Norway, where humanists also conduct legally binding weddings. In Norway, coming of age ceremonies are a cultural norm dating back to when it was a legal requirement for young people to have a church-led confirmation ceremony. In an increasingly secular population, many Norwegians turn to the Norwegian Humanist Association (NHA) instead for a "confirmation" that reflects their values. In 2017, 11,000 Norwegian young people registered for their ceremony with the NHA, representing nearly one in five young Norwegians.

=== Germany ===
Humanist groups providing ceremonies as part of Humanistischer Verband Deutschlands are well-established across Germany and are particularly prominent in many of Germany's cities, where majorities of residents are non-religious. As in Scandinavia, humanist coming-of-age ceremonies are very popular, due to secularisation and a pre-existing tradition of religious confirmation. Jugendweihe ceremonies have been on offer since at least 1852, although these days they are more likely to be referred to as Jugendfeier (youth celebration, as opposed to youth ordination). 8,500 young Germans took part in these ceremonies in 2015.

=== Italy ===
Humanist weddings are not legally recognized in Italy but, by law, civil weddings can be officiated by the mayor, or anyone delegated by the mayor, as long as they are adult Italian citizens, have active and passive suffrage and mayoral permission. With the mayor's permission, then, the couple can choose an independent celebrant who can marry them legally within a humanist ceremony. Even though they are not legally recognized in their own right, humanist or symbolic weddings have been celebrated in Italy for years, usually as an add-on to a civil marriage registration. An early example was celebrated in 2002 at Burio Castle in Asti, by Vera Pegna, then deputy secretary of UAAR (Union of Rationalist Atheists and Agnostics), one of the Italian humanist organizations . This organization was perhaps the first to promote training courses for humanist celebrants in Italy, using the British-trained Humanist celebrant Richard Brown as trainer. Other bodies and individuals now also offer training courses for prospective celebrants. The publication in 2020 (by UNI, the official Italian standards body) of an official document laid the basis for standardised courses with a common curriculum, leading for the first time to an officially recognised qualification for humanist and other celebrants. Note that this standards document uses the term non-traditional ceremonies to distinguish between non-religious and religious practices. In Italy, funerals are not subject to legal requirements in the way that weddings are, which means that humanist or independent celebrants can generally be called upon to officiate a funeral with no legal impediments. The main problem is that only some larger towns and cities provide an appropriate, officially recognized, well-equipped venue where a secular funeral can be held. Where this is lacking, non-religious ceremonies must be held outdoors, at the burial or scattering site, or in cramped, unbefitting environments.

=== Across Africa ===
Humanist ceremonies are conducted by trained humanist celebrants in many parts of Africa; many humanist associations in Africa have strong links with their European sister organisations, which have supported their development with training and capacity-building to provide weddings, funerals, and namings.

Currently, humanist weddings are not legally recognised in the continent of Africa except in South Africa, where humanists conduct legally binding marriage ceremonies. In Uganda, the African Humanist Celebrants Network has begun a process of lobbying the Government to provide for humanist marriages in law.

Trained humanists celebrants are available in Kenya, Tanzania, Rwanda, Burundi, Nigeria, Ghana, Zimbabwe, Malawi, and Sierra Leone.

== See also ==
- Celebrant (Australia)
- Civil funeral
  - Civil funeral celebrant
- Marriage officiant
