= Secular humanism =

Life stance that embraces human reason, secular ethics, and philosophical naturalism

Secular humanism is a philosophy, belief system, and life stance that embraces human reason, logic, secular ethics, and methodological naturalism, while specifically rejecting religious dogma, supernaturalism, mysticism, and superstition as the basis of morality and decision-making.

Secular humanism posits that human beings are capable of being ethical and moral without religion or belief in a deity. It does not, however, assume that humans are either inherently good or evil, nor does it present humans as being superior to nature. Rather, the humanist life stance emphasizes the unique responsibility facing humanity and the ethical consequences of human decisions. Fundamental to the concept of secular humanism is the strongly held viewpoint that ideology—be it religious or political—must be thoroughly examined by each individual and not simply accepted or rejected on faith. Along with this, an essential part of secular humanism is a continually adapting search for truth, primarily through science and philosophy. Many secular humanists derive their moral codes from a philosophy of utilitarianism, ethical naturalism, or evolutionary ethics, and some advocate a science of morality.

Humanists International, founded by Julian Huxley and Jaap van Praag, is the world union of more than one hundred humanist, rationalist, irreligious, atheist, Bright, secular, Ethical Culture, and freethought organizations in more than 40 countries. The "Happy Human" is recognized as the official symbol of humanism internationally, used by secular humanist organizations in every part of the world.

The term itself is not uncontested. "Secular humanism" is not a universally used phrase, and is most prevalent in the United States; some even consider it an Americanism, as most European, African, and Asian countries use "humanism" without an adjective to refer to the same concept. Some international use of qualifying adjectives, including "secular" and "religious", has also been based on "false etymological and historical assumptions" about humanism.

== Terminology ==
The meaning of the phrase secular humanism has evolved over time. The phrase has been used since at least the 1930s by Anglican priests, and in 1943 the Archbishop of Canterbury, William Temple, was reported as warning that the "Christian tradition... was in danger of being undermined by a 'Secular Humanism' which hoped to retain Christian values without Christian faith." During the 1960s and 1970s the term was embraced by some humanists who considered themselves anti-religious, as well as those who, although not critical of religion in its various forms, preferred a non-religious approach. The release in 1980 of A Secular Humanist Declaration by the newly formed Council for Democratic and Secular Humanism (CODESH, later the Council for Secular Humanism, which with CSICOP in 1991 jointly formed the Center for Inquiry and in 2015 both ceased separate operations, becoming CFI programs) gave secular humanism an organisational identity within the United States; but no overall organisation involved currently uses a name featuring "secular humanism".

However, many adherents of the approach reject the use of the word secular as obfuscating and confusing, and consider that the term secular humanism has been "demonized by the religious right... All too often secular humanism is reduced to a sterile outlook consisting of little more than secularism slightly broadened by academic ethics. This kind of 'hyphenated humanism' easily becomes more about the adjective than its referent". Adherents of this view, including Humanists International and the American Humanist Association, consider that the unmodified but capitalized word Humanism should be used. The endorsement by the International Humanist and Ethical Union (IHEU) of the capitalization of the word Humanism, and the dropping of any adjective such as secular, is quite recent. The American Humanist Association began to adopt this view in 1973, and the IHEU formally endorsed the position in 1989. In 2002 the IHEU General Assembly unanimously adopted the Amsterdam Declaration, which represents the official defining statement of World Humanism for Humanists. This declaration makes exclusive use of capitalized Humanist and Humanism, which is consistent with IHEU's general practice and recommendations for promoting a unified Humanist identity. To further promote Humanist identity, these words are also free of any adjectives, as recommended by prominent members of IHEU. Such usage is not universal among IHEU member organizations, though most of them do observe these conventions.

== History ==
The historical use of the term humanism (reflected in some current academic usage), is related to the writings of pre-Socratic philosophers. These writings were lost to European societies until Renaissance scholars rediscovered them through Muslim sources and translated them from Arabic into European languages. Thus the term humanist can mean a humanities scholar, as well as refer to The Enlightenment/ Renaissance intellectuals, and those who have agreement with the pre-Socratics, as distinct from the later secular humanists.

As a term, humanism did not enter into the English language until the 19th century and indicates the difference between the Renaissance humanist scholars on the one hand and the secular humanist movements of the 20th and 21st centuries on the other, which are explicitly non-religious or atheistic.

=== Secularism ===
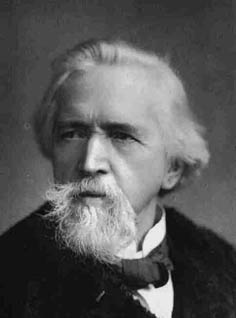
George Holyoake coined the term "secularism" and led the secular movement in Britain from the mid-19th century.

In 1851 George Holyoake coined the term "secularism" to describe "a form of opinion which concerns itself only with questions, the issues of which can be tested by the experience of this life".

The modern secular movement coalesced around Holyoake, Charles Bradlaugh and their intellectual circle. The first secular society, the Leicester Secular Society, dates from 1851. Similar regional societies came together to form the National Secular Society in 1866.

=== Positivism and the Church of Humanity ===
Holyoake's secularism was strongly influenced by Auguste Comte, the founder of positivism and of modern sociology. Comte believed human history would progress in a "law of three stages" from a theological phase, to the "metaphysical", toward a fully rational "positivist" society. In later life, Comte had attempted to introduce a "religion of humanity" in light of growing anti-religious sentiment and social malaise in revolutionary France. This religion would necessarily fulfil the functional, cohesive role that supernatural religion once served.

Although Comte's religious movement was unsuccessful in France, the positivist philosophy of science itself played a major role in the proliferation of secular organizations in the 19th century in England. Richard Congreve visited Paris shortly after the French Revolution of 1848 where he met Auguste Comte and was heavily influenced by his positivist system. He founded the London Positivist Society in 1867, which attracted Frederic Harrison, Edward Spencer Beesly, Vernon Lushington, and James Cotter Morison amongst others.

In 1878, the Society established the Church of Humanity under Congreve's direction. There they introduced sacraments of the Religion of Humanity and published a co-operative translation of Comte's Positive Polity. When Congreve repudiated their Paris co-religionists in 1878, Beesly, Harrison, Bridges, and others formed their own positivist society, with Beesly as president, and opened a rival centre, Newton Hall, in a courtyard off Fleet Street.

The New York City version of the church was established by English immigrant Henry Edger. The American version of the "Church of Humanity" was largely modeled on the English church. Like the English version, it was not atheistic and had sermons and sacramental rites. At times the services included readings from conventional religious works like the Book of Isaiah. It was not as significant as the church in England, but did include several educated people.

=== Ethical movement ===
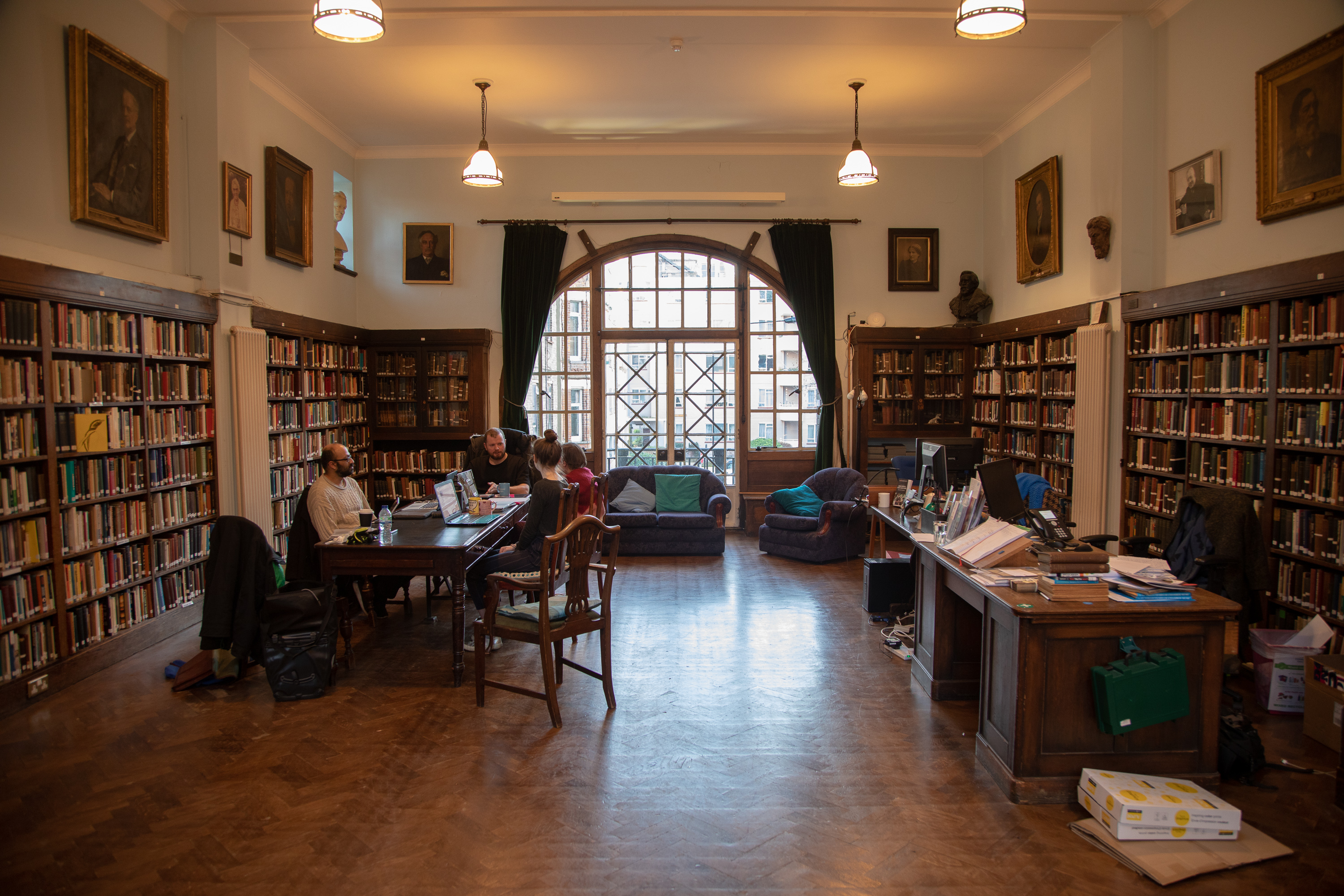
Conway Hall in London

Another important precursor was the ethical movement of the 19th century. The South Place Ethical Society was founded in 1793 as the South Place Chapel on Finsbury Square, on the edge of the City of London, and in the early nineteenth century was known as "a radical gathering-place". At that point it was a Unitarian chapel, and that movement, like Quakers, supported female equality. Under the leadership of Reverend William Johnson Fox, it lent its pulpit to activists such as Anna Wheeler, one of the first women to campaign for feminism at public meetings in England, who spoke in 1829 on "rights of women". In later decades, the chapel changed its name to the South Place Ethical Society, now the Conway Hall Ethical Society. Today Conway Hall explicitly identifies itself as a humanist organisation, albeit one primarily focused on concerts, events, and the maintenance of its humanist library and archives. It bills itself as "The landmark of London's independent intellectual, political and cultural life."

In America, the ethical movement was propounded by Felix Adler, who established the New York Society for Ethical Culture in 1877. By 1886, similar societies had sprouted up in Philadelphia, Chicago and St. Louis.

These societies all adopted the same statement of principles:

- The belief that morality is independent of theology;
- The affirmation that new moral problems have arisen in modern industrial society which have not been adequately dealt with by the world's religions;
- The duty to engage in philanthropy in the advancement of morality;
- The belief that self-reform should go in lock step with social reform;
- The establishment of republican rather than monarchical governance of Ethical societies;
- The agreement that educating the young is the most important aim.

In effect, the movement responded to the religious crisis of the time by replacing theology with unadulterated morality. It aimed to "disentangle moral ideas from religious doctrines, metaphysical systems, and ethical theories, and to make them an independent force in personal life and social relations." Adler was also particularly critical of the religious emphasis on creed, believing it to be the source of sectarian bigotry. He therefore attempted to provide a universal fellowship devoid of ritual and ceremony, for those who would otherwise be divided by creeds. Although the organisation was overwhelmingly made up of (and entirely led by) atheists, and were many of the same people as in the secular movement, Ethical organisations at that time publicly avoided debate about religious beliefs, publicly advocating neither atheism nor theism, agnosticism nor deism, instead stressing "deed without creed" and a "purely human basis" for morality.

The first ethical society along these lines in Britain was founded in 1886. By 1896 the four London societies formed the Union of Ethical Societies, and between 1905 and 1910 there were over fifty societies in Great Britain, seventeen of which were affiliated with the Union. The Union of Ethical Societies would later incorporate as the Ethical Union, a registered charity, in 1928. Under the leadership of Harold Blackham, it renamed itself the British Humanist Association in 1967. It became the Humanists UK in 2017.

=== Secular humanism ===
In the 1930s, "humanism" was generally used in a religious sense by the Ethical movement in the United States, and not much favoured among the non-religious in Britain. Yet "it was from the Ethical movement that the non-religious philosophical sense of Humanism gradually emerged in Britain, and it was from the convergence of the Ethical and Rationalist movements that this sense of Humanism eventually prevailed throughout the Freethought movement".

As an organised movement in its own right, humanism emerged from vibrant non-religious movements of the 18th and 19th centuries such as the Owenites, Ethical Culture, the freethinkers, secularists, and positivists, as well as a few non-religious radical Unitarian congregations. The first Humanist Manifesto announced the humanist movement by that name to the public in 1933, following work at the University of Chicago across the 1920s. The American Humanist Association was incorporated as an Illinois non-profit organization in 1943. The International Humanist and Ethical Union was founded in 1952, when a gathering of world Humanists met under the leadership of Sir Julian Huxley. The British Humanist Association took that name in 1967, but had developed from the Union of Ethical Societies which had been founded by Stanton Coit in 1896.

== Manifestos and declarations ==
Humanists have put together various Humanist Manifestos, in attempts to unify the Humanist identity.

The original signers of the first Humanist Manifesto of 1933, declared themselves to be religious humanists. Because, in their view, traditional religions were failing to meet the needs of their day, the signers of 1933 declared it a necessity to establish a religion that was a dynamic force to meet the needs of the day. However, this "religion" did not profess a belief in any god. Since then two additional Manifestos were written to replace the first. In the Preface of Humanist Manifesto II, in 1973, the authors Paul Kurtz and Edwin H. Wilson assert that faith and knowledge are required for a hopeful vision for the future. Manifesto II references a section on religion and states traditional religion renders a disservice to humanity. Manifesto II recognizes the following groups to be part of their naturalistic philosophy: "scientific", "ethical", "democratic", "religious", and "Marxist" humanism.

=== Humanists International ===
Humanist beliefs and values are as old as civilization and have a history in most societies around the world. Modern humanism is the culmination of these long traditions of reasoning about meaning and ethics, the source of inspiration for many of the world’s great thinkers, artists, and humanitarians, and is interwoven with the rise of modern science. — Humanists International, Amsterdam Declaration 2022

The Amsterdam Declaration is the name of an attempt by humanist organisations around the world to define humanism. First passed in 1952 at the inaugural general assembly of Humanists International (then known as the International Humanist and Ethical Union), it was subsequently revised in 2002 and again in 2022. The wording of the 1952 declaration reflected some contemporary anxieties relating to the Cold War, while the 2002 Declaration was an attempt to substantially simplify the statement and make it less time-bound and more internationally accessible.

The 2022 declaration mentions religion only once, and explains that its purpose is to "make people aware of these essentials of the humanist worldview," which it details under four headings.

1. Humanists strive to be ethical
2. Humanists strive to be rational
3. Humanists strive for fulfilment in their lives
4. Humanism meets the widespread demand for a source of meaning and purpose and to stand as an alternative to dogmatic religion, authoritarian nationalism, tribal sectarianism, and selfish nihilism

Since 1996, all member organisations of Humanist International have been required to accept the organisation's definition of humanism, which is as follows:

Humanism is a democratic and ethical life stance, which affirms that human beings have the right and responsibility to give meaning and shape to their own lives. It stands for the building of a more humane society through an ethic based on human and other natural values in the spirit of reason and free inquiry through human capabilities. It is not theistic, and it does not accept supernatural views of reality.

Traditionally, Humanists International policy also encouraged its members to take steps to promote a uniform global identity for humanism, including by discouraging the use of "hyphenated adjectives" (such as "secular" humanism or "religious humanism") and instead refer simply to "Humanism" with a capital H, and through global usage of the Happy Human symbol to represent humanism.

=== Council for Secular Humanism ===
According to the Council for Secular Humanism, within the United States, the term "secular humanism" describes a world view with the following elements and principles:

- Need to test beliefs – A conviction that dogmas, ideologies and traditions, whether religious, political or social, must be weighed and tested by each individual and not simply accepted by faith.
- Reason, evidence, scientific method – A commitment to the use of critical reason, factual evidence and scientific method of inquiry in seeking solutions to human problems and answers to important human questions.
- Fulfillment, growth, creativity – A primary concern with fulfillment, growth and creativity for both the individual and humankind in general.
- Search for truth – A constant search for objective truth, with the understanding that new knowledge and experience constantly alter our imperfect perception of it.
- This life – A concern for this life (as opposed to an afterlife) and a commitment to making it meaningful through better understanding of ourselves, our history, our intellectual and artistic achievements, and the outlooks of those who differ from us.
- Ethics – A search for viable individual, social and political principles of ethical conduct, judging them on their ability to enhance human well-being and individual responsibility.
- Justice and fairness – an interest in securing justice and fairness in society and in eliminating discrimination and intolerance.
- Building a better world – A conviction that with reason, an open exchange of ideas, good will, and tolerance, progress can be made in building a better world for ourselves and our children.

A Secular Humanist Declaration was issued in 1980 by the Council for Secular Humanism's predecessor, CODESH. It lays out ten ideals: Free inquiry as opposed to censorship and imposition of belief; separation of church and state; the ideal of freedom from religious control and from jingoistic government control; ethics based on critical intelligence rather than that deduced from religious belief; moral education; religious skepticism; reason; a belief in science and technology as the best way of understanding the world; evolution; and education as the essential method of building humane, free, and democratic societies.

=== American Humanist Association ===
A general outline of Humanism is also set out in the Humanist Manifesto prepared by the American Humanist Association.

== Ethics and relationship to religious belief ==
In the 20th and 21st centuries, members of Humanist organizations have disagreed as to whether Humanism is a religion. They categorize themselves in one of three ways. Religious (or ethical) humanism, in the tradition of the earliest humanist organizations in the UK and US, attempts to fulfil the traditional social role of religion. Contemporary use of the word "religious" did not have the same connotations as its today. Secular humanism considers all forms of religion, including religious humanism, to be superseded.

However, distinctions between "ethical" and "secular" humanists are for the most part historical, and practically meaningless in the present day or to contemporary individuals who identify with humanism. Since the mid-20th century, the development of new concepts such as the "life stance" (which encompasses both humanist views and religious outlooks) has defused this conflict. Most humanist organisations identify with "humanism" without a pre-modifier (such a "secular" or "ethical") and assert humanism as a non-religious philosophy or approach to life. Generally speaking, all humanists, including religious humanists, reject deference to supernatural beliefs; promote the practical, methodological naturalism of science; and largely endorse the stance of metaphysical naturalism. The result is an approach to issues in a secular way. Humanism addresses ethics without reference to the supernatural as well, attesting that ethics is a human enterprise (see naturalistic ethics).

Accounts of humanism are also careful not to treat secular humanism analogously with religions, which implies a community who strictly attempt to adhere to the same obligations or beliefs. Holding a secular humanist philosophy does not prescribe a specific theory of morality or code of ethics. As stated by the Council for Secular Humanism,

Secular Humanism is not so much a specific morality as it is a method for the explanation and discovery of rational moral principles.

Secular humanists affirm that with the present state of scientific knowledge, dogmatic belief in an absolutist moral or ethical system (e.g. Kantian, Islamic, Christian) is unreasonable. However, it affirms that individuals engaging in rational moral/ethical deliberations can discover some universal "objective standards".

We are opposed to absolutist morality, yet we maintain that objective standards emerge, and ethical values and principles may be discovered, in the course of ethical deliberation.

Many humanists adopt principles of the Golden Rule. Some believe that universal moral standards are required for the proper functioning of society. However, they believe such necessary universality can and should be achieved by developing a richer notion of morality through reason, experience and scientific inquiry rather than through faith in a supernatural realm or source.

Fundamentalists correctly perceive that universal moral standards are required for the proper functioning of society. But they erroneously believe that God is the only possible source of such standards. Philosophers as diverse as Plato, Immanuel Kant, John Stuart Mill, George Edward Moore, and John Rawls have demonstrated that it is possible to have a universal morality without God. Contrary to what the fundamentalists would have us believe, then, what our society really needs is not more religion but a richer notion of the nature of morality.

Humanists Andrew Copson and Alice Roberts, in their casual introduction to humanism The Little Book of Humanism, propose that a distinctive aspect of humanist morality is its recognition that every moral situation is in some sense unique, and so potentially calls for different approach than the last (i.e. the ability to vacillate situationally between consequentialism and virtue ethics). In the book, they quote from Kristen Bell's advocacy of moral particularism as developed by Jonathan Dancy.

Humanism is compatible with atheism, and by definition usually entails at least a form of weak or agnostic atheism, and agnosticism, but being atheist or agnostic does not automatically make one a humanist. Nevertheless, humanism is diametrically opposed to state atheism. According to Paul Kurtz, considered by some to be the founder of the American secular humanist movement, one of the differences between Marxist–Leninist atheists and humanists is the latter's commitment to "human freedom and democracy" while stating that the militant atheism of the Soviet Union consistently violated basic human rights. Kurtz also stated that the "defense of religious liberty is as precious to the humanist as are the rights of the believers". Greg M. Epstein states that, "modern, organized Humanism began, in the minds of its founders, as nothing more nor less than a religion without a God".

Many humanists address ethics from the point of view of ethical naturalism, and some support an actual science of morality.

== Modern context ==
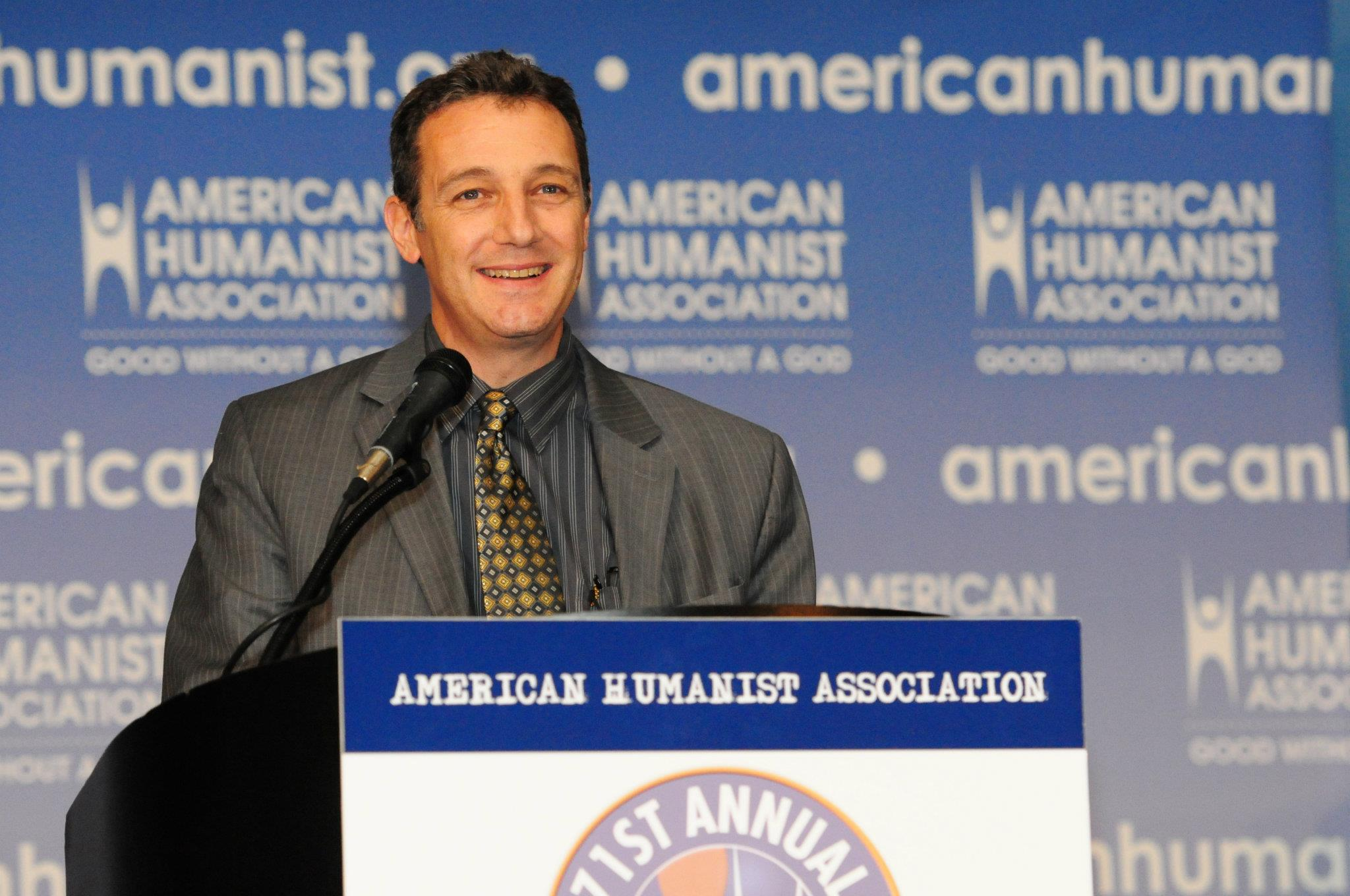
David Niose, president of the American Humanist Association, speaks at a 2012 conference.

Secular humanist organizations are found in all parts of the world. Those who call themselves humanists are estimated to number between four and five million people worldwide in 31 countries, but there is uncertainty because of the lack of universal definition throughout censuses. Humanism is a non-theistic belief system and, as such, it could be a sub-category of "religion" only if that term is defined to mean "religion and (any) belief system". This is the case in the International Covenant on Civil and Political Rights on freedom of religion and beliefs. Many national censuses contentiously define humanism as a further sub-category of the sub-category "no religion", which typically includes atheist, rationalist and agnostic thought. In England, Wales 25% of people specify that they have "no religion" up from 15% in 2001 and in Australia, around 30% of the population specifies "no religion" in the national census. In the US, the decennial census does not inquire about religious affiliation or its lack; surveys report the figure at roughly 13%. In the 2001 Canadian census, 16.5% of the populace reported having no religious affiliation. In the 2011 Scottish census, 37% stated they had no religion up from 28% in 2001. One of the largest Humanist organizations in the world (relative to population) is Norway's Human-Etisk Forbund, which had over 86,000 members out of a population of around 4.6 million in 2013 – approximately 2% of the population.

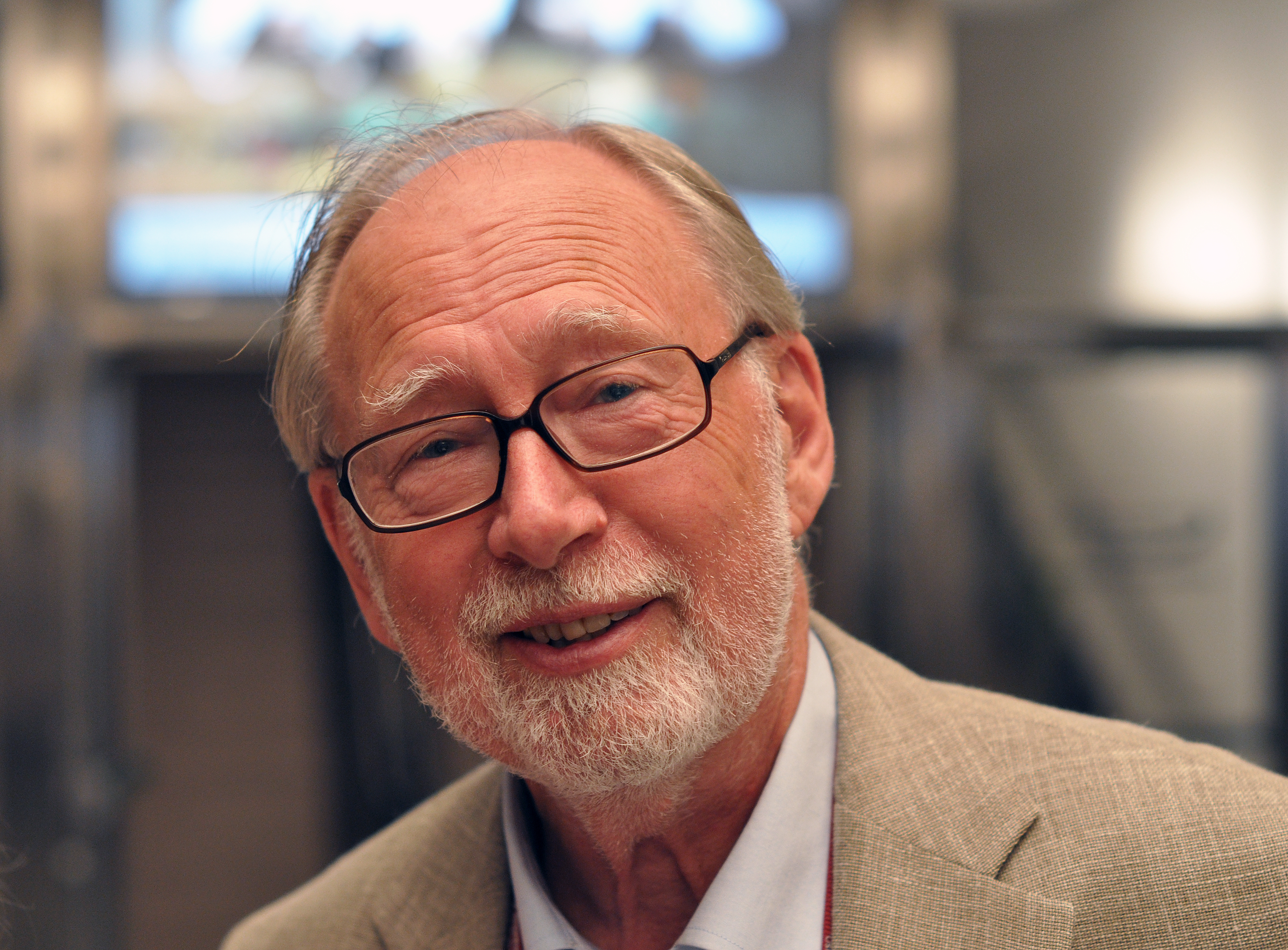
Levi Fragell, former Secretary General of the Norwegian Humanist Association and former president of the International Humanist and Ethical Union, at the World Humanist Congress 2011 in Oslo

The International Humanist and Ethical Union (IHEU) is the worldwide umbrella organization for those adhering to the Humanist life stance. It represents the views of over three million Humanists organized in over 100 national organizations in 30 countries. Originally based in the Netherlands, the IHEU now operates from London. Some regional groups that adhere to variants of the Humanist life stance, such as the humanist subgroup of the Unitarian Universalist Association, do not belong to the IHEU. Although the European Humanist Federation is also separate from the IHEU, the two organisations work together and share an agreed protocol.

Starting in the mid-20th century, religious fundamentalists and the religious right began using the term "secular humanism" in hostile fashion. Francis A. Schaeffer, an American theologian based in Switzerland, seizing upon the exclusion of the divine from most humanist writings, argued that rampant secular humanism would lead to moral relativism and ethical bankruptcy in his book How Should We Then Live: The Rise and Decline of Western Thought and Culture (1976). Schaeffer portrayed secular humanism as pernicious and diabolical, and warned it would undermine the moral and spiritual tablet of America. His themes have been very widely repeated in Fundamentalist preaching in North America. Toumey (1993) found that secular humanism is typically portrayed as a vast evil conspiracy, deceitful and immoral, responsible for feminism, pornography, abortion, homosexuality, and New Age spirituality. In certain areas of the world, Humanism finds itself in conflict with religious fundamentalism, especially over the issue of the separation of church and state. Many Humanists see religions as superstitious, repressive and closed-minded, while religious fundamentalists may see Humanists as a threat to the values set out in their sacred texts.

In recent years, writers such as Dwight Gilbert Jones and R. Joseph Hoffmann have decried what they see as the over-association of Humanism with affirmations of non-belief and atheism. Jones argued that in recent times humanism espoused and debated very few new ideas outside of secularism, while Hoffmann is unequivocal: "I regard the use of the term 'humanism' to mean secular humanism or atheism to be one of the greatest tragedies of twentieth century movementology, perpetrated by second-class minds and perpetuated by third-class polemicists and village atheists. The attempt to sever humanism from the religious and the spiritual was a flatfooted, largely American way of taking on the religious right. It lacked finesse, subtlety, and the European sense of history."

== Humanist celebrations ==
Humanism, as a term which describes a person's non-religious views, comes with no obligation to celebrate or revere specific days in the year as a religion would. As a result, individual humanists choose of their own accord whether to take part in prevailing national holidays where they live. For example, humanists in Europe and North America typically celebrate holidays, such as Christmas, but as secular holidays rather than Christian festivals. Other humanists choose to mark the winter and summer solstices and the equinoxes. European humanists may often emphasise the fact that human beings have found reasons to celebrate at these times in the Northern Hemisphere for thousands of years before the arrival of Christianity. Humanists may also identify culturally with religious traditions and holidays celebrated in their family in the community. For example, humanists with a Jewish identity will often celebrate most Jewish holidays in a secular manner.

Humanists International endorses World Humanist Day (21 June), Darwin Day (12 February), Human Rights Day (10 December) and HumanLight (23 December) as official days of humanist celebration, though none are yet a public holiday. Humanist organisations typically organise events around these dates which draw attention to their programmes of activities.

In many countries, humanist celebrants (officiants) perform celebrancy services for weddings, funerals, child namings, coming of age ceremonies, and other rituals. In countries like Scotland and Norway, these are extremely popular. In Scotland, more people have a humanist wedding than are married by any religious denomination, including Scotland's largest churches; over 20% of Scottish weddings are humanist. In Norway, over 20% of young people choose humanist coming-of-age ceremonies every year.

== Legal mentions in the United States ==
The issue of whether and in what sense secular humanism might be considered a religion, and what the implications of this would be, has become the subject of legal maneuvering and political debate in the United States. The first reference to "secular humanism" in a US legal context was in 1961, although church-state separation lawyer Leo Pfeffer had referred to it in his 1958 book, Creeds in Competition.

=== Hatch amendment ===
The Education for Economic Security Act of 1984 included a section, Section 20 U.S.C.A. 4059, which initially read: "Grants under this subchapter ['Magnet School Assistance'] may not be used for consultants, for transportation or for any activity which does not augment academic improvement." With no public notice, Senator Orrin Hatch tacked onto the proposed exclusionary subsection the words "or for any course of instruction the substance of which is Secular Humanism". Implementation of this provision ran into practical problems because neither the Senator's staff, nor the Senate's Committee on Labor and Human Resources, nor the Department of Justice could propose a definition of what would constitute a "course of instruction the substance of which is Secular Humanism". So, this determination was left up to local school boards. The provision provoked a storm of controversy which within a year led Senator Hatch to propose, and Congress to pass, an amendment to delete from the statute all reference to secular humanism. While this episode did not dissuade fundamentalists from continuing to object to what they regarded as the "teaching of Secular Humanism", it did point out the vagueness of the claim.

=== Case law ===
==== Torcaso v. Watkins ====
The phrase "secular humanism" became prominent after it was used in the United States Supreme Court case Torcaso v. Watkins. In the 1961 decision, Justice Hugo Black commented in a footnote, "Among religions in this country which do not teach what would generally be considered a belief in the existence of God are Buddhism, Taoism, Ethical Culture, Secular Humanism, and others."

==== Fellowship of Humanity v. County of Alameda ====
The footnote in Torcaso v. Watkins referenced Fellowship of Humanity v. County of Alameda, a 1957 case in which an organization of humanists sought a tax exemption on the ground that they used their property "solely and exclusively for religious worship." Despite the group's non-theistic beliefs, the court determined that the activities of the Fellowship of Humanity, which included weekly Sunday meetings, were analogous to the activities of theistic churches and thus entitled to an exemption. The Fellowship of Humanity case itself referred to Humanism but did not mention the term secular humanism. Nonetheless, this case was cited by Justice Black to justify the inclusion of secular humanism in the list of religions in his note. Presumably Justice Black added the word secular to emphasize the non-theistic nature of the Fellowship of Humanity and distinguish their brand of humanism from that associated with, for example, Christian humanism.

==== Washington Ethical Society v. District of Columbia ====
Another case alluded to in the Torcaso v. Watkins footnote, and said by some to have established secular humanism as a religion under the law, is the 1957 tax case of Washington Ethical Society v. District of Columbia, 249 F.2d 127 (D.C. Cir. 1957). The Washington Ethical Society functions much like a church, but regards itself as a non-theistic religious institution, honoring the importance of ethical living without mandating a belief in a supernatural origin for ethics. The case involved denial of the Society's application for tax exemption as a religious organization. The U.S. Court of Appeals reversed the Tax Court's ruling, defined the Society as a religious organization, and granted its tax exemption. The Society terms its practice Ethical Culture. Though Ethical Culture is based on a humanist philosophy, it is regarded by some as a type of religious humanism. Hence, it would seem most accurate to say that this case affirmed that a religion need not be theistic to qualify as a religion under the law, rather than asserting that it established generic secular humanism as a religion.

In the cases of both the Fellowship of Humanity and the Washington Ethical Society, the court decisions turned not so much on the particular beliefs of practitioners as on the function and form of the practice being similar to the function and form of the practices in other religious institutions.

==== Peloza v. Capistrano School District ====
The implication in Justice Black's footnote that secular humanism is a religion has been seized upon by religious opponents of the teaching of evolution, who have made the argument that teaching evolution amounts to teaching a religious idea. The claim that secular humanism could be considered a religion for legal purposes was examined by the United States Court of Appeals for the Ninth Circuit in Peloza v. Capistrano School District, 37 F.3d 517 (9th Cir. 1994), cert. denied, 515 U.S. 1173 (1995). In this case, a science teacher argued that, by requiring him to teach evolution, his school district was forcing him to teach the "religion" of secular humanism. The Court responded, "We reject this claim because neither the Supreme Court, nor this circuit, has ever held that evolutionism or Secular Humanism are 'religions' for Establishment Clause purposes." The Supreme Court refused to review the case.

The decision in a subsequent case, Kalka v. Hawk et al., offered this commentary:

The Court's statement in Torcaso does not stand for the proposition that humanism, no matter in what form and no matter how practiced, amounts to a religion under the First Amendment. The Court offered no test for determining what system of beliefs qualified as a "religion" under the First Amendment. The most one may read into the Torcaso footnote is the idea that a particular non-theistic group calling itself the "Fellowship of Humanity" qualified as a religious organization under California law.

=== Controversy ===
Decisions about tax status have been based on whether an organization functions like a church. On the other hand, Establishment Clause cases turn on whether the ideas or symbols involved are inherently religious. An organization can function like a church while advocating beliefs that are not necessarily inherently religious. Author Marci Hamilton has pointed out: "Moreover, the debate is not between secularists and the religious. The debate is believers and non-believers on the one side debating believers and non-believers on the other side. You've got citizens who are [...] of faith who believe in the separation of church and state and you have a set of believers who do not believe in the separation of church and state."

In the 1987 case of Smith v. Board of School Commissioners of Mobile County a group of plaintiffs brought a case alleging that the school system was teaching the tenets of an anti-religious religion called "secular humanism" in violation of the Establishment Clause. The complainants asked that 44 different elementary through high school level textbooks (including books on home economics, social science and literature) be removed from the curriculum. Federal judge William Brevard Hand ruled for the plaintiffs agreeing that the books promoted secular humanism, which he ruled to be a religion. The Eleventh Circuit Court unanimously reversed him, with Judge Frank stating that Hand held a "misconception of the relationship between church and state mandated by the establishment clause," commenting also that the textbooks did not show "an attitude antagonistic to theistic belief. The message conveyed by these textbooks is one of neutrality: the textbooks neither endorse theistic religion as a system of belief, nor discredit it".

== Manifestos ==
There are numerous Humanist Manifestos and Declarations, including the following:

- Humanist Manifesto I (1933)
- Humanist Manifesto II (1973)
- A Secular Humanist Declaration (1980)
- A Declaration of Interdependence (1988)
- IHEU Minimum Statement on Humanism (1996)
- HUMANISM: Why, What, and What For, in 882 Words (1996)
- Humanist Manifesto 2000: A Call for a New Planetary Humanism (2000)
- The Affirmations of Humanism: A Statement of Principles
- Amsterdam Declaration (2002)
- Humanism and Its Aspirations: Humanist Manifesto III, a Successor to the Humanist Manifesto of 1933 (2003)
- Alternatives to the Ten Commandments

== Related organizations ==
- American Atheists
- American Humanist Association
- Brights
- Camp Quest
- Center for Inquiry
- City Congregation for Humanistic Judaism
- Committee for Skeptical Inquiry
- Council of Australian Humanist Societies
- Ethical Culture
- European Humanist Federation
- Federation of Indian Rationalist Associations
- Freedom From Religion Foundation
- Fusion Party
- Giordano Bruno Foundation
- Humanist Canada
- Humanist Association of Ireland
- Humanist Society of New Zealand
- Humanist Society Scotland
- Humanistisch Verbond
- Humanistischer Verband Deutschlands
- Humanists International
- Humanists UK
- Humanists Sweden
- Humanity+
- Institute for Humanist Studies
- Internet Infidels
- Military Association of Atheists and Freethinkers
- National Center for Science Education
- New Zealand Association of Rationalists and Humanists
- Party of Humanists
- Philippine Atheism, Agnosticism, and Secularism Incorporated
- Quackwatch
- Reason Party
- Romanian Secular-Humanist Association
- Sapiens Foundation
- Secular Party of Australia
- Scouting for All
- Secular Student Alliance
- Sidmennt (Iceland)
- The Skeptics Society
- Society for Humanistic Judaism

== See also ==
- Effective altruism – Philosophical and social movement
- Empiricism – Idea that knowledge comes only/mainly from sensory experience
- Epicureanism – Philosophical system
- Eupraxsophy – American philosopher (1925–2012)
- Morality without religion – Aspect of philosophy
- Naturalistic pantheism – Form of pantheism
- Nontheism – Absence of espoused belief in a God or gods
- Rationalist community – Internet community
- Secular religion – Communal belief system without the supernatural
- Secular spirituality – Adherence to spirituality without religious adherence
- Scientific skepticism – Questioning of claims lacking empirical evidence
- Stoicism – Ancient philosophy

=== Wikibooks ===
- Thinking And Moral Problems
- Religions And Their Source
- Purpose
- Developing A Universal Religion four parts of a Wikibook
