= Irreligion in the Republic of Ireland =

The percentage of respondents who said that they had no religion in the census in Ireland in 2011.

Irreligion in Ireland pertains to the population of Ireland that are atheist, agnostic, or otherwise unaffiliated with any religion. The 2022 census recorded that 14% of the population was irreligious; the second largest category after Roman Catholicism. The population was traditionally devoutly Catholic throughout much of Ireland's modern history, with a peak of 94.9% identifying as Catholic in the 1961 census. This percentage has declined to 69% in the 2022 census, the lowest recorded. Conversely, those with no religion made up less than 0.1% of the population in 1961; the proportion grew slowly until the 1991 census where it began to rapidly increase to its current share of 14% of the population in 2022.

Church attendance has also rapidly declined in Ireland. A study by the World Inequality Database (WID) of Irish political and social attitude surveys found that the share of Irish adults who attended church regularly (monthly or more) declined from 80% in the 1990s to 28% in 2020.

In 2012, Ireland ranked in the Top 10 Atheist Populations in a survey which questioned 50,000 people from 57 countries. As of 2018, Ireland was ranked 115th by the International Humanist and Ethical Union in a list of best countries to live in as an atheist.

== History ==
Since its adoption in 1937, the Constitution of Ireland guarantees the right to freedom of religion and freedom of conscience. Article 44 guarantees that the State will not endow or favour any religion and that it will not discriminate on the grounds of religious profession, belief or status.

The aforementioned rights were also enumerated in Article 8 of the Constitution of the Irish Free State which was adopted in 1922. The constitution was subsequently replaced by the current constitution in 1937 following a referendum.

== Statistics ==
=== No religion ===
==== Census ====
Prior to the 2002 census, those who were atheist, agnostic or had no religion simply wrote their non-religious beliefs in a box provided for religion. In 2002, the format changed to the question "What is your religion?" with a list of tick box options, a box for writing in any religion not listed, and a final tick box for "no religion". The religions which had a tick box changed based on the most popular response from the previous census. The chairman of Atheist Ireland, Michael Nugent, and the director of the Humanist Association of Ireland, Terry Flynn, argued that "What is your religion?" is a leading question which presumes a person must have a religion. They further pointed out that the "no religion" tick box was listed last despite being the second most popular category. Following consultation with the Central Statistics Office, the 2022 census religion question was changed to "What is your religion, if any?" and the "No religion" tick box was listed first.

The summary results of the 2022 census were released in May 2023 and indicated that 736,210 people, representing 14% of the usually resident population, had no religion. This was an increase of 63% since the 2016 census and 187% since the 2011 census. Additionally, 942 people identified as "Atheist" and 2,881 as "Agnostic" in the write-in box. There was a decrease in the number of people as well as the proportion of the population who identified as Roman Catholic from 79% in 2016 to 69% in 2022. A more detailed report of census data relating to religion was published by the Central Statistics Office in October 2023. It showed that the number of people with no religion increased across all age cohorts. Among pre-school aged children (0 to 4 years) 16% had no religion and 11% of those in the 5 to 9 age cohort had no religion. The 25-29 age cohort had the highest proportion of people with no religion at 26%.

The 2016 census found that approximately 451,941 people or 10.1% of the population were either atheist, agnostic or had no religion, an increase from approximately 6% as of the 2011 census. The age distribution for those with no religion had an initial low of 4.5% for 12 year olds which rose to a peak of 18.5% for 26 year olds before declining for higher ages down to a final low of 1.1% for those aged 85+. Those with no religion were disproportionally represented in the 20-39 age bracket. Despite containing only 28% of the general population, up to 45% of those with no religion fell into the 20-39 age bracket. Those with no religion made up 17.2% of those aged 20-24; 17.6% of those aged 25-29; 15.6% of those aged 30-34; and 13.7% of those aged 35-39.

The number of irreligious students across all levels of education (namely primary, secondary and third level) increased between the 2011 and 2016 censuses. Third level students were the most irreligious at 21.9% (up from 13.8%); followed by second level students at 7.9% (up from 4.2%) and primary school students at 5.6% (up from 2.9%).

==== Surveys ====
According to a 2012 WIN-Gallup International poll, Ireland had the second highest decline in religiosity from 69% in 2005 to 47% in 2012, while those who considered themselves not a religious person increased from 25% in 2005 to 44% in 2012. The poll also showed that 10% of Ireland now consider themselves convinced atheists, which is a vast increase from 2005. This number is thought to be higher due to citizens describing themselves as "cultural Catholics".

A 2017 Pew Research Center survey found that 15% of the Irish adult population say they are atheist, agnostic or have no particular religion. The following year, in a 2018 survey about certainty of belief, it was shown that 26% of Irish did not believe in God.

2021 WID report (Eurobarometer/ESS/UCD online poll data)
Year(s)	No religion
1973-77	1%
1981-89	3%
1992-97	4%
2002-07	20%
2011-16	28%
2020	27%

A 2021 WID report, based on public opinion surveys by Eurobarometer and the European Social Survey (ESS) between 1973 and 2016, found an increasing proportion of the Irish population had no religion.

The report also included data for 2020 based on survey of an online panel carried out by University College Dublin in cooperation with Ireland Thinks on the day of the 2020 Irish general election which found that 27% of those surveyed had no religion.

An Irish Examiner/Ipsos poll, conducted in August 2024, of 501 respondents weighted to be representative of rural Ireland, asked whether they agreed with the statement: "I would consider myself to be a religious person". The results showed that 24% strongly agreed; 34% somewhat agreed; 14% neither agreed nor disagreed; 16% somewhat disagreed; 10% strongly disagreed; 1% didn’t know; and 1% preferred not to say. There was a strong age disparity with 78% of people aged 65 and over saying they consider themselves religious compared to just 36% of those aged 25–34. The poll had a margin of error of +/- 4%. The sample was designed using electoral divisions with a population size of less than 1,500 people, or "technically rural". According to the survey, "rural" Ireland accounts for 33.4% of the country.

=== Non-belief ===
According to a work by Andrew Greeley in 2003, 5% of those in Ireland did not believe in God, while only 2% accepted the self-identification of "atheist". According to British sociologist Grace Davie, as of 1999, 4% of the Irish did not then believe in God.

A 2010 Bishops Conference survey found that 10.1% of Irish Roman Catholics did not believe in God.

A 2023 survey by Amárach Research, of 1,500 adults throughout Ireland, found that 52% of men and 58% of women said they believed in God.

=== Non-importance of religion ===
In a 2009 Gallup Poll, 46% of adults surveyed in Ireland answered "No" to the question: "Is religion an important part of your daily life?"

A 2013 VitalSigns study by the Community Foundation for Ireland asked Irish respondents to rank a list of 119 areas of society in order of importance. "Religion and spirituality" ranked as the least important thing in Irish people's lives and "[t]he quality of the education system" was the most important.

== Organisations ==
The Humanist Association of Ireland (HAI) and Irish Freethinkers and Humanists represent the non-religious in Ireland, as well as specifically those who identify as humanists. The HAI received the ability to conduct legal marriages in 2012. In 2022, the HAI conducted 9.3% of marriages in Ireland. A further 26.2% of marriages in 2022 were non-religious civil marriages.

Atheist Ireland is a group representing atheists in Ireland. It has advocated for a repeal of blasphemy laws, non-denominational schools, and an end to discrimination against atheists and secular charities.

== See also ==
- Irreligion in Europe
- Irreligion in the United Kingdom
