= Secular coming-of-age ceremony =

Secular ceremonies arranged by organizations

Secular coming-of-age ceremonies, sometimes called civil confirmations, are ceremonies arranged by organizations that are secular, which is to say, not aligned to any religion. Their purpose is to prepare adolescents for their life as adults. Secular coming of age ceremonies originated in the 19th century, when non-religious people wanted a rite of passage comparable to the Christian confirmation. Nowadays, non-religious coming-of-age ceremonies are organized in several European countries; in almost every case these are connected with humanist organisations.

== Czechoslovakia ==
During the communist era, young people were given identity cards at the age of 15 in a collective ceremony. At the age of nineteen, boys were required to perform military service.

== Germany ==
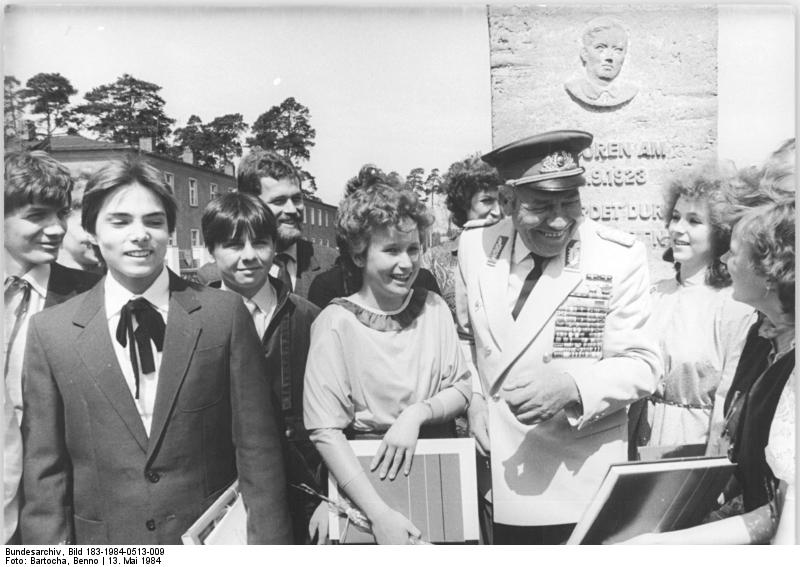
Adolescents in Drögeheide, East Germany celebrating their Jugendweihe with defense minister Heinz Hoffmann, 1984

Modern non-religious coming-of-age ceremonies originate in Germany, where Jugendweihe ("youth consecration", today occasionally known as Jugendfeier, 'youth ceremony') began in the 19th century. The activity was arranged by independent Freethinker organizations until 1954, when the Communist party of East Germany banned it in its old form and changed it to promote Communist ideology. In the GDR Jugendweihe became, with the support of the state, the most popular form of coming-of-age ceremonies for the adolescents, replacing the Christian confirmation. After the reunification of Germany, the Jugendweihe activity regained its independence from Communism, but the non-religious rite of passage had become a tradition, and thus approximately 60-70% of youngsters in the eastern states still participate in it. The age for participating in the Jugendweihe is 13–14 years.

Before the ceremony the youngsters attend specially arranged events or a course, in which they work on topics like history and multiculturalism, culture and creativity, civil rights and duties, nature and technology, professions and getting a job, as well as lifestyles and human relations. Nowadays, there are many different groups organising Jugendweihen, but the most important ones are Jugendweihe Deutschland e. V., der Humanistische Verband Deutschland ('the Humanist Association of Germany'), der Freidenkerverband ('the Freethinker Association') and die Arbeiterwohlfahrt ('the Worker Welfare').

== Nordic countries ==
=== Denmark ===
The first civil confirmation in the Nordic countries was arranged in Copenhagen, Denmark, in 1915 by Foreningen mod Kirkelig Konfirmation ('Association Against Church Confirmation'). In 1924 the organisation changed its name to Foreningen Borgerlig Konfirmation ('The Association for Civil Confirmation').

Civil confirmation declined in the 1970s as central organized ceremonies, but instead they became increasingly more common as private celebrations and the civil confirmations are still common today in atheist families. They are also known as "nonfirmations", but are now rarely linked to any associations.

=== Finland ===
==== Prometheus Camp ====
In Finland, non-religious lower high school students planned a camp for a secular rite of passage as an alternative to the Christian confirmation. The first Prometheus-leiri ('Prometheus Camp') was held in 1989 by the Finnish Philosophy and Life Stance teachers' coalition. The following year Prometheus-leirin tuki ry ('Prometheus Camp Association') was founded for organising the week-long summer camps. The ideology of the association is based on a Humanist world view, but it is politically and religiously non-aligned. One of the main principles of the activity is tolerance towards other peoples' life stances.

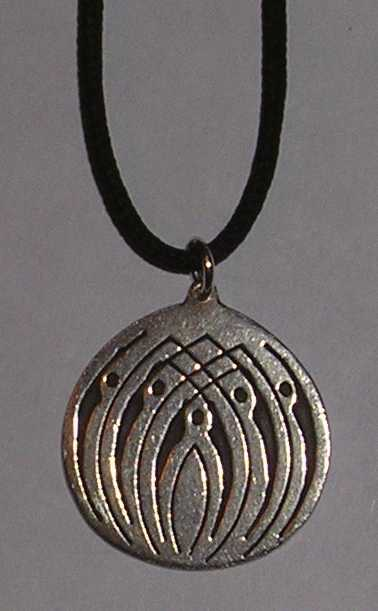
The Prometheus medallion

The camp is primarily aimed at youngsters who do not belong to any religious denomination, but approximately 20% of yearly Prometheus Camp participants are members of some religious community, usually the Evangelical Lutheran Church of Finland, and also participate in a Christian confirmation. The usual age of participants in a Prometheus Camp is 14–15 years, but there are also "senior camps" for older youngsters. In recent years the yearly number of participants has been around 1000, which is approximately 1.5% of the age group.

The themes in the Prometheus Camp are differences, prejudice and discrimination; drugs, alcohol and addiction; society and making a difference in it; the future; world views, ideologies and religions; personal relationships and sexuality; and the environment. These topics are worked on in open discussions, debating, group work, small drama plays or playing games. Every camp is organised and led by a team of seven members: two adults and five youngsters. At the end of the camp, there is a Prometheus Ceremony, in which the participants perform a chronicle about their week for their friends and family. They also get a Prometheus diploma, a silver-coloured Prometheus medallion and a crown of leaves that is bound by the camp leaders. Weekend-long continuation camps are arranged in the autumn. Annually, one Prometheus-camp has been arranged in English, two in Swedish and approximately 65 in Finnish.

=== Iceland ===
In Iceland borgaraleg ferming ('civil confirmations') are organised by Siðmennt, a Humanist association, as an alternative to the Christian confirmation for 14-year-olds. The program started in 1989. Before the civil confirmation, the youngsters take a preparation course about ethics, personal relationships, human rights, equality, critical thinking, relations between the sexes, prevention of substance abuse, skepticism, protecting the environment, getting along with parents, being a teenager in a consumer society, and what it means to be an adult and take responsibility for one's views and behavior. The course consists of 11 weekly group meetings, each lasting 80 minutes. Youngsters living outside Reykjavík can take the course in an intensive two-weekend version. The teachers of the course are usually philosophers. At the end of the course, there is a formal graduation ceremony in which the participants receive diplomas, and some of them perform music, poetry and speeches. There are also prominent members of Icelandic society giving speeches. An increasing number of youngsters have taken the course every year, with 577 taking the course for the confirmation in 2020, which accounts for 13% of the total age group.

=== Norway ===
Human-Etisk Forbund ('The Norwegian Humanist Association') has arranged non-religious confirmation courses in Norway since 1951. During the last ten years, there has been rapid growth in the popularity of the course. In 2006, over 10,500 youngsters, approximately 17% of the age group, chose the humanistisk konfirmasjon or borgerlig konfirmasjon ('civil confirmation'). The course can be taken during the year of one's 15th birthday. Norwegians living abroad can take the course as correspondence course by e-mail.

Humanistforbundet, not to be confused with HEF (Human-Etisk Forbund) has since 2006 arranged an alternative to HEF's confirmation. It is a non-religious civil confirmation based on academics. The program usually consists of several lectures by various prestigious, well-known and competent organisations like the Red Cross, UNICEF and Dyrevernalliansen (a Norwegian animal welfare interest-organisation). People like Thomas Hylland Eriksen have also held lectures.

=== Sweden ===
The association Humanisterna ('The Humanists') started secular coming-of-age courses in Sweden in the 1990s in the form of study circles, but they were soon replaced by a week-long camp where the subjects are dealt with through discussions, games, group works and other activities. In recent years, there have been approximately 100 participants annually in the Humanistisk konfirmation ('Humanist confirmation') camps. The camp's themes concern one's life stance, for example human rights, equality, racism, gender roles, love, sexuality and lifestyles, but the topics under discussion depend on the participating youngsters' own choices. At the end of the camp, there is a festive ceremony in which the participants demonstrate to their families and relatives what they did during the week, e.g. through plays and songs. There are also speeches held by the organisers of the camp, the youngsters themselves, and invited speakers.

== United States and Canada ==
Edifices of the Ethical movement in the United States perform secular coming-of-age ceremonies for 14-year-old members, in which, after spending a year performing community service activities and attending workshops regarding various topics concerning adulthood, the honoree and one's parent(s) speak before the congregation about their growth over the year. Similar ceremonies are performed by congregations of the Unitarian Universalist Association and Canadian Unitarian Council.

== See also ==
- Age of majority
- Coming of Age Day
- Humanist celebrant
