= Humanist Canada =

Non-for-profit organization

- Logo of Humanist Canada
- Formation: 1968
- Type: Not-for-profit
- Legal status: Charity
- Headquarters: Ottawa, ON
- Region served: Canada
- President: Martin Frith
- Affiliations: Humanist International, American Humanist Association
- Website: www.humanistcanada.ca

Humanist Canada (also known as the Humanist Association of Canada, or HAC or HC) is a national not-for-profit charitable organization promoting the separation of religion from public policy and fostering the development of reason, compassion and critical thinking for all Canadians through secular education and community support. Humanist Canada was founded in 1968 and has grown over the past five decades to become Canada's national voice of Humanism. Humanist Canada is an associate member organization of Humanists International. The official symbol of the organization is a modified Happy Human in a red and blue maple leaf.

== History ==
Humanist Canada has its roots in the former Humanist Fellowship of Montreal. This fellowship was an organization of humanists that was founded in 1954 by R. K. Mishra, Ernest Poser, and Maria Jutta Cahn. Bertrand Russell (Lord Russell) and Brock Chisholm were its first patrons.

Humanist Canada's first president was Henry Morgentaler, an activist for women's right to reproductive choice, in 1968. Humanist Canada continues to be involved in social justice issues including reproductive choice, the right to die with dignity, and the preservation of human rights.

=== Authority to perform marriages ===
In 1996, the Marriage Office of the Registrar General of Ontario granted Humanist Canada the authority to certify Humanist Officiants to legally solemnize marriages in Ontario. This was a milestone achievement as Humanist Canada is the first secular organization in Canada to secure the right to have Officiants licensed to perform weddings in Canada. To this end, the organization runs an Officiant training and mentoring program. In addition to training qualified candidates to perform weddings, prospective Officiants are trained how to perform funerals, child namings, and other rites of passage for couples and families who do not want religious aspects in their ceremonies. As of 2021, Humanist Canada has over 75 licensed Officiants.

=== Humanist of the Year ===
Prominent Canadian writers, professors, activists, philosophers, and other Canadians who have made a difference in people's lives, have been honoured with Humanist Canada's "Humanist of the Year" award including:

- June Callwood, founder of Casey House, the world's first hospice for people with HIV/AIDS (2007, posthumous).
- Christopher diCarlo, professor of bioethics and cognitive evolution and creator of the Critical Thinking Solutions consulting firm with school boards to introduce critical thinking skills and programs in high school curriculums.
- Grace MacInnis, a social Canadian politician and the first woman from British Columbia elected to the House of Commons of Canada.
- Marian Sherman, a churchwoman turned atheist in postwar Victoria, BC. She promoted atheism and humanism throughout her community, province, and nation.
- Margaret Atwood, notable Canadian poet, novelist, literary critic, essayist, inventor, teacher, and environmental activist.
- Sue Rodriguez, a Canadian right to die activist.
- Robert Buckman, a doctor of medicine, comedian and author, and was president of Humanist Canada from 1999 to 2004.
- John Ralston Saul, a Canadian writer, political philosopher, and public intellectual.
- Claire Culhane, an activist for prisoner's rights in Canada.
- Joe and Blodwen Piercy, who served the humanist cause faithfully. Pat Duffy Hutcheon, author who contributed to the clarification of the nature and origin of evolutionary naturalism necessary to modern humanism.
- Kurt Vonnegut, author.
- Evelyn Martens, first person to be arrested and found not guilty of assisting others to die in Canada.
- Homa Arjomand, an Iranian political activist, resident in Canada, against the Sharia Court and the Director of Children First Now.
- Henry Morgentaler, pro-choice advocate and first president of Humanist Canada.
- Sue Johansen, a Canadian writer, public speaker, registered nurse, sex educator, and media personality.
- As well as Lloyd Brereton, Larry Pinkus and Ralph Loomer.

Other awards: Robert J. Sawyer, Humanist in the Arts Award, Canadian science fiction writer. Leanne Iskander, Humanist Canada Youth Award, gay-straight alliance crusader.

== Stance and activities ==
Humanist Canada's stated vision is: "To promote the separation of religion from public policy and foster the development of reason, compassion and critical thinking for all Canadians through secular education and community support."

The organization's missions is "A fair and equal society guided by critical thinking and compassion."

Values promoted: "To uphold honesty, reason, critical thinking and cooperation, in every facet of human interdependence. To encourage the efforts of Humanists and Humanism-focused organizations in Canada. To support initiatives and programs that advance Humanism and secularism. To provide secular ceremonies for life events, such as weddings and funerals through our certified Humanist Officiants."

Outreach activities include donations to charitable organizations and causes that advance scientific, academic, medical, and human rights efforts to improve the human condition. Recipients include Casey House ($5,000 donation in 2007) and the Royal Ontario Museum's "Darwin: the Evolution Revolution" exhibit ($50,000 in 2008), and over $62,000 for the Kasese Humanist School in Uganda.

== Governance and management ==
Board of Directors – as of June 2024

- President: Martin Frith
- Vice President: Lee Burton
- Treasurer: Jack Adams
- Director: Louis O'Reilly
- Director: Maureen Bulbrook
- Director: Sassan Sanei
- Director: Desiree Chan
- Director: Alex Howard

== Notable members ==
- Henry Morgentaler (president emeritus), Holocaust survivor, women's reproductive rights activist, humanitarian, and Order of Canada member.
- Robert Buckman (president emeritus), author of several books on improving patient care and morale; a media figure, his television programs included Magic or Medicine? and Human Wildlife, and has acted with the Monty Python comedy troupe.
- Pierre Trudeau, was a board member of the Humanists of Montreal until 1965.

=== Humanist Canada Alliances ===
Affiliations:

- British Columbia Humanist Association
- Grey Bruce Humanists
- Humanist Association of Ottawa
- Humanist Association of Toronto
- Society of Freethinkers (southern Ontario)
- Toronto Oasis
- Ontario Humanist Society

Collaborations:

- Association humaniste du Québec
- Central Ontario Humanist Association
- Comox Valley Humanists
- Halton-Peel Humanist Community
- Humanists, Atheists and Agnostics of Manitoba
- Humanist Association of London
- Secular Humanists in Calgary
- Society of Freethinkers (southern Ontario)
- Thunder Bay Humanists
- Victoria Secular Humanist Association

== Partners ==
- Dying with Dignity
- Secular Connexion Séculière
- Canadian Secular Alliance
- Centre for Inquiry - Canada

=== International ===
- Humanists International
- Humanists UK
- American Humanist Association
- Humanist Association of Germany
- Humanist Association of Ireland
- Humanist Society Scotland
- European Humanist Federation
