= Jugendweihe =

Secular coming of age ceremony practised by German 14-year-olds

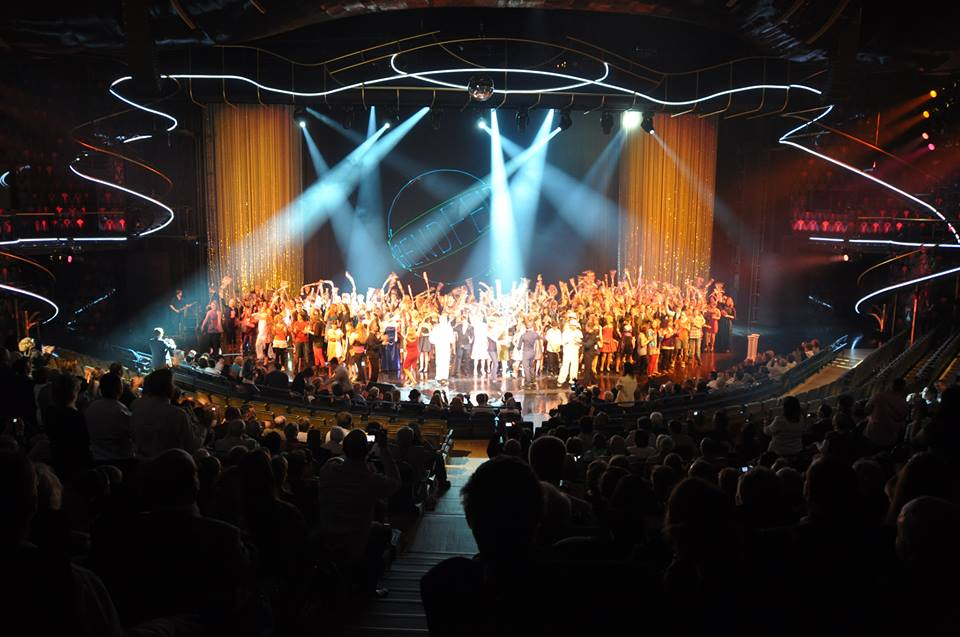
Jugendfeier of the Humanistischer Verband in Berlin 2011

Jugendweihe ("youth consecration") or Jugendfeier ("youth ceremony") is a secular coming of age ceremony for German 14-year-olds. It originated among the secular societies in the 19th century as an alternative to confirmation by the Roman Catholic and Protestant churches, and was especially widespread in East Germany, where state atheism was encouraged under the SED.

== Jugendweihen and Jugendfeiern ==
There are various different groups that organise Jugendweihes in Germany, but the most important ones are the Humanistische Verband Deutschlands ("Humanist Association of Germany"), Jugendweihe Deutschland e. V., and die Arbeiterwohlfahrt ("the Worker Welfare").

Today the term Jugendfeier is increasingly popular since the Humanistischer Verband started to use it instead of Jugendweihe in around the 1980s to mark that participants would not be consecrated but should experience an unforgettable step into adulthood.

Before the ceremony the youngsters can attend specially arranged events and courses, in which they work on topics like history and multiculturalism, culture and creativity, civil rights and duties, nature and technology, professions and getting a job, as well as lifestyles and human relations.

== Origin and history ==
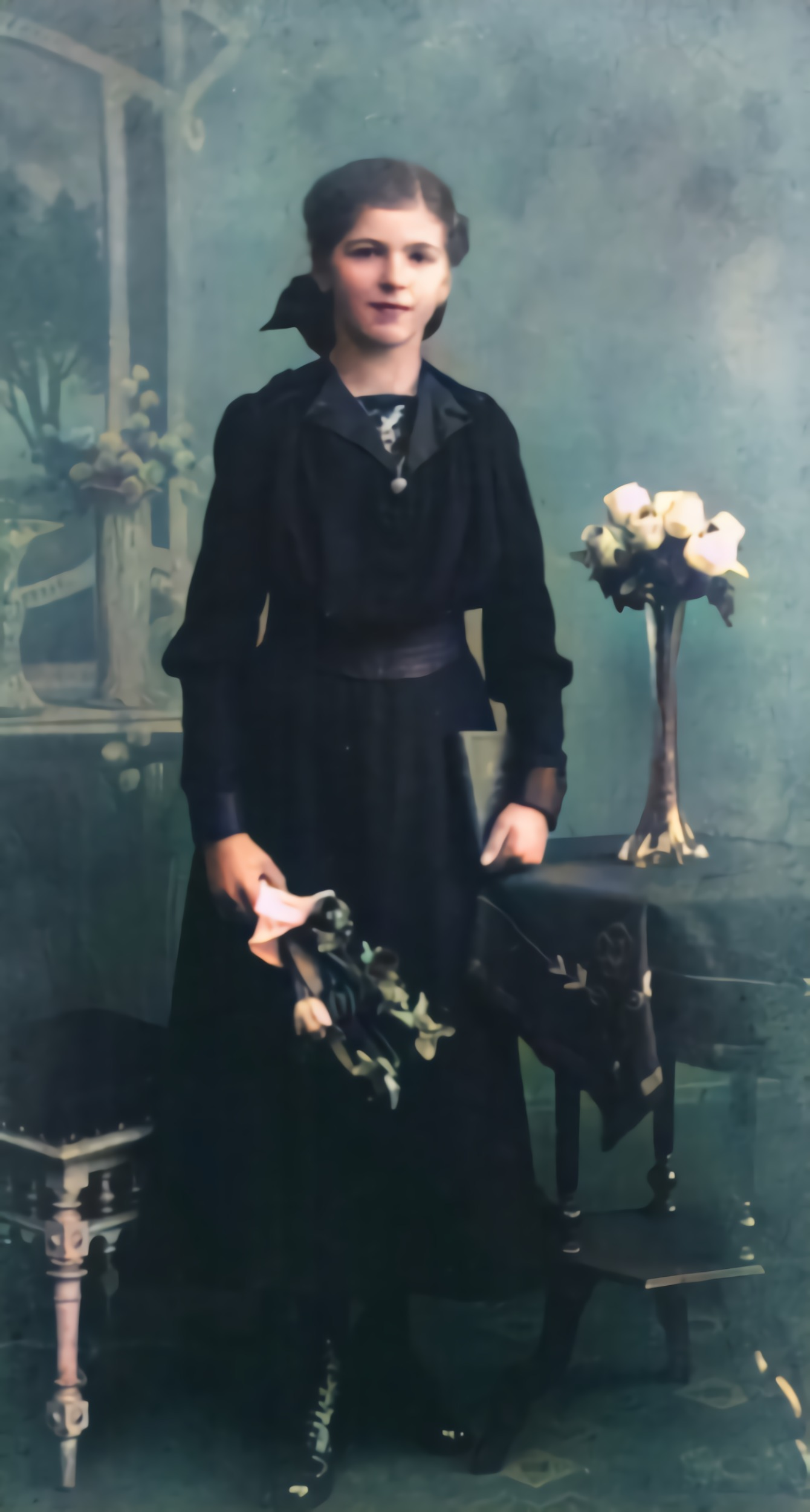
A young woman completing Jugendweihe in Germany around 1900

The term Jugendweihe first appeared in 1852, to mark a new form of initiation developed by the secular movements, who developed a course of moral instruction for their children, founded on cultural history, as an alternative to Christian teachings. The concluding Jugendweihe was above all a ceremony to mark the child's leaving school, and so was held at the age of 14. Since the 1890s the form of the ceremony has remained largely unchanged. The teacher makes a speech about the humanist worldview, the young person makes a pledge, and is given 'pages of remembrance' (Erinnerungsblätter) and a commemorative book. The ceremony is broken up by songs and recitals. This freethinking tradition was absorbed into the labour movement.

=== Repression since 1933 ===
During the era of National Socialism most of the associations that organised Jugendweihen were forbidden, but the Jugendweihe itself was not banned. The Nazi regime tried to establish its own initiation rite for the whole German youth named Nationalsozialistische Jugendleite.

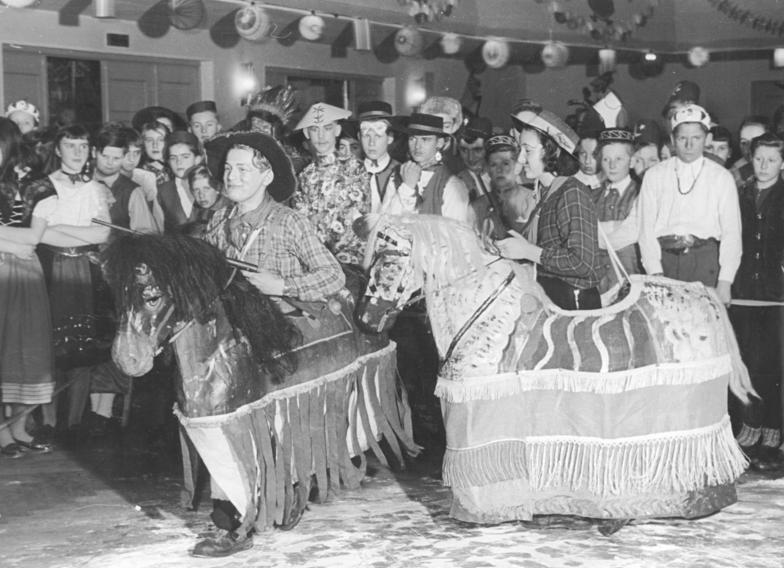
Celebration for Jugendweihe participants in Sonneberg, 1958

=== After the Second World War ===
After the war the secular communities tried to revive the tradition. Jugendweihen were continued by small groups in the freethought tradition, in which many representatives of Party and state took part, and despite frequent proposals, Jugendweihen were not forbidden in the GDR until 1954.

=== Political instrumentalization in East Germany ===
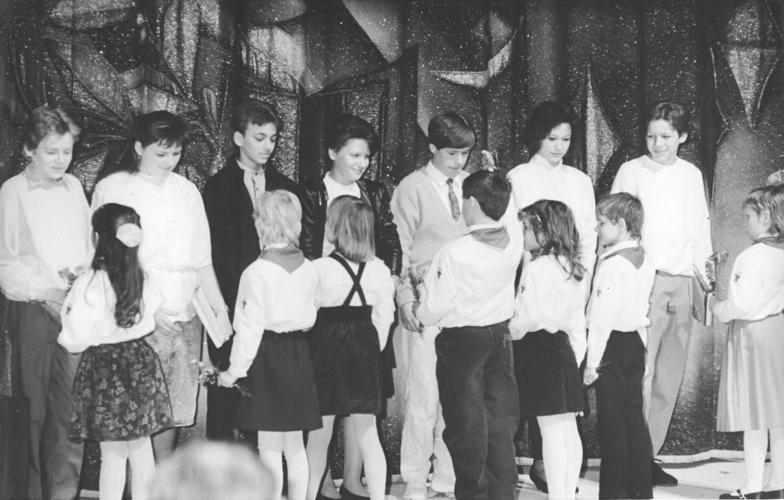
Jugendweihe ceremony in Berlin-Lichtenberg, March 1989

The decision to convert the Jugendweihe into a socialist ceremony was taken in Moscow in May 1953 when the Politburo of the Communist Party of the Soviet Union passed a resolution on "Measures for the Recovery of the Political Situation in the GDR", which suggested a socialist alternative to Christian Confirmation. Under heavy Soviet pressure the ceremonies were established alongside confirmation. Even young people with a denominational commitment were expected to take part in the Jugendweihe ceremonies; those who did not take part would have to contend with significant disadvantages and repression. The first Jugendweihe took place in East Berlin on 27 March 1955, at which the 14-year-olds were inducted into adulthood and received their identity papers. After the ceremony had taken place they would be addressed with the formal pronoun Sie (as opposed to the informal du).

For a year before the actual Jugendweihen, "youth courses" were held, which mostly consisted of visits to workplaces, lectures on sexuality and politics, balls or similar social pursuits.

All participants were invited to the ceremony, which usually took place in a local hall or theatre. After an official speech and the pledge to the socialist State, most were presented with flowers by the Young Pioneers. Until 1974 the state gave every young adolescent the book Weltall Erde Mensch (Universe, Earth, Man), which contained general knowledge in addition to propagandistic sayings. After 1974 everyone received the purely propagandistic book Der Sozialismus - Deine Welt (Socialism - Your World) and in the last years of the GDR the book Vom Sinn unseres Lebens (Of the Meaning of Our Lives) was given. There was also a certificate. After the public ceremony, most of the rest of the day was spent with one's family and classmates.

In every East German Jugendweihe the young people would dedicate themselves to the ideals of the state. The pledge was altered five times by the Central Committee throughout its history. The general format of each pledge was the same; the opening, the question of "Are you prepared..?" and the response of "Yes, we pledge!" remained unchanged in each version. As time went past, however, the language of the pledge became ever more overtly patriotic and revolutionary. The first and second alterations of the pledge, made in 1955 and 1956, only made fairly minor changes in wording. The 1958 pledge, however, explicitly required young people to swear to the "great and noble cause of socialism", and to defend peace with the Soviet people, though also with "all peace-loving people in the world". The fourth alteration of the pledge, made on 21 November 1968, was even more revolutionary in tone; it dropped general references such as that to "all peace-loving people", and asked young people to "defend socialism against every imperialist attack". It accepted young people into a community "under the direction of the working class and its revolutionary Party". The final alteration, in 1985 (four years before the fall of the Berlin Wall), was minor in comparison, adding a paragraph in which the attendants pledged to respect and help one another, and extending the closing address, emphasising the "heavy responsibility" conferred on the newly come-of-age.
