= David Pollock (humanist) =

British humanist (1942–2023)

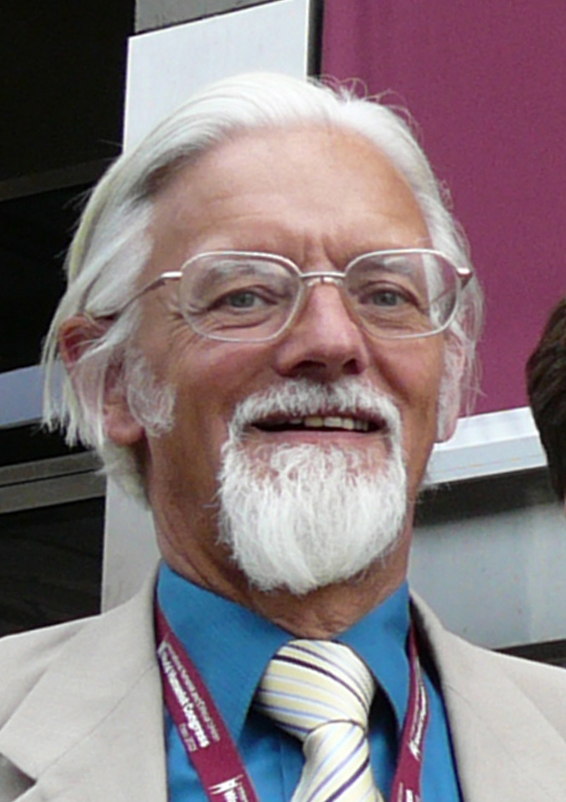
- Pollock in 2011
- Born: 3 February 1942
- Died: 12 May 2023 (aged 81)
- Occupation: President of the European Humanist Federation
- Years active: 1961–2023
- Known for: Humanist campaigning; historical archives; instigating the All-Party Parliamentary Humanist Group

David Pollock (3 February 1942 – 12 May 2023) was a British humanist who served as President of the European Humanist Federation (EHF). He was also treasurer of the Education and Health Trust Uganda.

== Life and career ==
Pollock was born on 3 February 1942. He became involved in 1961 with the humanist group at Oxford University, where he studied Classics. He later worked in management in the National Coal Board, before becoming Director of Action on Smoking and Health between 1991 and 1995, and then of the Continence Foundation, between 1996 and 2001. His research while at ASH led to his writing "Denial & Delay: The Political History of Smoking and Health, 1951–1964" (ASH, 1999 - ISBN 1 872428 44 4).

Pollock was a trustee of the British Humanist Association (BHA - now Humanists UK) between 1965 and 1975 (chair from 1970 to 1972) and again from 1997 to November 2021. He was a former board member (1979–2018; chair 1989–1991) of the Rationalist Association, publisher of New Humanist magazine.

Pollock was President of the European Humanist Federation between 2006 and 2012, where he campaigned for secularism, human rights and equality within European and international institutions. He represented the International Humanist and Ethical Union (now Humanists International) at the Council of Europe from 2012 to 2017. He received the Distinguished Service to Humanism Award from Humanists International in 2011.

His particular interest was in the law and religion and belief, especially the clash between laws on equality and non-discrimination and the human right to manifest a religion or belief. As EHF President he took part in the consultations of the EU-funded Religare project and wrote a substantial paper for them and contributed a critical review to the book in which their report was published. He gave evidence to the Commission on Religion and Belief in British Public Life and was one of a group chaired by Rowan Williams convened by the Equality and Human Rights Commission that met in 2014-15 to consider the law on religion and belief and contribute thereby to the EHRC’s 2016 report "Religion or belief: is the law working?" He addressed the International Consortium for Law and Religion Studies (ICLARS) conference in Oxford in 2016 on whether there is or should be a right to freedom from religion. He has also written on charity law in relation to religion and belief.

In 2021 he published privately a collection of his writing under the title "Thinking about Humanism".

Pollock died from cancer on 12 May 2023, at the age of 81.
