= Dan Larhammar =

Swedish academic (born 1956)

- Born: April 1, 1956 (age 69)
- Education: Medical Science
- Alma mater: Uppsala University Sweden
- Occupation: Molecular biologist
- Employer: Professor at Uppsala University Department of Neuroscience
- Known for: Criticism of alternative medicine
- Awards: Hedenius Award (2000), Pharmacist of the Year (2016), His Majesty the King's 12th size gold medal (2022), Order of the Rising Sun, Gold and Silver Star (2022)
- Website: https://www.neuro.uu.se/research/research-groups/dan-larhammar/

Dan Larhammar (born April 1, 1956) is a Swedish academic professor in molecular cell biology at Uppsala University. His research concerns evolution, neurobiology, endocrinology and pharmacology. As of 2021 Larhammar leads a research team at Uppsala that studies receptors for brain neurotransmitters and uses zebrafish as a model species to investigate the localization and functions of memory proteins. Larhammar also serves as President of the Royal Swedish Academy of Sciences since 2018 and is a skepticism activist.

== Education ==
Larhammar received his pharmacist degree in 1980 and a PhD in medical science at Uppsala University in 1984.

== Career ==
Since 1994 Larhammar has been a professor of molecular biology at Uppsala University where he has supervised 22 students to a PhD degree. His research focuses on three lines of research: clarifying the evolution of the mechanisms for long-term memory, resolving the evolution important gene families in vertebrates, and investigating G protein-coupled receptors which make them bind to and respond to, or reject, certain ligands. Using zebrafish, Larhammar explores the localization and functions of the memory proteins. His team works on discovering at what point new functions rose and how they have changed over the course of evolution, especially in gene families that include neuropeptides, G-protein-coupled receptors, ion channels, and genes involved in vision.

In 2007, Larhammar was elected member of the Royal Swedish Academy of Sciences and serves as its president since 2018. He was the chairman of the Swedish Skeptics' Association 1998–2004. As a critic of pseudoscience, he has mostly examined alternative medicine and creationism.

In 2022, he was elected a member of the Academia Europaea.

== Activism ==
Larhammar is a skeptic of pseudoscience, creationism and alternative medicine. In an issue of Skeptical Inquirer Larhammar addresses an article written by a creationist, Dmitrii A. Kuznetsov, attempting to disprove evolution by isolating mRNA from three species of voles. Each vole species was found to have a substance that blocked the production of protein from the other two species' mRNA production of protein, but did not block its own species' mRNA. The inhibiting substance however did not prevent protein synthesis of two distantly related mRNAs. Larhammar looked into the study and found that several sources and journals listed in the study did not exist. Larhammar also criticizes the lack of qualitative data of the experiments, relying only on quantitative results.

In an interview with Linda Givetash, Larhammar criticizes the herbal remedies for COVID-19 pushed by China. Larhammar addresses studies from Chinese and Japanese journals that support herbal remedies do not have adequate sample sizes, use vague terms and nonpharmacological concepts, or to be testing too many combinations of herbs to parse out their specific effects.

During another interview at the European Academics Science Advisory Council, Larhammar discusses the harm alternative medicine can have, especially during a pandemic. He states people may rely on non-working methods in lieu of seeking professional help with methods backed by evidence. Furthermore, these people will think they are protected, in turn causing them to take greater risks exposing themselves and others to the virus. This, Larhammar says, can lead those people into false beliefs that the disease is not as severe as it really is.

Larhammar was during 2020-2021 the chairperson of a committee of experts appointed by ALLEA, the European Federation of Academies of Sciences and Humanities , that wrote a discussion paper with the title "Fact or Fake? Tackling Science Disinformation". The report summarizes research on the spread of disinformation, especially the psychology behind it. Focusing on disinformation on climate change, vaccines and covid-19, the report describe strategies to limit the harm, especially careful checking of facts and sources, and recommends coordination of efforts to achieve this.

== Awards ==
Larhammar has also appeared as a critic of religion, and in 2000 he was the first receiver of the Hedenius Award given by the Swedish Humanist Association with the motivation that he has "with sharpness and pathos defended scientific knowledge, rationalism and humanism".

Larhammar together with Prof. Leif Andersson Leif Andersson (animal geneticist) was awarded the Linnaeus Prize in Zoology 2004 by the Royal Physiographic Society in Lund.

In 2016 Larhammar received the Pharmacist of the Year award, given by Pharmacists of Sweden. The award is given to a pharmacist active in Sweden who, through his or her work within practical pharmacy, has contributed to strengthen, develop or consolidate the role of pharmacy within society.

On January 28, 2022, Larhammar was awarded His Majesty the King's 12th size gold medal worn around the neck on the Order of the Seraphim ribbon "for meritorious contributions within the Swedish academic system."

November 3, 2022 the Government of Japan announced the foreign recipients of the 2022 Autumn Conferment of Japanese Decoration. Larhammar was awarded The Order of the Rising Sun, Gold and Silver Star for his "contribution to the promotion of academic exchanges and mutual understanding between Japan and Sweden."

== Gallery ==
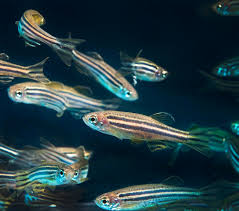
