= Edinburgh Secular Society =

Successor to the 19th century society

Edinburgh Secular Society is an organisation, based in Edinburgh, dedicated to promoting secularism across Scotland; it was established on 28 October 2012.

An earlier society of this name was active in the mid-19th century. The earlier Edinburgh Secular Society was active in 1866–89, 1891–94, 1896–1903, 1906–09 ). In historical documents, it is often referred to as the Edinburgh 'branch' of the National Secular Society. It is believed they met in Trades Hall, Carruther's Close (now Carrubber's Close), Edinburgh. An 1857 notice in The Reasoner lists their weekly meetings on Sundays at 6.30pm. They appear to have been ejected by the Christian 'Carrubber's Close Mission' in 1859. John MacKinnon Robertson was active in Edinburgh Secular Society, Bradlaugh addressed Edinburgh Secular Society, and Robertson also gave addresses at the Leicester Secular Society (the first secular society in the world, formed in 1851), led by George Holyoake, who introduced the term ‘secularism’ in 1851. John Lees took over as president of Edinburgh Secular Society, and later vice-president of the NSS.

In 2013 the group, along with the Humanist Society Scotland, started a campaign against religious representation on council education committees in Scotland.

In August 2013, Edinburgh Secular Society published a report which outlined the extent of religious indoctrination in Scottish schools, by large chaplaincy teams.
