= Union of Rationalist Atheists and Agnostics =

Unione degli Atei e degli Agnostici Razionalisti
- Abbreviation: UAAR
- Formation: 18 March 1991
- Type: APS
- Location: Rome, Italy
- Region served: Italy
- Official language: Italian
- General Secretary: Roberto Grendene
- Affiliations: European Humanist Federation; Humanists International
- Website: www.uaar.it

The Union of Rationalist Atheists and Agnostics (Unione degli Atei e degli Agnostici Razionalisti, UAAR) is the only nationwide association of atheists and agnostics in Italy. It is independent from political parties or lobbies and numbers around 3,000 members.

Its logo references the Happy Human symbol, in common with other humanist organisations.

== History ==
UAAR was founded in 1986 to promote the diffusion of atheist and agnostic ideas, campaign for a thoroughly secular state, and struggle against any privilege granted to the Roman Catholic religion and against any discrimination of nonbelievers.

== Activity ==
Between December 1996 and July 2019, UAAR regularly published a bi-monthly magazine, L'Ateo (The Atheist). In January 2020 it started publishing a new bi-monthly magazine, Nessun Dogma.

Besides seeking contacts with government representatives, UAAR is prepared to initiate legal actions to obtain the full acknowledgement for atheism and atheists' rights. They have, for instance, obtained recognition of the right for those baptised as infants to be considered no longer Catholic if they wish.

The UAAR has held Debaptism Day and Darwin Day annually.

The UAAR has pushed for the removal of crucifixes in the classrooms of state-run schools, a position which was upheld by the European Court of Human Rights in Strasbourg in November 2009. In 2014 and 2015 The UAAR condemned rulings against teachers who removed crucifixes.

In 2009 the association funded research to see if the Shroud of Turin could be reproduced.

In 2010 the association campaigned for stricter regulation of when church bells in Pisa were allowed to ring.

The UAAR has been campaigning against Italy's blasphemy laws since at least 2017. In 2019 the UAAR condemned a ruling which charged an Italian photographer with blasphemy for comparing the Catholic Church to a masochist club during a radio interview.

UAAR is a member of the Humanists International (HI) and European Humanist Federation (EHF), and collaborates with other humanist organisations on international issues.

Among UAAR's main goals is the abrogation of article 7 of the Italian Constitution, which recognises the Lateran Treaties between Italy and Vatican City.

The UAAR has also challenged the Catholic Church on issues such as abortion.

=== The Atheist Bus Campaign ===
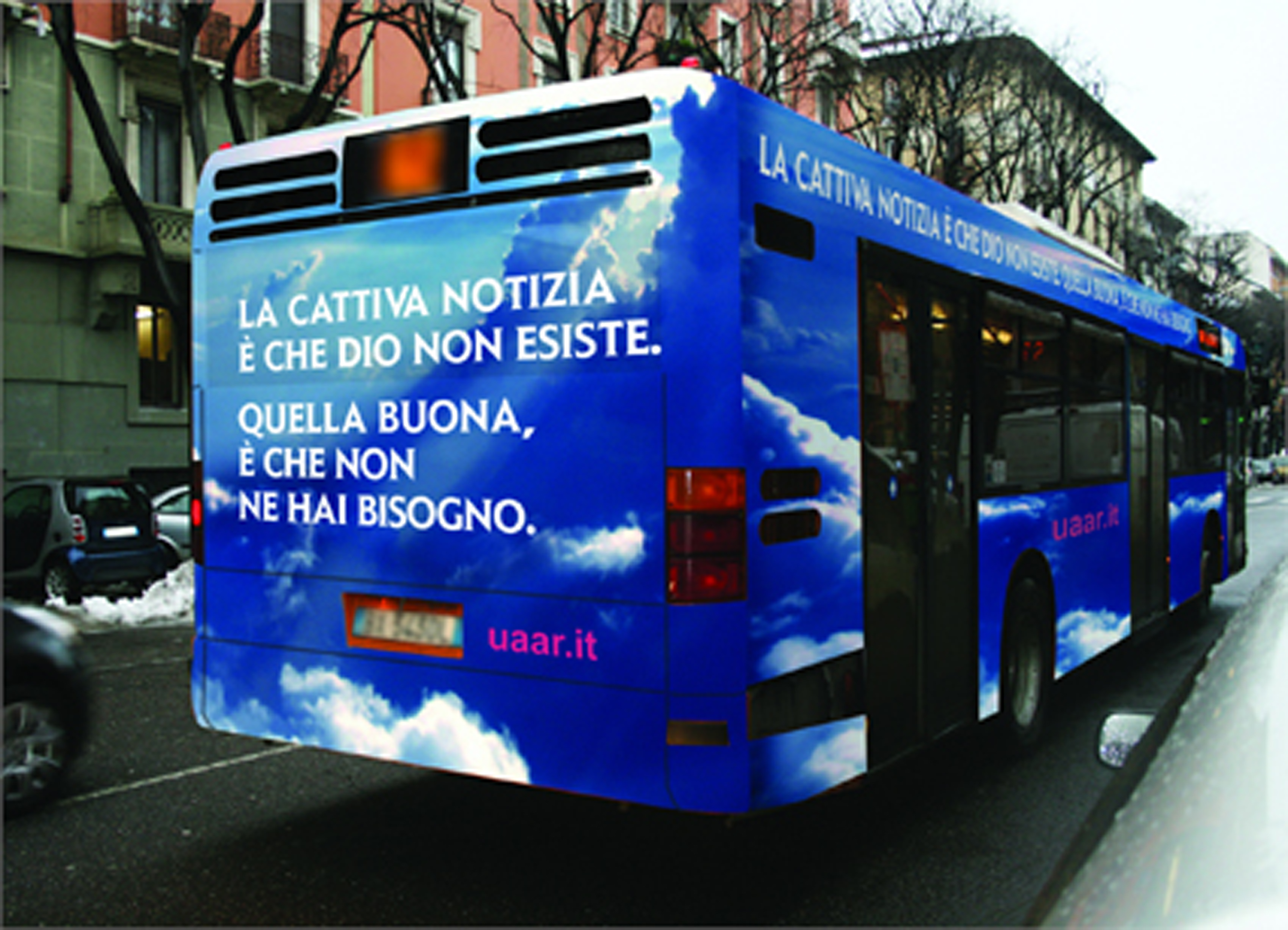
The original Italian Atheist Bus ad.: "The bad news is that God does not exist. The good news is that you don't need it"

In January 2009, the organisation promoted an atheist bus campaign inspired by the similar initiative of the British Humanist Association. The campaign, due to start on 4 February 2009, was symbolically launched in Genoa, on the occasion of the nomination of the city's archbishop, Cardinal Angelo Bagnasco, as president of the Italian Episcopal Conference (CEI).

The original slogan chosen for the Italian campaign read: "The bad news is that God does not exist. The good news is that you don't need it". On 16 January 2009 IGPDecaux, the company holding licenses for ads on public transport in Genoa, refused to give authorization to the atheist bus campaign on the grounds that it may "offend the moral, civic and religious convictions of the public". The UAAR changed the slogan for the campaign to "The good news is that Zeus doesn’t exist. The bad news is that you can only say this about Zeus", but this slogan was also rejected due to the design including “UAAR, free not to believe in God”.

Antonio Catricalà, the then head of the Italian National Authority for Fair Trading and Competition, announced that the Authority filed a case against the Atheist Bus initiative because of the potentially "dangerous and mendacious nature" of the ads. As a reaction, the UAAR launched a new campaign in Genoa with a different slogan to comply with the advertising authority's rules: "The good news is that there are millions of atheists in Italy. The excellent news is they believe in freedom of speech".

Subsequently, the UAAR also ran newspaper ads containing the original slogan.
