= Homa Arjomand =

Iranian campaigner

Homa Arjomand (2018)

Homa Arjomand (born 1952) is an Iranian political activist, resident in Canada. She is a member of the International Campaign against the Sharia Court and the Director of Children First Now.

She received the "Humanist of the Year" award from Humanist Canada's Toronto chapter in 2005.
