= European Humanist Federation =

Defunct umbrella organization

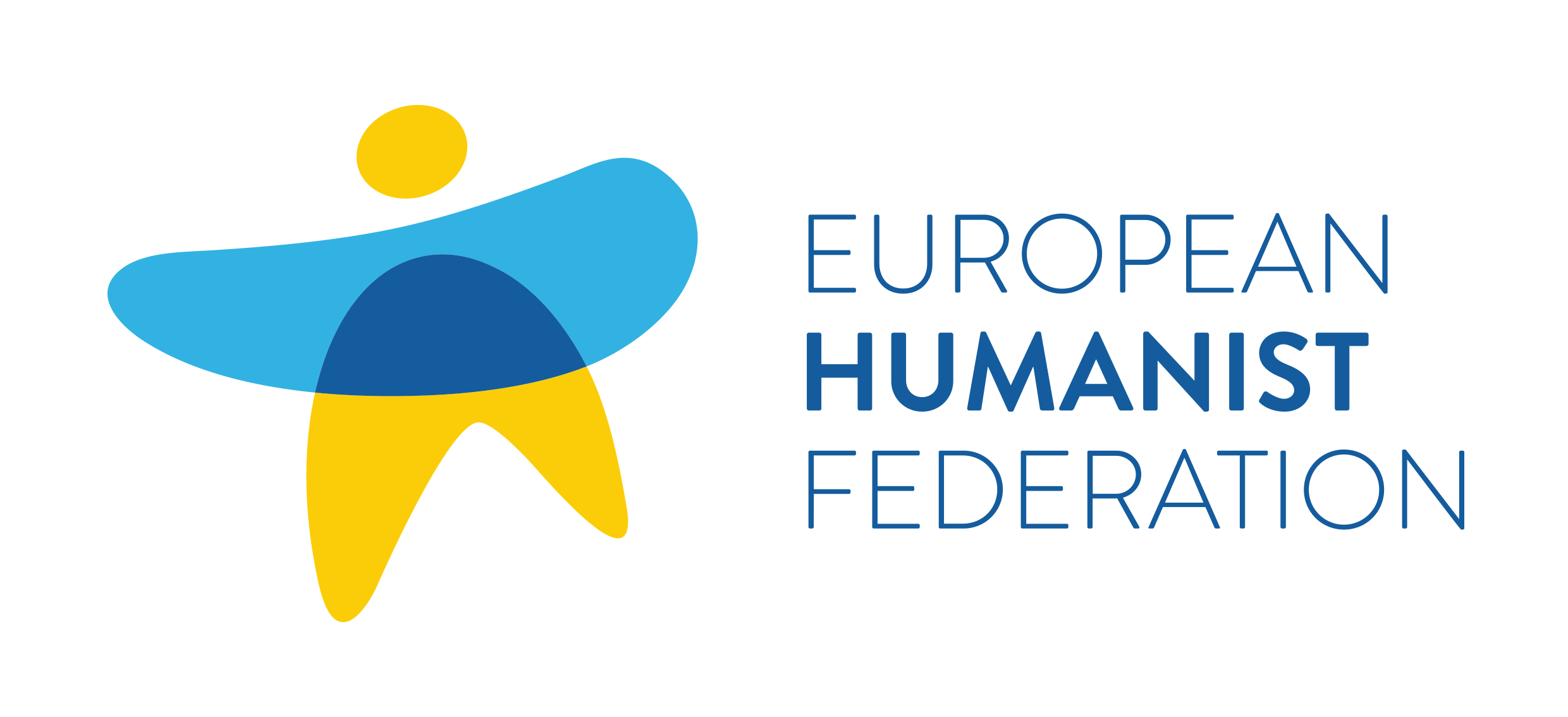
- Successor: Humanists International European Policy Forum
- Formation: 1991; 35 years ago
- Dissolved: 18 December 2022
- Location: Brussels, Belgium
- Official language: English, French
- Key people: Michael Bauer (last President), David Pollock
- Website: humanistfederation.eu

The European Humanist Federation (EHF, French: Fédération Humaniste Européenne, FHE), officially abbreviated as EHF-FHE, was an umbrella of more than 60 humanist and secularist organisations from 25 European countries.

Founded in Prague in July 1991, the EHF was based in Brussels, where it employed a small team of staff focused on European Union policy advocacy and capacity-building in European humanist organisations. Its advocacy activities are primarily focused on the European Parliament, European Commission, and other bodies associated with the European Union and Council of Europe, as part of its mission to promote a humanist vision of Europe. It was the largest umbrella organisation of humanist associations in Europe, promoting a secular Europe, defending equal treatment of everyone regardless of religion or belief, and fighting religious conservatism and privilege in Europe and at the European Union level. It closely collaborated with alongside Humanists International for much of its existence. When it dissolved in 2022, its activities had largely been taken over by Humanists International.

The EHF was the parent body of the European Humanist Professionals (EHP), which networks humanist celebrants, humanist pastoral carers, school speakers and educators, and the staff of the various European humanist associations into one professional body, focused on building best practice and expanding the availability of humanist charitable services across Europe. This work became part of Humanists International's European Capacity Building and Networking Project, which was from 2024 transformed to the European Humanist Services Network (EHSN).

== Goals ==
The EHF promotes a secular state and opposes lobbying by religious organisations towards European institutions. The EHF aims to:

- Achieve separation between religion and the state throughout Europe;
- Defend freedom of religion and belief, which includes the right not to believe and the right to change one's belief;
- Defend freedom of thought and speech, which implies opposition to laws prohibiting "blasphemy";
- Promote non-discrimination on all grounds (ethnic or national origin, religion and belief, disability, age, gender, sexual orientation, etc.), inspired by the EHF's humanistic conviction that all men and women are born free and equal;
- Support women's sexual and reproductive health and rights when and where they are threatened.

== Actions ==
The EHF was recognised as an official partner of the European Union (EU) under Article 17 of the Treaty on the Functioning of the European Union (TFEU). It is therefore regularly invited to meet the Presidents of the Commission, the European Parliament and the European Council. The EHF also participates in meetings of the European Parliament Platform for Secularism in Politics (EPPSP). At the EU level, it also works with the European External Action Service (EEAS) and the European Union Agency for Fundamental Rights (FRA), whilst also collaborating with the Council of Europe and the Organization for Security and Co-operation in Europe (OSCE).

=== Examples of EHF campaigns ===
- Sexual and Reproductive Rights ARE Human Rights
- EU Guidelines on Freedom of Religion and Beliefs: Securing a Balanced and Secular Approach
- Keep Dogma Out of European Research
- Opposing Tonio Borg's nomination at European Commission
- No to Special Rights for Churches in the EU

The EHF also supports its 63 member organisations in the challenges they are facing at a domestic level and works in partnership with a large network of associations – including progressive religious organisations – with whom it shared goals and interests, in order to oppose conservative religious lobbies across Europe.

=== A Vision for Europe and the Brussels Declaration ===
As the centrepiece of their campaign A Vision for Europe, that strove to uphold secularism within the EU, the EHF, the IHEU and Catholics for Choice (endorsed by the EPPSP) jointly presented the "Brussels Declaration" on 27 February 2007 in the European Parliament, and also addressed to the 27 EU heads of government. It was widely supported by European politicians (signed by more than 80 MEPs), academics, scientists, Nobel Prize winners, writers and journalists. The Brussels Declaration was a response to the would-be Berlin Declaration, which, being negotiated at the time and set to become the preamble to the amended EU Constitution, contained references to God and the supposed "Christian roots of Europe". Eventually these references were left out, and a strong emphasis on individual rights and dignity included, much to the relief of David Pollock (former EHF president), Sophie in 't Veld (EPPSP chairwoman) and Roy W. Brown (former IHEU president), the last of whom called it "a victory for Secularism in Europe".

== Members ==
The following list contains all member organisations of the EHF (as of 2014).
Note: Official English names of organisations are given priority. Organisations that lack an official English name have been translated as literally as possible whilst retaining their intended meaning and complying with English grammar and conventions.

English name / local name (abbreviation)	Founded	Region served	Notes
Alliance of Humanists, Atheists and Agnostics Luxembourg / Allianz vun Humanisten, Atheisten an Agnostiker Lëtzebuerg (AHA)	2010	Luxembourg	
Association of Freethought "Giordano Bruno" / Associazione del Libero Pensiero "Giordano Bruno"	1906	Italy	
Atheist Union of Greece / Ένωση Αθέων (Énosi Atheon)	2010	Greece	
British Humanist Association (BHA)	1896	United Kingdom	
Center for Civil Courage / Centar za građansku hrabrost (Hrabrost)	2011	Croatia	
Center for Inquiry Romania / Fundatia Centrul pentru Conştiinţă Critică (CCC)	2007	Romania	Romanian Center for Inquiry branch
Central London Humanists (CLH)	2007	United Kingdom	
Centre for Secular Action / Centre d’Action laïque (CAL)	1969	Belgium	
Conway Hall Ethical Society	1787	United Kingdom	
Council for Inspection and Guidance non-confessional Ethics / Raad voor Inspectie en Begeleiding niet-confessionele Zedenleer (RIBZ)	1993	Belgium	Executive agency of the Flemish Government
Danish Atheist Society / Ateistisk Selskab	2002	Denmark	
EQUAL Equality Secularity Europe / EGALE Egalité Laïcité Europe (EGALE)	2004	France	
ETHOS – Ethics Tolerance Humanism Citizenship Secularism / ETHOS – Etika Tolerancia Humanizmus Občianstvo Sekularizmus (ETHOS)	2013	Slovakia	Member since 2014.
Europe and Secularity Movement / Mouvement Europe et Laïcité	1954	France	
European Humanist Professionals (EHP)	1994	Europe	
Francesc Ferrer i Guàrdia Foundation / Fundació Francesc Ferrer i Guàrdia / Fundación Francisco Ferrer Guardia	1987	Spain	
Freethinkers Association of Switzerland / Freidenker-Vereinigung der Schweiz (FVS/ASLP/FAS)	1908	Switzerland	
Freethinkers League of Austria / Freidenkerbund Österreichs	1887	Austria	
Freethinkers Union / Vapaa-ajattelijain liitto ry	1945	Finland	Finnish umbrella organisation
Galha LGBT Humanists (Galha)	1979	United Kingdom	Based in the UK, internationally active.
Gaston-Crémieux Circle / Cercle Gaston-Crémieux	1967	France	Non-Zionist Jewish secularists
Giordano Bruno Foundation / Giordano-Bruno-Stiftung (gbs)	2004	Germany	
Good Sense / Здравомыслие (Zdravomyslie)	2010	Russia	
HSHB Foundation / Stichting HSHB	1960	Netherlands	
Humanist Association of Ireland (HAI)	1993	Ireland	
Humanist Cultural Education / Humanistisch Vormingsonderwijs	1980	Netherlands	Executive agency of the Dutch Government
Humanist Federation / Humanistisk Samfund	2008	Denmark	Danish umbrella organisation
Humanist Historical Centre / Humanistisch Historisch Centrum (HHC)	1996	Netherlands	
Humanist League / Humanistisch Verbond (HV)	1946	Netherlands	
Humanist Association of Germany / Humanistischer Verband Deutschlands (HVD)	1993	Germany	German umbrella organisation
Humanist Society Scotland (HSS)	1989	Scotland	
Humanist Union of Greece / Ένωση Ουμανιστών/-τριών Ελλάδας (Énosi Oumanistón/-trión Elládas) (ΕΝΩ.ΟΥΜ.Ε)	2010	Greece	
Humanist-Liberal Association / Humanistisch-Vrijzinnige Vereniging (HVV)	1951	Belgium	
Humanists UK (Humanists UK)	1896	United Kingdom	Formerly known as the British Humanist Association.
Icelandic Ethical Humanist Association / Siðmennt, félag siðrænna húmanista á Íslandi (Siðmennt)	1990	Iceland	
League of Education / La Ligue de l’enseignement (La Ligue)	1866	France	French educational umbrella organisation
League of Freely Religious Communities of Germany / Bund Freireligiöser Gemeinden Deutschlands (BFGD)	1859	Germany	German umbrella organisation
Liberal Study, Archive and Documentation Centre "Karel Cuypers" / Vrijzinnig Studie-, Archief- en Documentatiecentrum "Karel Cuypers" (VSAD)	1986	Belgium	
Malta Humanist Association (MHA)	2010	Malta	
National Coordination of Councils for the Secularity of Institutions / Coordinamento Nazionale delle Consulte per la Laicità delle Istituzioni	2005	Italy	Italian umbrella organisation
National Secular Society (NSS)	1866	United Kingdom	
North East Humanists (NEH)	1957	United Kingdom	
Norwegian Humanist Association / Human-Etisk Forbund (HEF)	1956	Norway	
Polish Humanist Association "Sapere Aude" / Towarzystwa Humanistycznego "Sapere Aude" (PHA)	1991	Poland	Polish Center for Inquiry branch
Prometheus Society / Spoločnosť Prometheus	1990	Slovakia	
Rationalist Union / Union Rationaliste (UR)	1930	France	
Romanian Humanist Association / Asociaţia Umanistă Română (AUR)	2008	Romania	
Romanian Secular-Humanist Association / Asociaţia Secular-Umanistă din România (ASUR)	2010	Romania	
Russian Humanist Society / Российское гуманистическое общество (Rossíjskoje gumanístičeskoje óbščestvo) (РГО/RGO)	1995	Russia	
Secular Europe / Europa Laica (EL)	2001	Spain	
Secular Humanism Portugal / Humanismo Secular Portugal (HSP)	2009	Portugal	
South West London Humanists (SWL Humanists)	2009	United Kingdom	
Swedish Humanist Association / Humanisterna (SHA)	1979	Sweden	
Umbrella Organisation of Free Worldview Communities / Dachverband Freier Weltanschauungsgemeinschaften (DFW)	1949	Germany	German umbrella organisation
Union Liberal Associations / Unie Vrijzinnige Verenigingen (UVV)	1966	Belgium	Flemish umbrella organisation
Union of Rationalist Atheists and Agnostics / Unione degli Atei e degli Agnostici Razionalisti (UAAR)	1986	Italy	
Union of Secular Families / Union des Familles Laïques (UFAL)	1988	France	

== See also ==
- List of secularist organizations
