= Romanian Secular-Humanist Association =

Organization

- Abbreviation: ASUR
- Formation: 2010
- Type: Non-profit
- Purpose: Promote secular humanist values in Romania.
- Location: Bucharest, Romania
- Key people: Toma Pătrașcu (President); Anca Bontas (Vice-President); Vlad Nistor (Vice-President); Monica Belițoiu (Executive Director)
- Website: www.asur.ro

The Romanian Secular-Humanist Association (Romanian: Asociația Secular-Umanistă din România, abbreviated as ASUR) is a non-governmental organization established in March 2010 to promote secular humanist values in Romania. The organization's activities include fighting religious indoctrination in schools and the state financing of churches.

Since 2012, ASUR also organizes the annual Conferința Raționalilor (Rational's Conference) and it was one of the partner organizations responsible for the Bucharest Science Festival in 2013 and 2014 and the Humanist Eastern European Conference in 2015. The organization is a member of the European Humanist Federation and as of October 2011 of the International Humanist and Ethical Union.
