= Humanist Association of Ireland =

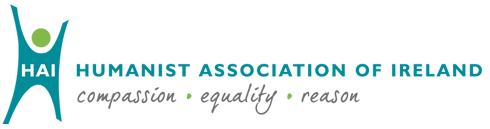
HAI logo.

The Humanist Association of Ireland (HAI) is an Irish secular humanist organisation that was founded in 1993 to promote humanism, which they describe as:

an ethical philosophy of life, based on a concern for humanity in general, and for human individuals in particular. This view of life combines reason with compassion. It is for those people who base their interpretation of existence on the evidence of the natural world and its evolution, and not on belief in supernatural power.

It hosts an annual lecture, usually at Trinity College Dublin, to mark Darwin Day and holds regular public meetings.

The HAI is also active in providing Humanist alternatives to traditional wedding, baptism and funeral ceremonies.

The HAI is a member organisation of the European Humanist Federation and is affiliated with the International Humanist and Ethical Union (IHEU). The official symbol of the HAI is the Happy Human.

Owen Sheehy-Skeffington, son of Francis Sheehy-Skeffington, helped to set up the organisation.

In April 2009, the Association started an advertising campaign on the DART against religious oaths of office for Irish judges and presidents.

Dick Spicer, the then chairman, has criticised the educational system, claiming that it discriminates against non-believers. He resigned as chairman of the board of HAI in July 2010.

In November 2010, the Association objected to a pilot programme called "Goodness me, Goodness you" on the grounds that it separated children into believers and non-believers at an early age. They said that faith classes should take place outside school hours.

== See also ==
- Irreligion in the Republic of Ireland
- Secularism in the Republic of Ireland
