= Humanist Society Scotland =

Registered charity

- Formation: 1989; 37 years ago
- Type: Nonprofit organisation
- Registration no.: SC026570
- Legal status: Charity
- Headquarters: Dunfermline, Fife
- Location: Scotland
- Region served: Scotland
- Chief Executive: Jamie Dunlop
- Website: www.humanism.scot

Humanist Society Scotland is a Scottish registered charity that promotes humanist views and offers humanist wedding, funeral, and baby-naming ceremonies. It is a member of the European Humanist Federation and Humanists International.

In the 21st century, the HSS has grown in tandem with the rapid pace of secularisation in Scotland. Since 2016, it has been the largest provider of weddings in Scotland, performing more marriages each year than the Church of Scotland, Catholic Church in Scotland, or any religious group.

== History and aims ==
The Humanist Society of Scotland was formed in 1989 out of an association of local humanist groups around Scotland, the Society's objective is "to represent the views of people in Scotland who wish to lead good and worthwhile lives guided by reason and compassion rather than religion or superstition", and to provide a distinct Scottish voice in complement to the British Humanist Association. In 2018, the Society reported having over 15,000 members.

The official symbol of the Society is an adaptation of the Happy Human symbol which incorporates a Celtic knot. The author Christopher Brookmyre previously held the post of President between 2008 and 2015.

== Campaigns ==
The Society campaigns for a secular state in Scotland, and to abolish religious privilege.

Its main efforts have concentrated on seeking to allow legal humanist weddings, which succeeded in 2005, and to secularise state education.

=== Weddings ===
In January 2001, the Society lodged a petition with the Scottish Parliament calling for the Marriage (Scotland) Act 1977 to be amended to allow legal humanist wedding ceremonies, alongside religious and civil ones. Although the Act was not amended, section 12 of the Act allows the Registrar General for Scotland to authorise temporary additional celebrants. In 2005, the Registrar agreed to authorise 12 celebrants from the Humanist Society, in part because of a concern that allowing legal religious weddings but not legal humanist ones might not be consistent with the right to "freedom of thought, conscience and religion", which includes non-religious belief, in Article 9 of the European Convention on Human Rights. The first legal humanist wedding took place at Edinburgh Zoo on 18 June 2005 between Karen Watts (from Ireland) and Martin Reijns (from the Netherlands).

Humanist weddings have since becoming increasingly popular and, in 2010, with over 70 celebrants authorised to conduct them 2,092 legal humanist weddings took place in Scotland, becoming the third most popular form of Wedding in Scotland after Registrars and the Church of Scotland. The Society organises training, mentoring and performance reviews of celebrants, and submits names of celebrants to the Registrar General annually for authorisation. Prior to the Marriage and Civil Partnership (Scotland) Act 2014, the Society performed a similar role for celebrants to conduct same-sex commitment ceremonies and weddings, although formal authorisation by the Registrar is not required for these ceremonies since they had no effect on the legal status of individuals concerned. Since the legalisation of same-sex marriages, both sets of same-sex and opposite-sex marriages are treated the same way.

In 2017 the society received official status from the Scottish Parliament as the first non-religious body that could solemnise weddings. Scotland was from 2005 until 2018 the only part of the United Kingdom where humanist celebrants can solemnise marriages (Northern Ireland became the second in 2018 following a Humanists UK legal case). In 2017, the Society announced that it had married 50,000 people in legal ceremonies since their recognition in 2005. In 2017, the Society conducted more weddings than the Church of Scotland or the Scottish Catholic Church, prompting media discussions about the high profile of humanism in Scotland.

In 2018 official statistics obtained by BBC Radio 4 from the Scottish Courts and Tribunals Service showed that those who opted for a Humanist wedding were three time less likely to end in divorce than a Roman Catholic marriage and four times less likely to end in divorce than a civil marriage.

=== Education ===
In 2013 the group, along with the Edinburgh Secular Society, started a campaign against religious representation on council education committees in Scotland.

In 2016 the Society took a judicial review of the decision to not allow children and young people to opt out of compulsory religious observance in Scottish schools, after a UN Committee called for a change in practice in Scotland.

=== Other issues ===
The Society supported both the End of Life Assistance (Scotland) Bill, introduced in the Scottish Parliament by Margo MacDonald MSP and are involved in the campaign behind Liam McArthur MSP's proposed Assisted Dying for Terminally Ill Adults (Scotland) Bill launched in 2021.

They were also part of the campaign for equal marriage in Scotland to allow same sex couples to be legally married as an alternative to civil partnerships as well as allowing opposite sex couples access to civil partnerships.

Humanist Society Scotland have also campaigned to remove blasphemy from Scots law and to end funding for homeopathy on the National Health Service in Scotland.
