= Humanists Sweden =

Organization based in Sweden

Humanisterna
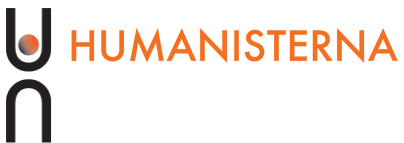
- Formation: 1979; 47 years ago
- Type: Nonprofit organisation
- Purpose: Working for a secular society and human rights, promoting a secular humanist lifestance
- Headquarters: Stockholm
- Region served: Sweden
- Members: 4,500
- Chairman: David Rönnegard
- Website: humanisterna.se

Humanists Sweden (Swedish: Humanisterna) is the largest humanist/rationalist organisation in Sweden with about 4,500 members. It is a member organisation of Humanists International (HI) and the European Humanist Federation (EHF).

Humanists Sweden work for a secular life stance founded on reason, compassion and responsibility. Its goals include a completely secular state, free of religious oppression, discrimination and other infringements on human rights. Humanists Sweden also promotes science and philosophy as primary methods for finding general knowledge and answers to empirical questions, staunchly opposing pseudoscience.

== Organisation and history ==
The organisation was founded in 1979 and was then called Human-Etiska Förbundet ("Humanist-Ethical Association"). The name was changed into the more international Humanisterna in 1999.

David Rönnegard has been chairman of the organisation since April 2020.

There are eleven local groups, situated in Gotland, Jönköping, Kalmar, Stockholm, Södertälje, Umeå, Uppsala, Värmland, Väst, Örebro, and Östergötland.

== Secular ceremonies ==
The majority of Sweden's population is not religious and there is an increasing demand for secular alternatives to religious ceremonies. The ceremonies of baptisms, marriages and funerals are still largely carried out in churches, conducted by priests, even though the participants rarely are practicing Christians. Humanisterna offers help and advice in creating secular ceremonies for those who don't wish to employ the Church of Sweden or other religious institutions. They also organize coming-of-age summer camps for teenagers where the participants get to discuss ethics, philosophy, religion, human rights, discrimination and other important issues. These are analogous to Christian confirmation camps, although a person does not need to be a member of Humanisterna or share the humanistic worldview to participate and no confession of faith is made.

== Humanisten ==
Humanists Sweden publishes a quarterly membership magazine called Humanisten ("the Humanist").

== Hedenius Award ==
The yearly award commemorates the Swedish philosopher Ingemar Hedenius, whose views - expressed in his book Tro och vetande ("Belief and knowledge") - were instrumental in starting the cultural debate that eventually led to the separating of the Swedish church and state. Its purpose is to acknowledge and support individuals who have worked, as Hedenius did, for a humanistic life stance, rationalism and critical thinking. The award was founded in 2000.

=== Previous winners ===
- 2019: Kvinnors Nätverk
- 2018: Niklas Orrenius
- 2017: Shamina Aktar
- 2016: RFSL Newcomers
- 2015: Ulf Danielsson
- 2014: Taslima Nasrin
- 2013: Sara Mohammad
- 2012: Nyamko Sabuni
- 2011: Gunnar Göthberg
- 2010: Staffan Bergström
- 2009: Elisabeth Ohlson Wallin
- 2008: Per Kornhall
- 2007: P. C. Jersild
- 2006: Björn Ulvaeus
- 2005: Lena Andersson
- 2004: Barbro Westerholm
- 2003: Hans Alfredson
- 2002: Georg Klein
- 2001: Sholeh Irani
- 2000: Dan Larhammar

== Kristallkulan ==
Kristallkulan ("the Crystal ball") is a prize of 100,000 SEK that will be awarded to anyone who can demonstrate beyond doubt that they possess a paranormal or supernatural talent that cannot be explained by conventional science. The award is similar to the One Million Dollar Paranormal Challenge offered by the James Randi Educational Foundation. The prize was instituted in 2005.
