= Icelandic Ethical Humanist Association =

Lifestance organization in Iceland

Siðmennt - Icelandic Ethical Humanist Association
- Siðmennt, félag siðrænna húmanista á Íslandi
- Abbreviation: IEHA
- Formation: Founded 15 February 1990; 36 years ago
- Legal status: Registered lifestance organization in Iceland
- Purpose: Humanism, secularism, family ceremonies
- President: Arndís Anna K. Gunnarsdóttir
- Website: sidmennt.is

The Icelandic Ethical Humanist Association (Icelandic: Siðmennt, félag siðrænna húmanista á Íslandi) is a humanist lifestance organization in Iceland, that promotes secularism, offers celebrancy services and contributes to the spreading of humanism in Iceland and abroad. It is a member of the European Humanist Federation and Humanists International.

== History ==
Siðmennt - the Icelandic Ethical Humanist Association (IEHA) was founded in February 1990, after running a successful civil confirmation program in the year before. The organization was named Siðmennt, which is derived from the Icelandic words "sið-" meaning "ethical" or "tradition" and "-mennt" for "education". IEHA has ever since offered civil confirmation, mainly to 14 year old youth, and has grown steadily over the years. As of 2020, around 13% of 14 year old's in Iceland, choose civil confirmation over the more traditional Christian confirmations offered by the Church of Iceland. In 2008, the organization started offering other secular ceremonies for the milestones in life; such as namegiving ceremonies, wedding ceremonies and funerals.

In 2013, the laws surrounding religious organizations were changed in Iceland, to include non-religious lifestance organizations. This was largely due to lobbyism on IEHA's behalf. On May 3 in the same year, IEHA became the first non-religious lifestance organization to gain full legal status by the Icelandic government, and was thus entitled to state funding, as well as other rights, equal to religious organizations in Iceland.

Since acquiring legal status as a lifestance organization, IEHA has experienced rapid growth, from around 300 members in 2013, to over 4000 at the end of year 2020. Additionally, IEHA has experienced more growth in members, than any other secular or religious lifestance organization in Iceland in the resent years.

Until 2015, IEHA operated largely at a voluntary base, with no formal headquarters nor full time staff. This changed in the aforementioned year, when it opened its first office in Reykjavík with full time employees.

== Main areas of focus ==
IEHA has three main areas of concern:

1. Humanism and ethics - Promotion of humanistic values and campaigning for human rights issues.
2. Secularism - Fighting for a secular society with a religious freedom and freedom from religion.
3. Family ceremonies – Secular namegivings, confirmations, weddings and funeral ceremonies conducted by trained humanist celebrants.

== Humanist Awards ==
From 2005 IEHA has awarded individuals, informal groups or organizations with an annual Siðmennt Award of Humanism for outstanding work on improving human rights in Iceland. In 2008, another award was added; the Siðmennt Award for Education and Science. Recipients include the Red Cross of Iceland, Owl Fisher, Kitty Anderson, Jón Gnarr, Páll Óskar Hjálmtýsson, Hörður Torfason and the National Queer organization of Iceland.

== Membership ==
As of 2022, IEHA is the 6th largest religious or secular lifestance organization in Iceland. Members were 4,781 in April 2022.

IEHA membership as registered by Register Iceland (1 January)
| Year | Population | Members | % | ± |
|---|---|---|---|---|
| 2014 | 325,671 | 612 | 0.19 | 0.00 |
| 2015 | 329,100 | 1,020 | 0.31 | 0.12 ▲ |
| 2016 | 332,529 | 1,456 | 0.44 | 0.13 ▲ |
| 2017 | 338,349 | 1,769 | 0.53 | 0.09 ▲ |
| 2018 | 348,580 | 2,329 | 0.67 | 0.14 ▲ |
| 2019 | 356,991 | 2,840 | 0.79 | 0.12 ▲ |
| 2020 | 364,185 | 3,509 | 0.96 | 0.17 ▲ |
