= Humanistischer Verband Deutschlands =

- Abbreviation: HVD
- Formation: 1993
- Type: Nonprofit organisation
- Legal status: Eingetragener Verein
- Purpose: Promotion of secular humanism
- Headquarters: Berlin
- Region served: Germany
- Members: 20,000
- Board spokesperson: Erwin Kress
- Affiliations: International Humanist and Ethical Union, European Humanist Federation
- Website: humanismus.de

The Humanistischer Verband Deutschlands (HVD; English: Humanist Association of Germany) is an organisation to promote and spread a secular humanist worldview and an advocate for the rights of nonreligious people. It was founded 1993 in Berlin and counts about 20,000 members. The HVD is a member of the International Humanist and Ethical Union and the European Humanist Federation.

== History ==
The federation was formed in 1993, some years after the reunification of Germany at the end of a difficult period for organised humanism, which had been stamped out by the Nazis early in the lead-up to World War II, and then suppressed by communism in the East and strong religious majorities in the West of Germany. HVD's predecessor, the German Freethinkers League, was very successful at the time it was targeted by Hitler, with 500,000 members across Germany.

== Aims ==
The HVD is committed to secularism, human rights, democracy, egalitarianism and mutual respect. The association works for an open and inclusive society with freedom of belief and speech, and for an end to the privileged position of religion and/or churches in law, education, broadcasting and wherever else it occurs.

== Activities ==
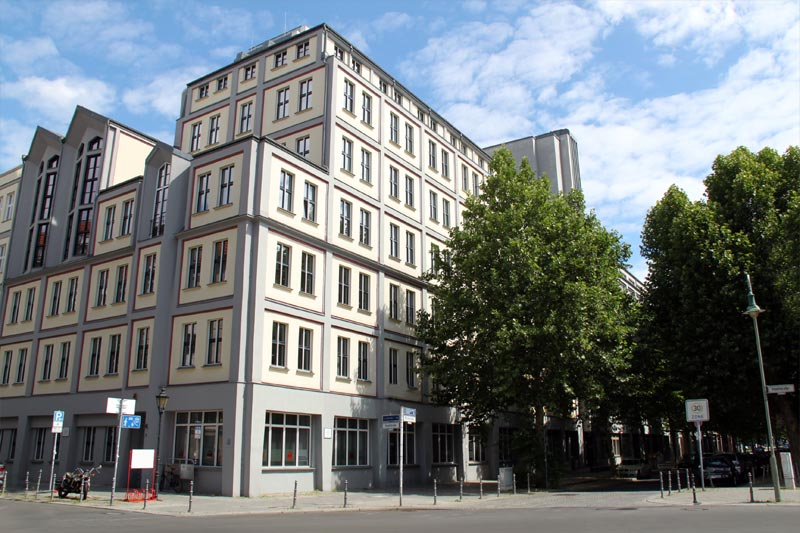
HVD headquarters in Berlin

The HVD is a provider of humanist and non-religious ceremonies in many regions, and maintains several Kindergartens in Berlin, Hanover and Braunschweig. In Berlin, the HVD is responsible for the optional school subject Humanistische Lebenskunde, with about 54,000 participants in 2013. The HVD supports a youth organisation Junge Humanistinnen & Humanisten in Deutschland (JuHu).

The association is a well-known consultant for advance health care directives, runs hospices and offers consultation on family planning and abortion.

== See also ==
- Irreligion in Germany
