= Marriage officiant =

Someone who can conduct a wedding

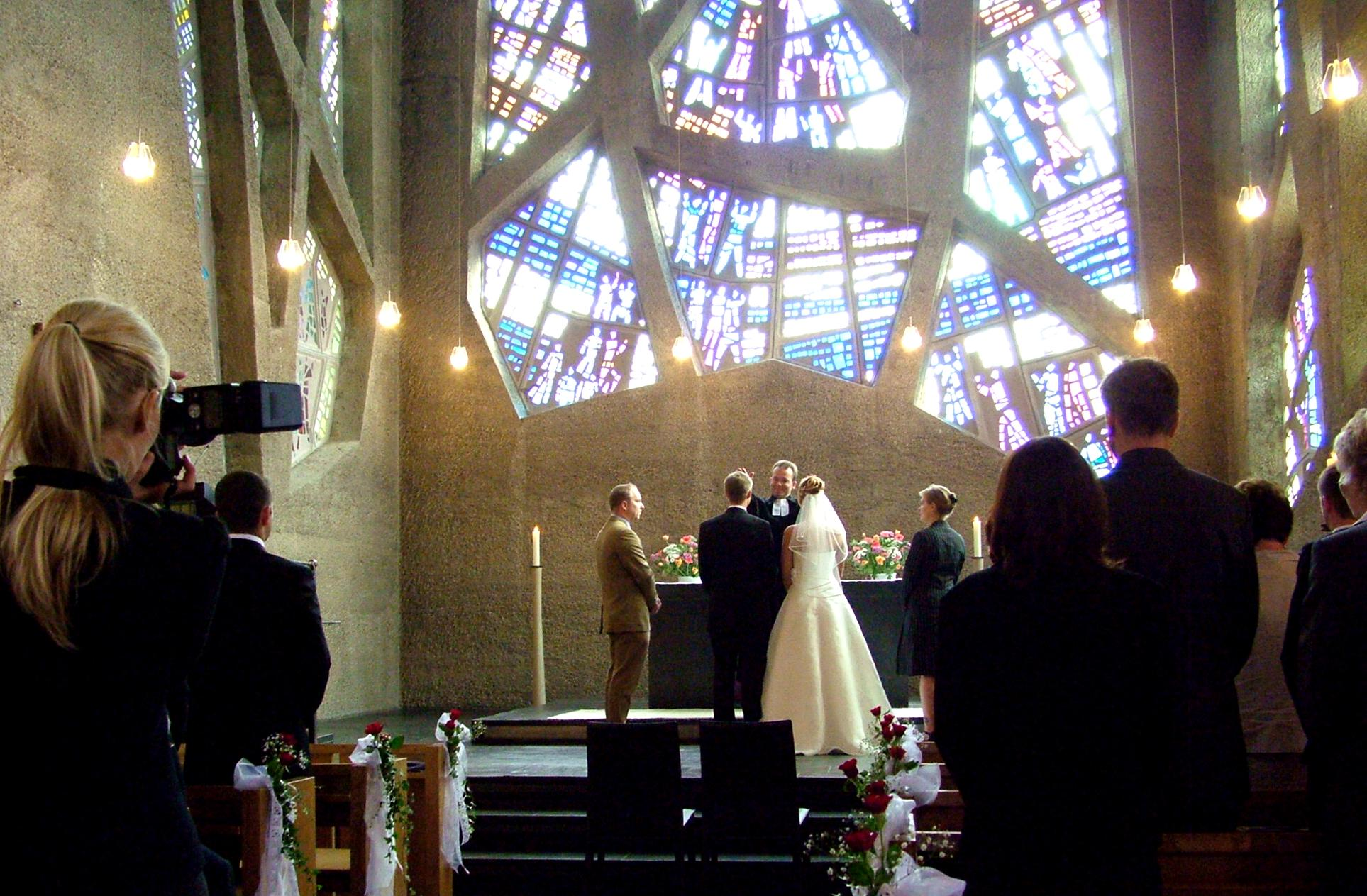
A Lutheran priest in Germany marries a young couple in a church.

A marriage officiant or marriage celebrant is a person who officiates at a wedding ceremony.

Religious weddings, such as Christian ones, are officiated by a pastor, such as a priest or vicar. Similarly, Jewish weddings are presided over by a rabbi, and in Islamic weddings, an imam is the marriage officiant. In Hindu weddings, a pandit is the marriage officiant.

Some non-religious couples get married by a minister of religion, while others get married by a government official, such as a civil celebrant, judge, mayor, or justice of the peace. A wedding without an officiant is called a self-uniting marriage.

== By faith ==
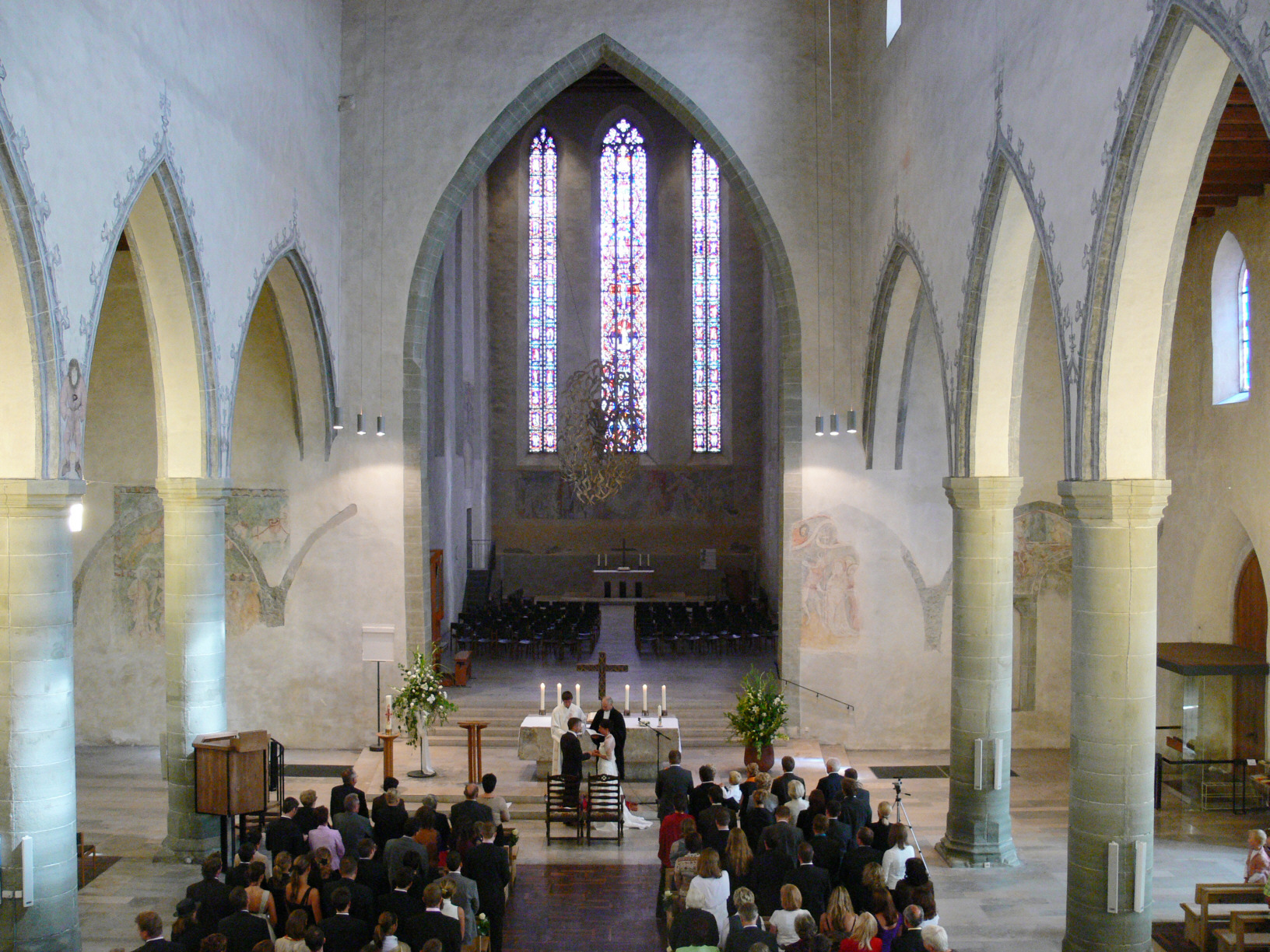
A Lutheran priest in Germany marries a young couple in a church.

Religious weddings are officiated by clergy people:

- Christianity:
  - Catholic, Lutheran, Orthodox, Anglican – Priest
  - Methodist, Moravian, Baptist, Reformed – Minister
  - Mormon – Bishop
- Hindu – Pujari
- Islamic – Imam
- Jewish – Rabbi

The officiant's duties and responsibilities, as well as who may be an officiant vary among jurisdictions.

=== Christianity ===
==== Catholicism ====
In the Catholic Church, it is the bride and groom who perform the Sacrament of Matrimony (marriage), but a marriage can only be valid if the Church has a witness at the wedding ceremony whose function is to question the couple to ensure that they have no obstacle to marriage (such as an un-annulled previous marriage or certain undisclosed facts between the couple) and that they are freely choosing to wed each other.

All ordained clergy (i.e. a deacon, priest, or bishop) may witness the wedding ceremony itself, though usually the wedding ceremony occurs during a Mass, which deacons lack the authority or ability to celebrate; however, in weddings that take place inside Mass, the deacon may still serve as the witness to the wedding, provided that a priest or bishop celebrates the Mass; and in weddings that take place outside Mass (which usually occurs in a marriage between a Catholic and a non-Christian or, less often, non-Catholic), the ceremony is the same for deacons, priests, and bishops (with few or no changes).

==== Protestantism ====
Protestant weddings are conducted by a pastor such as a priest as with Lutheranism and Anglicanism, or a minister as with Methodism.

===== Quaker =====
In Quaker weddings the couple marry each other with no third party officiating.

=== Islam ===
Islamic weddings are performed by imams.

=== Judaism ===
In Judaism, a rabbi officiates Jewish weddings. However, the rabbi's function is to ensure that the Jewish religious laws of the wedding ceremony are followed, particularly making sure that the Jewish witnesses are valid. The rabbi traditionally recites the blessing for the ceremony on behalf of the groom, although in ancient times the groom would have recited this blessing.

=== Non-religious ===
==== Non-denominational ====
Some organizations have limited or no requirements for ordination, like American Marriage Ministries and the Universal Life Church. Such organizations may be known as ordination mills; however, in most cases, their ordinations provide the same legal standing as mainstream officiants, and marriage licenses signed by such organization representatives are valid and recognized.

Many nonreligious people have their marriages in churches and officiated by Christian pastors, while others marry in mosques, and synagogues.

==== Humanist ====
A number of humanist organizations provide credentials to individuals who may solemnize marriages in whatever manner they choose; these are known as humanist celebrants.

== Civil ==
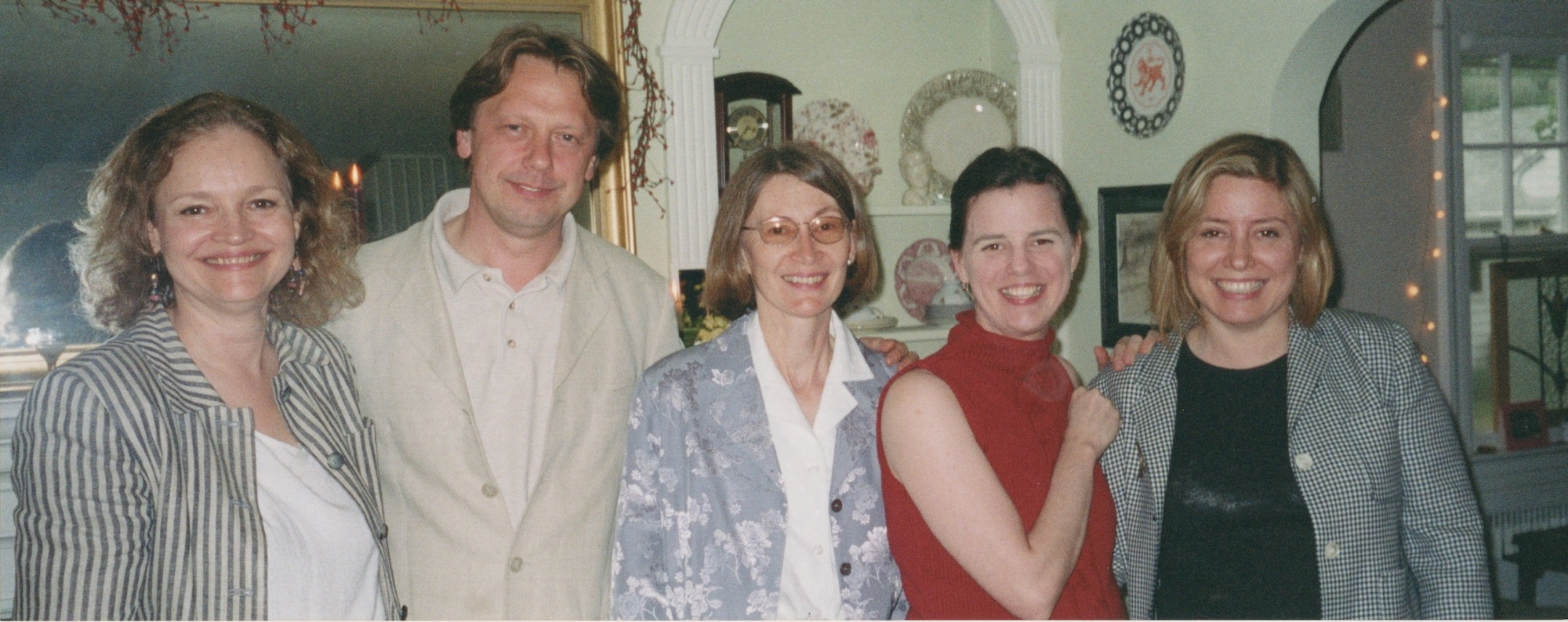
USA Celebrant Foundation Civil Celebrants May 2002 – Remi Bosseau, Frank Hentschker, Gaile Sarma, Cindy Reed, Charlotte Eulette

In the United States, a marriage officiant is a civil celebrant or civil officer such as a justice of the peace who performs acts of marriage or civil union. In some states, for example New Jersey, independent civil celebrants are certified by the government. They are required to undergo a course of training for at least 26 weeks. They are encouraged to provide ceremonies of meaning and substance. Their main legal responsibility is to witness the consent of the intended spouses for the wedding license and hence validate the marriage or civil union for legal purposes. Their main social and cultural responsibility is to create ceremonies which engender respect for the institution of marriage.

== By country ==
=== United States ===
In the United States, Canada and many other countries, marriages are legally performed by a member of the clergy, a public official (e.g. a judge), or where authorised, by a civil celebrant (e.g. New Jersey). Some celebrants perform same-sex weddings and commitment ceremonies.

Laws in each state of the United States vary about who has the ability to perform wedding ceremonies, but celebrants or officiants are usually categorized as "clergy" and have the same rights and responsibilities as ordained clergy. There is some controversy over whether these laws promote religious privilege that is incompatible with the United States Constitution.

=== Scotland ===
In Scotland, since a June 2005 ruling by the registrar general, humanist weddings are now legal, owing to a campaign by the Humanist Society Scotland. Currently quality marriages of meaning and substance, with significant creative input by the couple are performed by Scottish registrars—similar to that which civil celebrants perform elsewhere. Scotland is the only part of the United Kingdom where humanist weddings are recognised as legal by the state and is only one of eight countries in the world where humanist weddings are legally recognised, the others as of 2017 are: Australia, Canada, Iceland, Ireland, New Zealand, Norway and some states of the United States of America.

=== Australia ===
In Australia, celebrants have a slightly different role, as regulated by national law.

== Related articles ==
- Celebrant (Australia) – the civil celebrant movement began in Australia, in 1973 and there established its basic principles.
- Celebrancy – description of the profession of celebrancy.
- Lionel Murphy – Australian statesman who established civil celebrant in law and culture.
- Funeral celebrant – description, history, and ideals and principles of funeral celebrancy.
- Dally Messenger III – notable celebrant who progressed civil celebrancy in Australia, New Zealand, the United Kingdom the United States and elsewhere.
- Ceremony – an explanation of the components of ceremony and the skill set necessary to perform ceremonies (civil and religious).
- Marriage in Australia Summary of the legal status history and organising of marriage in Australia.
- Celebrant Foundation and Institute – information about the pioneer non-profit organisation which established civil celebrants in the United States based on the Australian model.
- Officiant – synonym for celebrant. Short article.
- Humanist celebrant – describes the diaspora of humanist society celebrants throughout the world with a heavy emphasis on the non-religious.
- Marriage officiant – (this site) religious and civil marriage in various religions and countries.
