= Celebrant =

Celebrant may refer to:

- Celebrant (Australia), person performing formal ceremonies of legal import in Australia
- Humanist celebrant, person performing humanist celebrancy services
- Celebrancy, officiation of secular ceremonies
- Officiant, leader of a service or ceremony
- Silverlode, fictional river in J. R. R. Tolkien's writings, see Lothlórien#Geography

Celebrants may refer to:

- Celebrants (album), 2023 album by Nickel Creek
