= Celebrancy =

Officiation of secular ceremonies

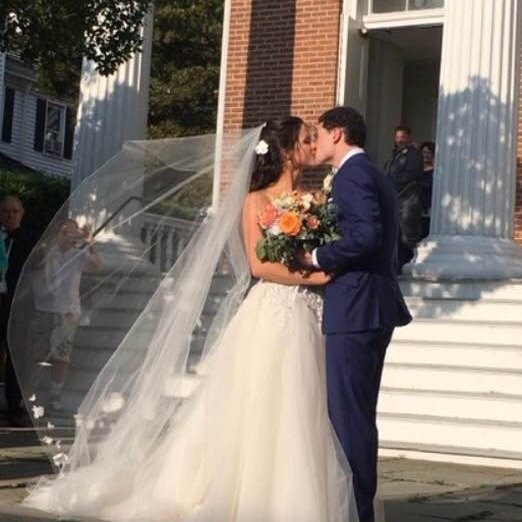
The wedding is a flagship ceremony of many cultures

Celebrancy is a profession founded in Australia in 1973 by the then Australian attorney-general Lionel Murphy. The aim of the celebrancy program was to authorise persons to officiate at secular ceremonies of substance, meaning and dignity mainly for non-church people. Up until this point legal marriages were reserved only to clergy or officers of the Births, Deaths & Marriages registry office. These appointed persons, referred to in the Marriage Act of Australia as "authorised celebrants", create and conduct weddings, funerals, namings, house dedications, coming of age and other life ceremonies for those who do not wish to be married or have other ceremonies in a church or registry office.

== Early history ==
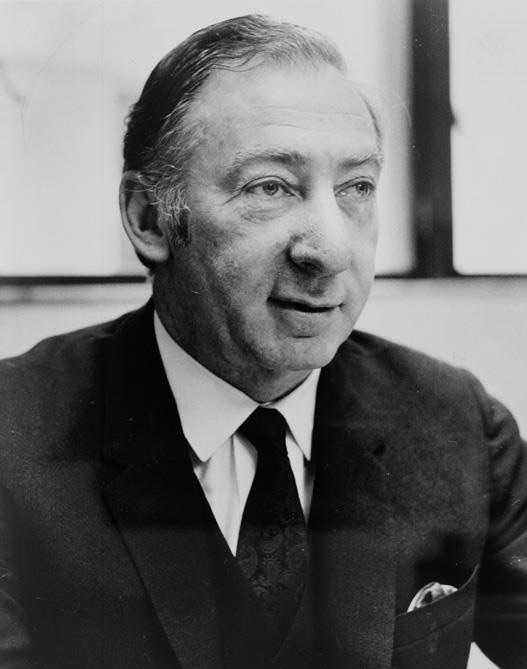
Lionel Murphy founded the civil celebrant movement in Australia, which has now spread to other countries

A senator, attorney-general and High Court Justice of Australia, Lionel Murphy was the founder of modern celebrancy. He had a very clear ideal that secular people were entitled to ceremonies of equal meaning, dignity and substance as those enjoyed by religious people. Murphy's vision, more carefully articulated as the program progressed, included training standards and a limit on the number of celebrants to be registered. Celebrants were to be mentored (later trained) to the highest standard. They were only to be appointed when there was an actual demand. The deeper meaning of the Murphy ideal was to improve the individual psychologically, and the community socially and culturally through ceremonies.

Celebrancy, celebrants and their ceremonies were clearly distinguished from past practice by Murphy's reforms:

- Control of ceremony was to be by the client, but advised and resourced by the celebrant. The marriage ceremony for example, up to this point, was that mandated by the religious or civil authority - resulting in constant complaints of hypocrisy and inappropriateness. Couples in celebrant ceremonies were now to be totally in charge of the words, content and style of their own ceremony.
- A radical change was the appointment of women, at a moment in history when, for hundreds of years, the only ceremony providers were men. (Paradoxically this Murphy decision is commonly acknowledged as having substantially supported the women in the churches who wished to become priests and bishops.)
- He also appointed Indigenous Australians as civil celebrants. Faith Bandler was one. (This was particularly significant in that Indigenous Australians had only been counted as humans in the census some six years before.)
- Another change of direction was the appointment of young people to do ceremonies. Lois D’Arcy, the first celebrant appointed, was a 26 year old mother of two babies. Carol Ditchburn, now Astbury, was 24 when appointed.
- His next was that citizens could choose their own celebrant— unheard of until then, both with church and with state.
- His radical assertion, a now obvious truth but still not fully absorbed, was that celebrating the milestones of life was just as important for secular people as it was for religious people.
- Another new freedom was Murphy's radical insert into the Australian Marriage Act 1961 are the words. "A marriage may be solemnised on any day, at any time and at any place."
- His conviction that culture matters —for everyone.

== Training of celebrants ==
Ideally, a celebrant needs to have a range of knowledge, attitudes and skills. A grounding in the arts appears to be essential. Ceremonies are composed of the performing and visual arts. Poetry, prose quotations and music are necessary components of most ceremonies. As the celebrant is a resource person and advisor to his/her clients, a transforming education in the arts and humanities would appear to be a prerequisite. Civil celebrant skill is to creatively combine appropriate poetry, prose, music, choreography and movement, storytelling, myth and symbolism into a ceremony of substance and power. Story-telling is basic to most ceremonies. The personal story of the development of a couple's relationship in a marriage, or a eulogy or panegyric at a funeral ceremony, or the expression of a parent's hopes or dreams in a Naming ceremony not only require research and verification but a considerable skill in creative writing in sync with the theme and purpose of the ceremony.

There are a number of prosaic skills and resources for which the celebrant is responsible. Australian law requires that every guest must be able to hear the words and music of a celebrant ceremony. Ceremonic celebrations occur in all sorts of places. Portable PA (public address) and music systems are often necessary equipment. This also requires skill in their use.

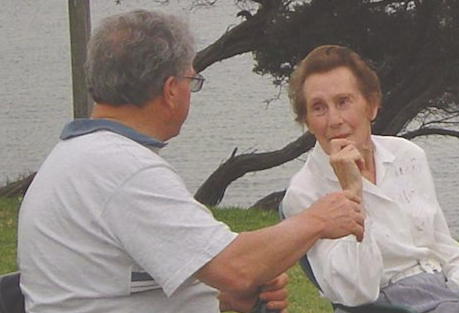
Jane Day discusses challenges with fellow celebrant trainer, Dr Chris Watson.

The experienced celebrant-educator and voice and speech coach Jane Day spent a great deal of her life emphasising to her students that all the other knowledge and skills of celebrancy means next to nothing unless the celebrant acquires the learned skill of delivery of the "spoken word, body language, and the written word". She was a strong advocate of developing appropriate theatrical skills stating that all civil celebrants are "performers". They need to have a voice delivery which creates "respect and trust, inspires, encourages, sympathises and feeds the human hunger for emotional as well as intellectual satisfaction".

== Celebrancy: Administration change in Australia ==
In 2003, changes to the regulation of celebrant training in Australia allowed a larger number of registered training organisations to enter the sector. This resulted in a significant increase in the number of registered celebrants.

== United States ==
In the United States, however, clergy (and in some jurisdictions, the couple itself, in a self-uniting marriage,) perform legally binding weddings. However, weddings in the United states are also performed by an officer of the court, such as a judge or a justice of the peace.

The official launch of civil celebrants in the USA took place at the Montclair Library in Montclair New Jersey on Thursday 12 June 2002. Philanthropists Gaile and Raghu Sarma had sponsored the visit of Dally Messenger III, an experienced celebrant from Australia, to train the first group of celebrants according to the Murphy principles - especially the commitment to bring dignity and beauty into ceremonies for non-religious and non-church people.

Messenger gave the keynote address on "The importance of Ceremony and of Rites of Passage in your life". Messenger, "honestly and emotionally", called for deeper and more personalised ceremonies for secular people.

=== Secular spirituality ===
Messenger maintained that even though celebrant ceremonies were non-religious it was important that they express a person or couple's "spiritual" beliefs and qualities.

The US has a wide variety of religions and inter-faith bodies and independent inter-faith ministers. Civil celebrants have taken their place between the dogmatic and non-dogmatic religions and the avowedly atheistic Humanist society stance on ceremonies. In the loose American system, which includes the Unitarian Universalist Association there is a wide variety of officiants from which to choose. One example of how the secular celebrant movement has spread to the United States, was in 2005 Richard Pryor who was buried at Forest Lawn Cemetery in a non-religious service led by a secular funeral celebrant.

Each US state authorises persons from various religions and bodies to officiate at legal marriages. The concept of the "civil celebrant" is gaining recognition. For example, New Jersey has a clear category for "civil celebrants". Persons may apply for registration once they have completed an audited six month training course of at least two face-to-face sessions per week in celebrant philosophy and history, ceremony structure and ceremonial presentation.

== Europe ==
In some European countries a celebrant who is not registered to conduct legal marriages but who is active in the business profession of conducting non-legal wedding ceremonies is known as a "lay celebrant". Lay celebrants have been a way of life in many European countries for many years. Churches have never given any authority to conduct legal marriages. In these European countries where marriages can only be conducted at a government registry office, it is acceptable for couples to have a second personalised non-legal wedding ceremony with family and friends conducted by a lay celebrant.

== New Zealand ==
New Zealand followed Australia in 1976 with civil celebrants authorised by government. Government administration is praised by celebrants and citizens alike as encouraging high quality ceremonies and striking the right ratio of celebrants to the population.

== United Kingdom, Ireland, Scotland and Canada ==
In the United Kingdom, Ireland, Scotland and Canada there are, as of 2021, private training colleges which are educating civil celebrants following the Australian model. These colleges and their professional associations have emerged to provide accreditation and to set and uphold standards. Some lobby their governments for registration of their graduates to conduct legal marriages. Alongside these private training colleges and associations, there is a strong tradition for UK-based artist-led celebrancy practices, particularly the work of Sue Gill, Gilly Adams and Dead Good Guides who lead on such trainings.

== See also ==
- Celebrant (Australia) - the civil celebrant movement began in Australia in 1973 and there established its basic principles.
- Funeral celebrant Description, history, and ideals and principles of funeral celebrancy.
- Dally Messenger III - notable celebrant who progressed civil celebrancy in Australia, New Zealand, the United Kingdom the United States and elsewhere.
- Ceremony - an explanation of the components of ceremony and the skill set necessary to perform ceremonies (civil and religious).
- Marriage in Australia Summary of the legal status history and organising of marriage in Australia.
- Celebrant Foundation and Institute - information about the pioneer non-profit organisation which established civil celebrants in the USA based on The Australian model.
- Officiant - synonym for celebrant. Short article.
- Humanist celebrant - describes the diaspora of Humanist Society celebrants throughout the world with a heavy emphasis on the non-religious.
- Marriage officiant - religious and civil marriage in various religions and countries.
