= Institute of Civil Funerals =

British non-profit organization

The Institute of Civil Funerals (IoCF) is a British non-profit, professional member organization that regulates the quality of civil funerals in the UK. The Institute was established as a result of the registration review white paper published in January 2002, entitled Civil Registration: Vital Change Chapter 4, New Services.

== Objectives ==
The IoCF defines a civil funeral as "a funeral which is driven by the wishes, beliefs and values of the deceased and their family, not by the beliefs or ideology of the person conducting the funeral". Civil funeral celebrants lead the funeral ceremony and worked in consultation with the family and the funeral director.

Membership is open only to celebrants who have achieved the highest accredited qualification for funeral celebrants, the Level 3 Diploma in Funeral Celebrancy. Members undergo annual assessments from other professionals in the funeral sector and complete an annual requirement for continuing professional development (CPD).
