= Natasha Johns-Messenger =

Australian sculptor, artist

Natasha Johns-Messenger (born 1970) is an Australian artist and filmmaker, who has lived and worked in New York and Melbourne. She is known for her large-scale site-determined installations that examine spatial perception and light.

In 2007, she won the Den Haag Sculptuur Rabo Bank Prize presented to her by Queen Beatrix of the Netherlands, and in 2005 Johns-Messenger won the Melbourne Prize for Urban Sculpture with her then collaborative group OSW.

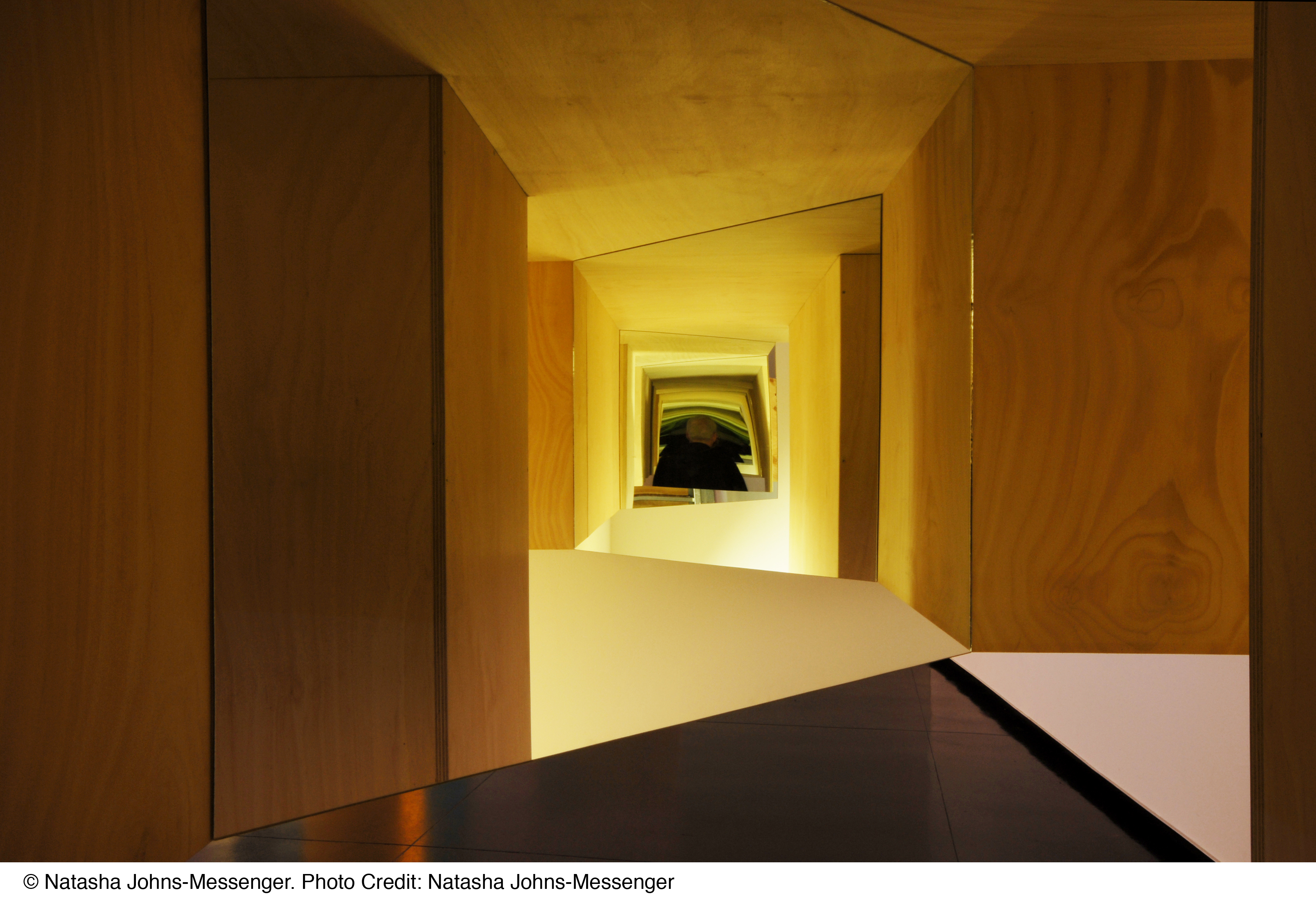
Natasha Johns-Messenger, Automated Logic, NEW 06, Australian Centre for Contemporary Art (ACCA), 2006. Curated by Juliana Engberg

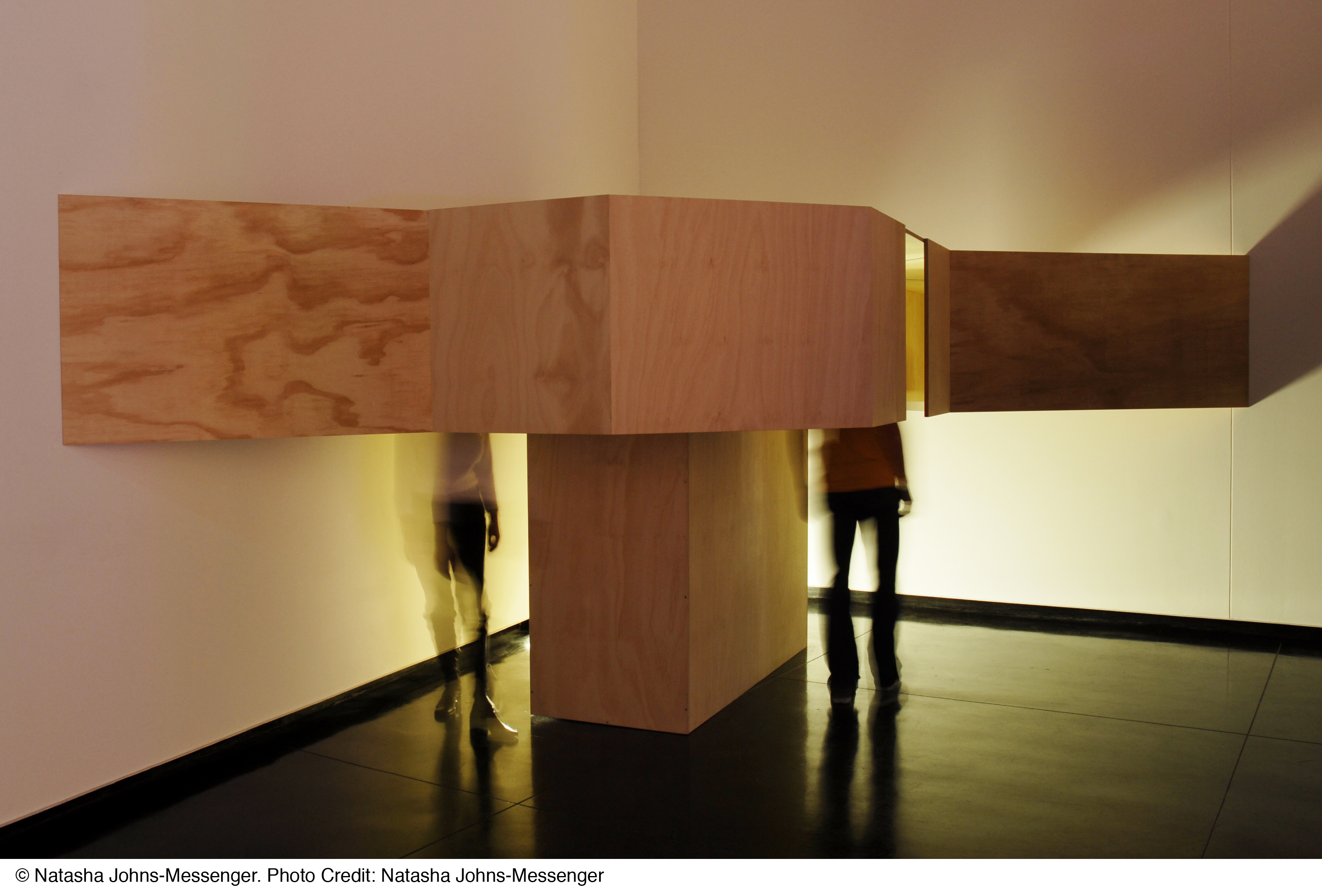
Natasha Johns-Messenger, Automated Logic, NEW 06, Australian Centre for Contemporary Art (ACCA), 2006. Curated by Juliana Engberg

== Biography ==
Johns-Messenger was born in Australia in 1970. She began her artistic practice as a painter before moving toward installation and site-responsive work. She studied fine art at the Royal Melbourne Institute of Technology (RMIT University), completing a Bachelor of Arts in Fine Arts with first-class honours in painting in 1994. She subsequently completed a Master of Fine Art by Research in installation at RMIT in 2000.

In 2012, Johns-Messenger completed a Master of Fine Arts in Film at Columbia University in New York. Her postgraduate film studies expanded her practice from physical installations and photography into narrative filmmaking. She later became a PhD candidate in architecture at RMIT.

=== Family ===
Johns-Messenger is a descendant of Australian rugby player Dally Messenger. Her sister is singer Julia Messenger. Her mother, Catherine Johns, is a poet and novelist, while her father, Dally Messenger III, is an author associated with the Australian civil celebrant movement.

== Artistic pracitce ==
Johns-Messenger began exhibiting in Melbourne during the 1990s. She was associated with Gertrude Contemporary in Melbourne, where she was a studio artist from 2001 to 2003. Her early exhibitions included presentations at George Paton Gallery, Gertrude Contemporary, Bus Gallery and other artist-run and public exhibition spaces. She also received an early public-art commission from the Museum of Victoria's Scienceworks Museum in 2001.

Her work subsequently appeared in exhibitions at institutions including the Museum of Contemporary Art Australia in Sydney, the Australian Centre for Contemporary Art in Melbourne, the Perth Institute of Contemporary Arts and the Gallery of Modern Art in Brisbane. Her international exhibition history includes projects in the Netherlands, Japan, the United States and other countries.

=== Exhibitions ===
In 2016, Johns-Messenger presented Sitelines, her first solo museum exhibition, at Heide Museum of Modern Art in Melbourne. Curated by Linda Michael, the exhibition included installations, photographs and light works that altered the relationship between Heide's interior galleries and surrounding landscape.

In 2018, Johns-Messenger collaborated with architect John Wardle and John Wardle Architects on Somewhere Other, which was presented as part of the 16th International Architecture Exhibition of the Venice Biennale. The project subsequently formed the basis of an Adelaide//International exhibition at the Samstag Museum of Art in Adelaide in 2020.

Her another work is Water-Orb (2018), commissioned for the Ian Potter Sculpture Court at the Monash University Museum of Art. The installation uses water, mirrors and a sculptural structure to create an optical effect in which water appears to defy conventional expectations of gravity and movement.

Her work has also been included in exhibitions and programs associated with the International Studio & Curatorial Program in New York, the Australian Centre for Contemporary Art, RMIT Gallery, the Gallery of Modern Art in Brisbane and other institutions.

=== Public art ===
Johns-Messenger has produced a public artworks in Australia and the United States. These include ThisSideIn in New York and Alterview at Hunters Point HS/IS 404. Her later public commissions have included EllipseCircleView, commissioned by Manningham City Council for Ruffey Lake Park in Victoria.

In 2023, Johns-Messenger received the Southern Way McClelland Commission for Compass 23, a steel sculpture designed to engage viewers' perception of space through optical effects.

Her 2024 public artwork SoftTime was commissioned by the Monash University Museum of Art and Monash University for the Caulfield campus.

=== Film ===
Johns-Messenger expanded into filmmaking while studying at Columbia University. Her 2012 short film Blackwood, made as her Columbia graduate film, was directed by her and co-written with Toby Fell-Holden. Blackwood received the Columbia University Film Festival Alumni Award for Best Film and awards associated with the National Board of Review and the Adrienne Shelly Foundation. It was subsequently shown at international film festivals, including the Warsaw Film Festival.

Her earlier film Off-Ramp was screened as part of the Columbia University Film Festival program and later received the Best Student Film award at the Los Angeles International Underground Film Festival; its lead performer, Beth Dixon, received the festival's Best Actress award.

=== Recent works ===
In 2024, Johns-Messenger continued her public-art practice with SoftTime at Monash University's Caulfield campus and EllipseCircleView at Ruffey Lake Park. She was also a finalist in the 2024 Bowness Photography Prize at the Museum of Australian Photography.

In 2025, she presented LightWater as part of the Lorne Sculpture Biennale.

== Awards and recognition ==
- Jaguar/Belle Designers of the Future Award for Public Art/Installation — 2000.
- Inaugural Melbourne Prize for Urban Sculpture 2005, received with Open Spatial Workshop for Groundings.
- Rabobank Den Haag Sculpture Prize — 2007, Netherlands. The prize was presented by Queen Beatrix of the Netherlands.
- Columbia University Film Festival Alumni Award for Best Film — 2012, for Blackwood.
- National Board of Review Motion Pictures Award 2012, associated with Blackwood.
- Adrienne Shelly Foundation Best Director Award — 2012, for Blackwood.
- EQUS Quantum Art Competition — 2023.
- Southern Way McClelland Commission — 2023, for Compass 23.

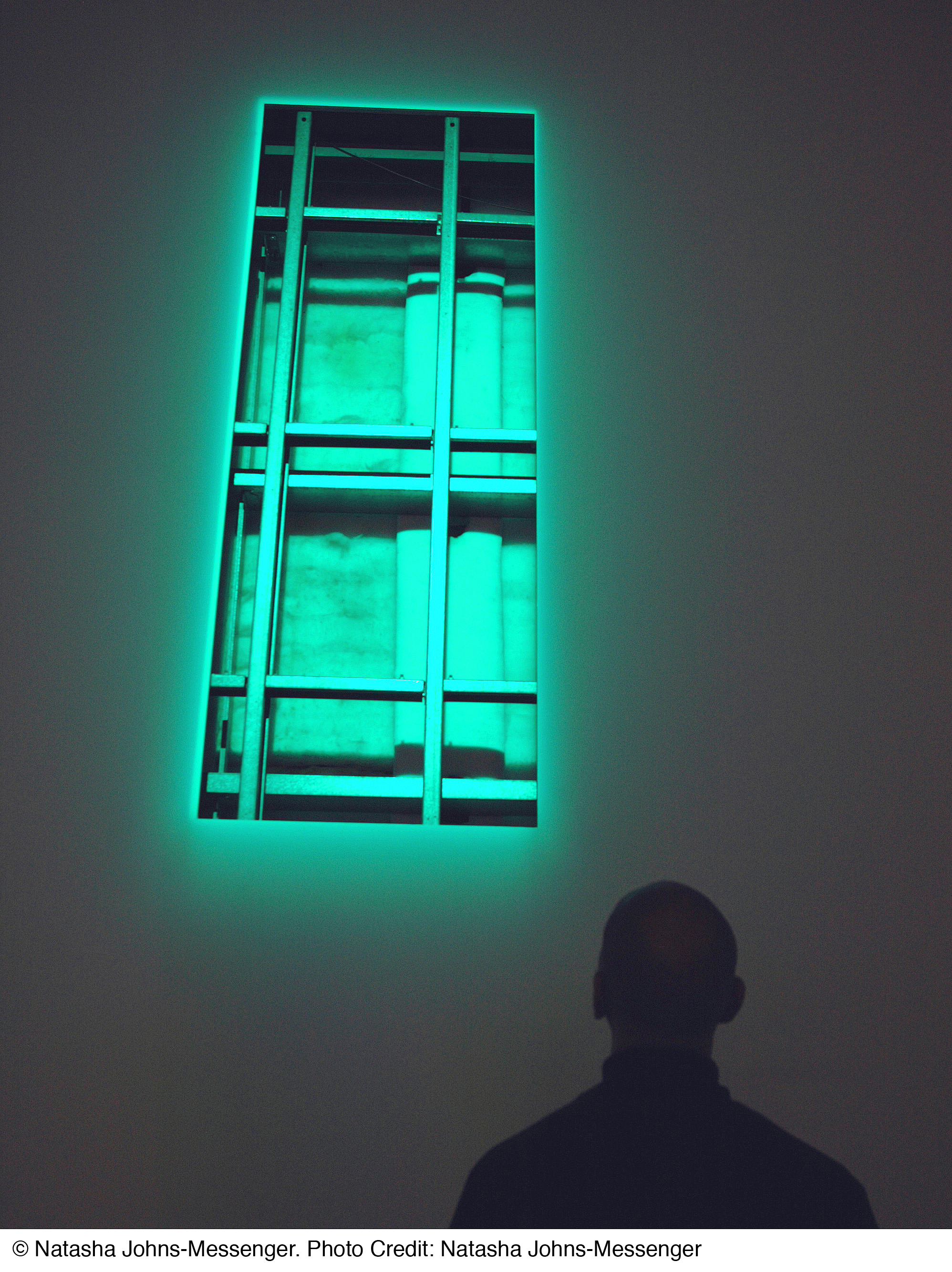
Natasha Johns-Messenger, Automated Logic, NEW 06, Australian Centre for Contemporary Art (ACCA), 2006. Curated by Juliana Engberg

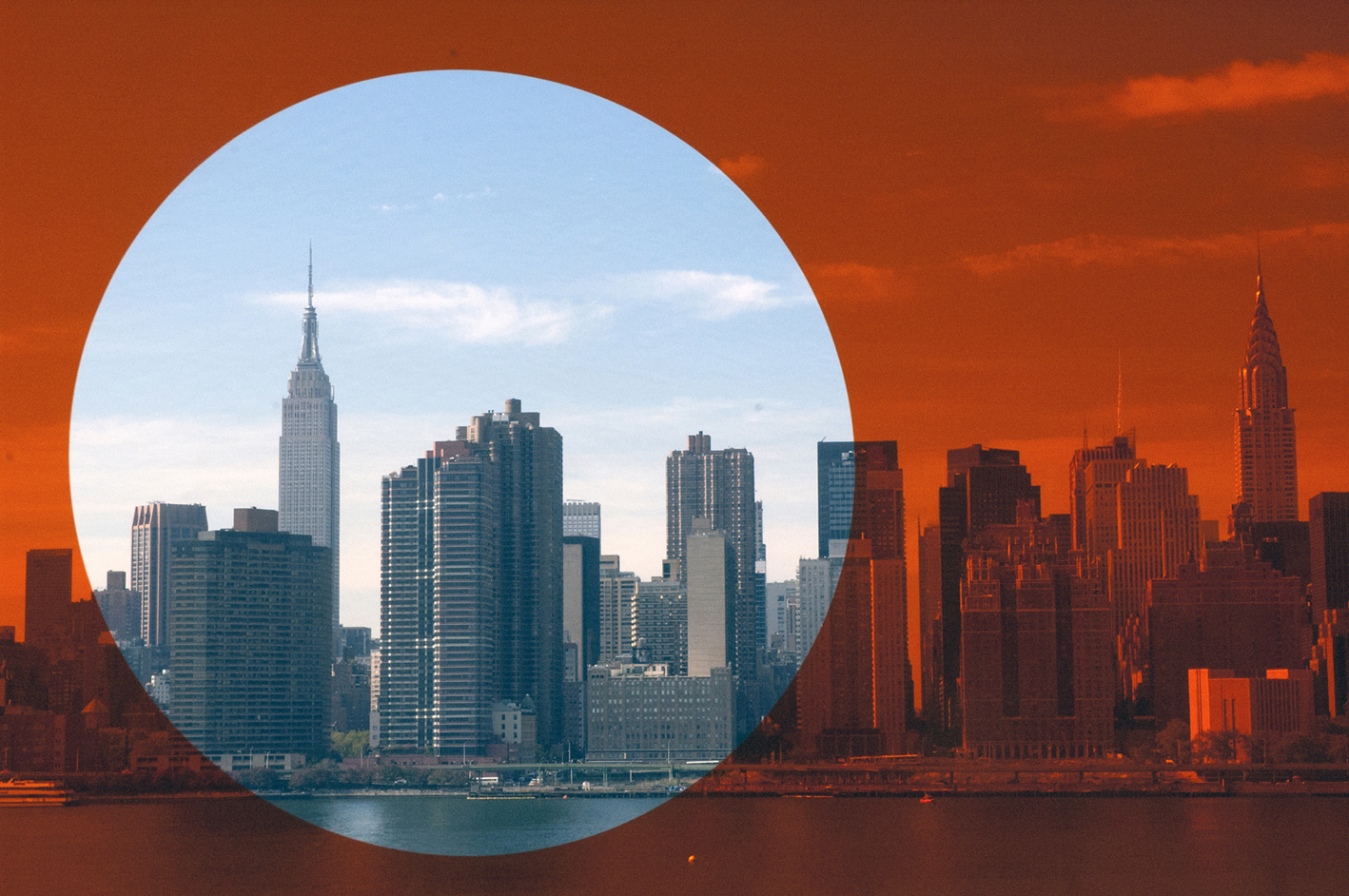
Natasha Johns-Messenger, Alterview 2013, Percent for Art, New York City Department of Cultural Affairs Commission, Hunters Point, New York
