= InvoCare =

Invocare Limited
- Type: [Proprietary]
- Industry: Funeral Services
- Founded: 2001
- Headquarters: Sydney, Australia
- Number of locations: 320+ funeral homes & 17 cemetery crematoria (2023)
- Key people: Linda Mellors CEO
- Products: Funerals, Cemeteries, Cremations, Pre-planning, Pet Cremation
- Website: invocare.com.au

InvoCare Limited (InvoCare) was an Australian company (but now US owned) with funeral interests in Australia, New Zealand and Singapore. InvoCare employs around 2,000 people globally and has a current turnover of approximately $500 million a year.

== Incorporation ==
InvoCare Limited was created in 2001 as part of a divestment by Service Corporation International who sold an 80% stake of their Australian funeral division to a consortium led by Macquarie Bank. In 2003 InvoCare Limited was floated on the Australian Securities Exchange. In 2023 TPG Capital completed a $1.8 billion takeover. InvoCare previously traded on ASX which has since been removed.

== Brands ==
InvoCare owns and operates a number of funeral service brands in the Australian and New Zealand marketplaces and operate more than 270 funeral homes and 16 cemeteries and crematoria in their network.

=== Australian Brands ===
In Australia, InvoCare own three national brands - White Lady Funerals, Simplicity Funerals and Value Cremations which make up approximately 120 locations and mobile services. In addition to these brands, InvoCare also have more than 40 regional brands including Le Pine Funerals in Victoria (Australia), Guardian Funerals in New South Wales, Purslowe & Chipper Funerals in Western Australia and George Hartnett Metropolitan Funerals in Queensland.

=== New Zealand Brands ===
In New Zealand, InvoCare own approximately 35 funeral homes. Brands in New Zealand include Gee & Hickton Funeral Directors in Upper & Lower Hutt, Elliots Funeral Services in Bay of Plenty, Fountains Funerals Directors & Advisors in South Auckland, Lychgate Funeral Homes in Wellington, and Resthaven Funeral Services in Auckland.

=== Controversies ===
InvoCare, along with the Australian funeral industry generally, has been dogged by controversies relating to pricing and misleading customers.

In November 2014, InvoCare Limited paid a penalty of $102,000 to the Australian Competition and Consumer Commission (ACCC) for "allegedly making a false or misleading representation" for advising customers who had pre-purchased burial sites that they were contractually required to purchase memorial plaques from InvoCare, when this was not the case.

In November 2019, an investigation by CHOICE Magazine found that InvoCare was charging fees for no service and gouging hundreds of dollars from bereaved Australian families.

"The listed company, which operates the high profile brands White Lady Funerals and Simplicity Funerals, has been challenged over its practice of adding an "unnecessary" late fee of $352 by default to its bills. The invoices clearly show InvoCare funeral homes incorporating the late fee into the total figure of all invoices," consumer advocate CHOICE said. CEO Martin Earp initially defended the 'administration fee' but the funeral giant was forced into a backdown in February 2020, when it was announced that the late payment fee, billed in advance – would be removed from its customers’ invoices.

It is thought that the decision followed CHOICE's successful appeal to the ACCC that Invocare had breached consumer law.

The controversy earned InvoCare the 2020 CHOICE Shonky Award, for failing to be upfront about prices.

=== 2020 Coronavirus ===
InvoCare was one of the few ASX companies whose shares held up during the market rout of March 2020. That run came to an end when the Federal Government announced funerals would be limited to 10 attendees. Shares in InvoCare fell 18% overnight, crashing to a low of $9.07 as a result of the Government’s announcement. The funeral operator advised that it was beginning to see an impact on its core business due to restrictive social gathering measures. It said the inability to provide its full range of services would impact business performance, however, the scale of the impact was difficult to quantify.

As lockdown measures recede, Invocare appears to have lost the confidence of the market. Business analyst Simply Wall Street has calculated that Invocare's ROCE (Return On Capital Employed (ROCE) or the mount of pre-tax profits a company can generate from the capital employed in its business, is 7%, down from 9.4% three years ago. The present figure is significantly lower than the current business average ROCE of 9.3%
