= Celebrant (Australia) =

People who conduct formal ceremonies

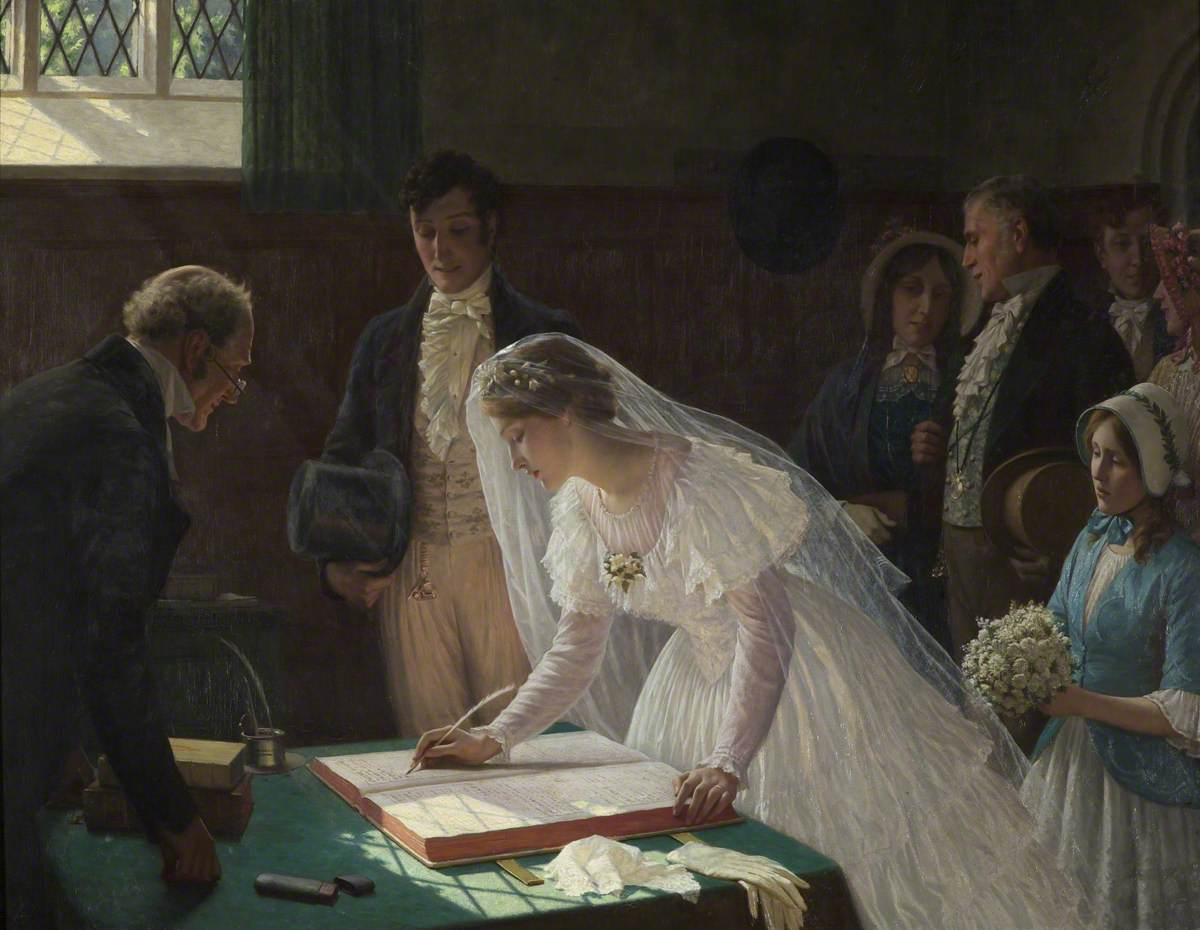
- Celebrants generally practise the traditional Western legal requirement of recording the wedding in a register. Celebrant clients choose their own ceremony but many still opt for the traditional white wedding, wherein the bride wears a white wedding dress and veil. Painting by Edmund Leighton (1853–1922)

Occupation
- Names: Celebrant, officiant, ceremony provider
- Synonyms: Officiant, master of ceremonies
- Occupation type: Profession / vocation
- Activity sectors: Non-church society

Description
- Competencies: Creative writing, ceremonial public speaking, listening skills, ceremony structure, knowledge of poetry, music, mythology, story telling, law
- Education required: Steeped in the humanities
- Related jobs: For religious persons – clergy

In Australia, celebrants or civil celebrants are people who conduct formal ceremonies in the community, particularly weddings – which represent the main ceremony of legal import conducted by celebrants – and for this reason are often referred to as marriage celebrants. They may also conduct extra-legal ceremonies such as naming of babies, renewal of wedding vows, funerals, divorces, becoming a teenager, changing name, significant birthdays, retirements, and other life milestones. Officiating at a marriage requires that the celebrant be an authorised marriage celebrant under Australian law, or the law where the marriage takes place, but officiating at non-legal ceremonies does not.

== Marriage celebrants ==
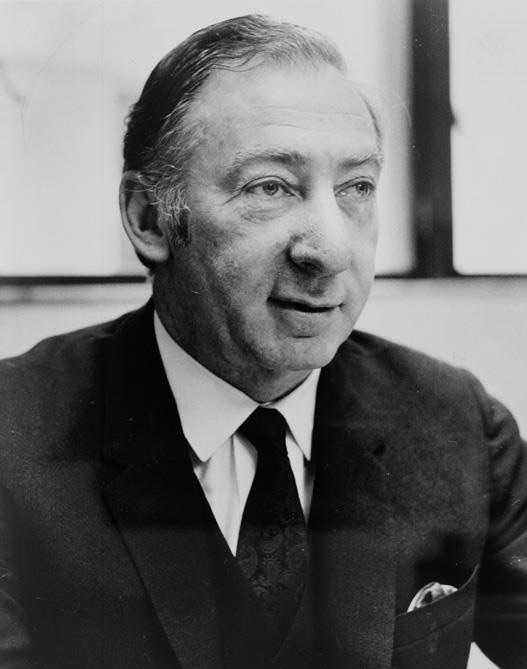
Senator, Attorney-General and High Court Justice Lionel Murphy, founder of the civil celebrant movement in Australia, which has now spread to the rest of the Western World.

Many Western nations permit civil celebrants to perform basic, legal, marriage ceremonies. However Australia was the first nation whose government appointed non-clergy celebrants with the intention of creating ceremonies which aspire to be as culturally enriching and, if required, as formal, as church weddings. That is, civil and religious wedding ceremonies would be of equal cultural status.

An "authorised celebrant" is authorised by the Australian Government to perform legal marriages according to the Marriage Act 1961. The celebrant may be a representative of a religious organisation (a religious marriage celebrant) or someone providing non-religious weddings (a civil marriage celebrant). In Australia, only authorised (registered) marriage celebrants have the authority to perform marriages.

In 2020, 80.3 per cent of Australian marriages were performed by civil celebrants. However, the rate of civil marriages varied between states and territories, with a civil marriage rate of 75.5% in New South Wales, 81.2% in Victoria, 84.3% in Queensland, 79.7% in South Australia, 84.1% in Western Australia, 86.8% in Tasmania, 83.9% in the Northern Territory and 82.7% in the Australian Capital Territory.

Marriage by independent civil celebrant has spread in other English-speaking countries. Its early establishment in Australia was largely due to the support of the reforming Attorney-General Lionel Murphy in the 1970s.

== Descriptive definition ==
A civil marriage celebrant is authorised by the government to perform legal civil marriages in a dignified and culturally acceptable manner, for those who choose a non-religious ceremony.

Civil celebrants also serve people with religious beliefs but who do not wish to be married in a place of worship or by a clergy person. In contrast to the established ceremonies of religious or registry office weddings, the couple in celebrant ceremonies make almost all decisions about the content. Thus, the civil celebrant has the role of a professionally trained ceremony provider who works in accordance with the wishes of the client couple and advises them. The task may be likened to an architect who is charged with designing a dream home for a couple who need expert help. In this sense the celebrant is not just the one who performs the ceremony according to law, but its facilitator, the couple's guide, the resource person, the co-creator of the ceremony, and the rehearsal-director.

The celebrant does not come from the standpoint of belief or unbelief. Trained celebrants usually operate professionally on the principle that their own beliefs and values are irrelevant.

== Motives for reform ==
Major religious affiliations in Australia by census year

Commentators such as Geraldine Doogue have suggested the following reasons why civil celebrancy was introduced, and why it succeeded so quickly:

- The 1970s in Australia was a time of questioning established institutions and profound social change.
- There was great dissatisfaction with the "registry office" marriages of the time. Couples, who could not or would not use clergy, often found registry office weddings perfunctory, undignified and humiliating. The Anglican and Roman Catholic churches, the major denominations at that time, discouraged or forbad remarriage of divorced people. The alternative was the Registry Office. The proceedings seemed liable to add to the distress of couples who were defying their own church's rules.
- There was dissatisfaction with the main Christian denominations of the time, especially the Roman Catholic and Anglican churches, especially the treatment of divorced persons and of those who chose partners of other denominations ("mixed marriages").
- There were strong [and sometimes militant] objections to marriage and the marriage ceremony wording by feminists.
- National census figures showed an increasing percentage of people declaring themselves "No religion".
- Divorces, though common, were expensive, traumatic, and involved legal apportioning of blame. This indirectly tainted the institution of marriage.

== Origin of civil celebrancy in Australia ==
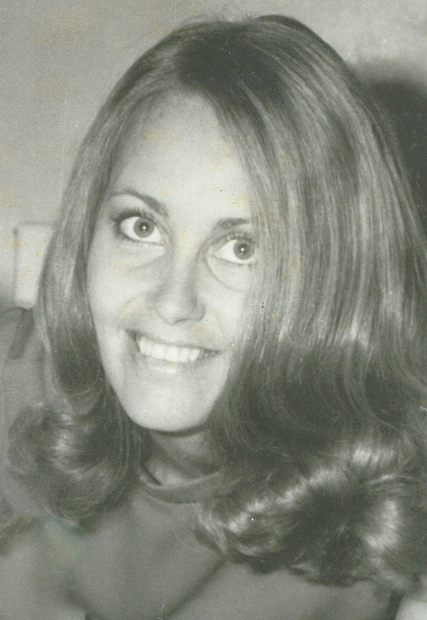
Lois D'Arcy was the first independent civil marriage celebrant ever appointed – by Attorney-General Lionel Murphy. Her appointment is dated 19 July 1973.

Civil celebrancy was established by the Australian Commonwealth Attorney General Lionel Murphy on 19 July 1973, when his first appointee, Lois D'Arcy, was categorised as a civil marriage celebrant. Later, as civil marriage celebrants branched out into the performance of other ceremonies such as funerals and namings the term was shortened to civil celebrant. According to civil celebrant Dally Messenger III:

The civil celebrant program is almost entirely the result of one man's vision. Murphy himself told me the story of how he was opposed by his own staff, the public service, his fellow members of parliament and officials of the Labour Party. He defied all, and, on 19 July 1973, in the dead of night, typed the first appointment himself, found the envelope and stamp, walked to a post box and posted it himself.

In fact the enabling legislation, the Marriage Act, had been passed in 1961 but Murphy's personal involvement in using the Act's powers and bypassing the bureaucracy made him a hero to the first civil celebrants. Lois D'Arcy, in a 1992 address to celebrants, recollected Murphy's own account of his authorising the first appointment:

[Lionel had] returned to his office one evening. There he had taken a piece of paper with his letterhead, typed my authorisation, and then placed it in an envelope, which he then posted to me. What other person in such a high position would have done such a thing. No one other than Lionel Murphy!

Murphy's stance on marriage reform (and on divorce reform) was part of wider desire to free Australians from restrictive laws. High Court Justice Michael Kirby remarked in 2000:

Lionel Murphy was a big figure on the stage of Australian public life. He pursued with energy, imagination and determination a vision of Australian society which was not warped and gnarled and inward-looking. It was one which reached out to everyone, particularly the disadvantaged.

== Lionel Murphy: radical achievements ==
With regard to the marriage celebrant program – Dally Messenger III summarised Murphy's achievement as follows:

Lionel Murphy was a real radical. I am still amazed at his vision. He shocked the system.

- His first legal reversal was the control of ceremony. The marriage ceremony, up to this point, was that mandated by the religion or civil authority – resulting in constant complaints of hypocrisy. Couples in celebrant ceremonies were now totally in charge of the words and actions of their own ceremony.
- His second U-turn within the social system was the appointment of women —at a moment in history when, for hundreds of years, the only ceremony providers were men. (Paradoxically this Murphy decision is commonly acknowledged as having substantially supported the women in the churches who wished to become priests and bishops.)
- His third shock to the social system was the appointment of aborigines as civil celebrants. Faith Bandler, I recall, was one. (They had only been counted as humans in the census some six years before.)
- His fourth change of direction was the appointment of young people to do ceremonies. Lois D'Arcy was a 26 year old mother of two babies. Carol Ditchburn, now Astbury. was 24.
- His next was that citizens could choose their own celebrant— unheard of until then, both with church and with state.
- His next turnaround, a now obvious truth but still not fully absorbed, was his assertion that celebrating the milestones of life was just as important for secular people as it was for religious people.
- His overwhelming conviction was his belief that culture matters A framework of ceremonies communicating society's best performing and visual arts, is vital to a mentally healthy community.

According to Messenger and D'Arcy (opera.cit), the pioneer civil celebrants knew they were part of a radical and innovative cultural change. As time went on they developed a deeper understanding of the value and purposes of ceremony. They believed they should develop a variety of ceremonies. They further believed that celebrants should pursue excellence and best practice in every ceremony.

To raise the general standard of civil ceremonies, given what they saw as the excessively legal cultural context they had inherited, they encouraged each couple to see more creative possibilities in the ceremony than the two of them might originally have envisaged. In this context the celebrant, as a resource person, needed to educate himself/herself in the artistic treasures of western culture appropriate for ceremony creation i.e. in poetry, prose, music, choreography, storytelling and symbolism i.e. the components of ceremony.

Since the federal government introduced celebrants in 1973, the appointment has been valid at any time, in any place anywhere in Australia. Up to 2013, the Marriage Celebrant Program has enabled over a million couples to be married in civil ceremonies. Celebrants were originally appointed based on geographic location and the researched need for a celebrant in the area. After 1 September 2003 their appointment was dependent on being a bureaucratically approved "fit and proper person". This legalistic approach proved disastrous as too many celebrants were appointed and focus on the value of ceremony was diminished.

== Other Western countries have followed Australia ==
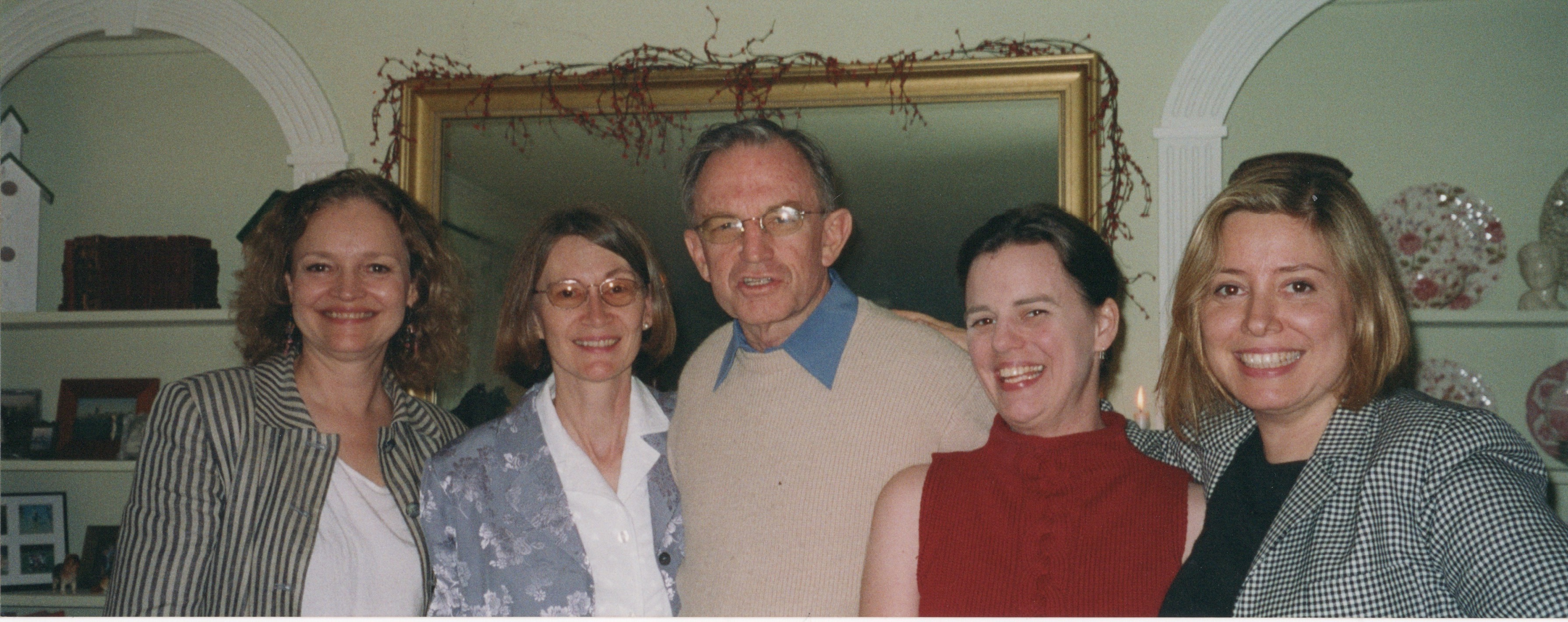
USA Celebrant Foundation Civil Celebrants May 2002 -Remi Bosseau, Gaile Sarma (founder), Dally Messenger III (Australian Trainer), Cindy Reed, Charlotte Eulette

From 19 July 1973 Lionel Murphy and Australia led the Western world in establishing ceremonies of meaning and substance for secular people. New Zealand followed in 1977, then the United Kingdom ca.1980 with Funeral Celebrancy and non-legal wedding ceremonies. The United States in 2002 have followed the Australian model, and have so acknowledged.

== Celebrant civil ceremonies distinct from civil ceremonies of the past ==
The Code of Practice, a section of the Regulations under the Marriage Act 1961, and to which celebrants are legally bound, requires that celebrants help provide a client-centred ceremony. It further recommends the following high standards of ceremonial preparation and delivery:

- a marriage celebrant must recognise the social, cultural and legal significance of marriage and the marriage ceremony...
- a marriage celebrant must maintain a high standard of service in his or her professional conduct and practice...
- a marriage celebrant must respect the importance of the marriage ceremony to the parties and the other persons organising the ceremony...
- give the parties information and guidance to enable them to choose or compose a marriage ceremony that will meet their needs and expectations...
- If requested by the parties conduct a marriage ceremony rehearsal...
- Ensure that his or her personal presentation is of an appropriate standard for the marriage ceremony, and respect the expectations of the parties in relation to the ceremony...
- make efforts to ensure that the marriage ceremony is audible to all those present (using audio equipment, if required)...
- arrive at the venue for the marriage ceremony no later than the time agreed with the parties...
- ensure that the parties to each marriage receive a level of service that meets their separate and special requirements ...
- accept evaluative comment from the parties, and use any comments to improve performance...

This distinguishes the Australian civil marriage celebrant and the countries which follow the Australian model, from previous experiences of civil marriage, or from pre-conceived notions, often held especially in the UK and the US that a civil marriage must be short, dry legal and soul-less.

As is clear from the Australian Code of Practice quoted above, a couple can, and often do, require that their marriage ceremony have all the traditional structure, content, dress, choreography and flow of a formal church ceremony. And originally, civil celebrants were instructed that the readings, ideals, values, vows, music (lyrics) which are expressed, must be secular and non-religious. In April 1976 the Attorney's General's Department instructed civil celebrants as follows:

All celebrants are urged to ensure that the ceremony they use is appropriate for a civil marriage. They are reminded that the service they provide is a secular alternative to religious services which are reserved for church marriages. It would be therefore be out of character for any religious significance to be given to the ceremony. For the same reasons, the conduct of a civil marriage in a church is not encouraged and, understandably, could be the subject of criticism by church authorities and the public generally.

This admonition was repeated over ten years later (September 1986) in virtually the same words.

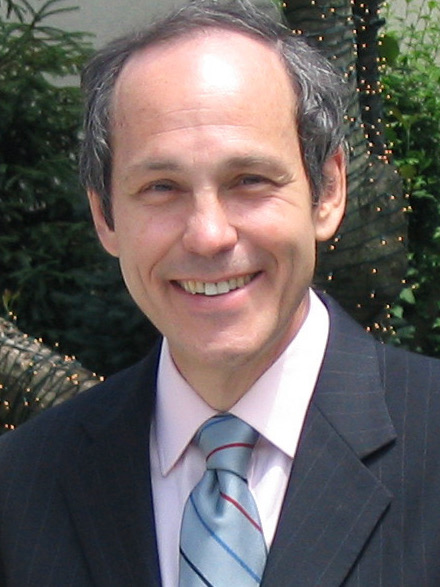
Gerry_Fierst_-_actor_and_celebrant

Dally Messenger III also claims that as the ceremony is either chosen or created by the couple, it can be affirmed as honest and authentic.

Or to give an American perspective on marriage; one which illustrates a reformed view of civil marriage, we need only quote the New Jersey civil marriage celebrant Gerald Fierst:

- A wedding ceremony is a crossroad where two life stories intersect.
- A wedding ceremony takes the two lives that the individuals have travelled and transforms them into a single path upon which each life embarks, starting over.
- A wedding ceremony acknowledges the turning point, the choice to go on.
- It's the setting off on life's journey together, with the experiences of the past as a guide into the future.
- A wedding ceremony is a story which tells the past, proclaims the present, and blesses the future.

Or in the words of Author and Celebrant Wendy Haynes:

When it comes down to it, the jewel in the crown is the wedding ceremony... The purpose of the book is to inspire you, to give you ideas so you can shape the ceremony to fit your life and your commitment to each other.

== Celebrant organisations ==
Lionel Murphy himself founded the first celebrant organisation on 3 May 1974. He called all the celebrants he had appointed to that date to his office in Sydney. He explained to the celebrants who were present that the Labor Party was sure to lose the coming election. Celebrants would need an organisation so that they could speak with one voice, especially if their very existence was threatened by a conservative (Liberal) government. He appointed a well-known model, Jill-Ellen Fuller, as the inaugural president of the Australian Civil Marriage Celebrants Association (ACMCA). He appointed Dally Messenger III as secretary.

A separate organisation for funeral celebrants, the Association of Civil Funeral Celebrants, was formed on 3 May 1977.

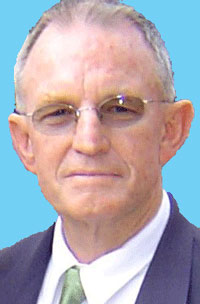
Dally Messenger III is an acknowledged leader in the Civil Celebrant Program in Australia, New Zealand and the US. He was the first person to apply to become a civil celebrant. He has written two influential books, one on secular ceremonies and another on the history of celebrancy. cf. references

Apart from survival, the main activities of the ACMCA became to deal with the media, and to distribute and share (by mail) resources among the celebrants i.e. poems and quotations, for use in ceremonies.

Murphy exempted every civil celebrant from Section 45 of the Australian federal Marriage Act 1961. This is a legal "warning" or monitum to the couple. Murphy believed the words to be sexist and inauthentic – i.e. wrong for not admitting the high rate of divorce.

After several years the ACMCA broke up into state organisations. Other organisations such as the Australian Federation of Civil Celebrants formed (28 January 1994) which admitted marriage, funeral and naming celebrants.

== Fixed-fee period: 1974–1995 ==
Despite a number of difficulties and problems, the civil celebrant program turned out to be hugely popular with the general public. From 1973 to 1995, civil marriages by independent celebrants went from 2.92% of total marriages to 38.5% in 1996.(If one includes Total Civil Marriages i.e. includes civil marriages performed by government "Registry Office" officials, total civil marriages went from 17.92% in 1974 to 46.7% in 1996 The main problem was the fixed fee which, strictly interpreted by Attorney-General's Department ultimately led to a serious decline in standards from which the program has never fully recovered. Once the pioneer celebrants became diluted with new appointments idealism was only sustained by the minority. Attitudes developed with many celebrants which turned out to be very destructive. Realising they received the same remuneration if they spent time and care in the preparation of a marriage, or if they did not, many provided the absolute minimum for the marrying couple. To make matters worse, the fixed fee, in a period of high inflation, declined in value, which further exacerbated the problem.

Many good celebrants were forced out of the field due to the low remuneration. In the context of the fixed fee, those who stayed practising marriage celebrants did far too many marriages to earn enough remuneration for their personal needs. Despite Lionel Murphy's clear declarations to the contrary, some powerful public servants began to classify the office of marriage celebrant as a "community service" which led to a further deterioration of professional standards.

Says Messenger:

the public service and the government had all but destroyed the Civil Marriage Celebrant Program by freezing the fee, forcing down standards and frustrating the good celebrants out of the business.

Despite these debilitating policy initiatives, a minority core of celebrants sustained high standards. The program continued to progress and, at the end of 1995, was very close to becoming the mainstream procedure of contracting marriage.

== Deregulation period: 1995–2003 ==
According to Messenger the period from 1995 to 2003 is recorded as being the most happily productive of the Civil Celebrant Movement in Australia.

Funeral and Naming ceremonies, originally opposed by the majority of celebrants and the Attorney-General's Department, had gradually and imperceptibly become accepted. A group of celebrants under the leadership of Rick Barclay, a successful Funeral and Marriage Celebrant, had morphed the original Funeral Celebrants Association of Australia into an organisation which accepted all ceremonies and celebrants into an inclusive association titled The Institute of Australian Celebrants.

Kathleen Hurley, an active member of the institute, persuaded Dally Messenger III to become more deeply involved. Other activists at this time included Ken Woodburn, Lyn Knorr, Beverley Silvius, Gavan Grosser, Cavell Ferrier and Brian and Tina McInerney. As a group, they decided to escalate the profile of the institute and take a lead in bringing all celebrants together. They also devised a plan for regular meetings and conferences to encourage co-operation, professional development, and to focus on a deeper understanding of the role of the celebrant in society.

Their most important decision was to mount a political and media campaign to abolish the fixed fee, perceived as the cause of the lowest standards since the program was established. With these ends, on 28 January. 1994, the institute became a national organisation, the Australian Federation of Civil Celebrants Inc.

Before challenging government, they campaigned for more members and organised a series meetings and seminars. Shortly after, on 28 March 1994 Dally Messenger, the president of the Australian Federation of Civil Celebrants joined with Robert Ross, secretary of the Association of Civil Marriage Celebrants of Victoria in a meeting with the Honorable Peter Duncan, the assistant minister in charge of celebrants, and asked him for the deregulation of the fee for marriages, and a number of other reforms.

Duncan, after several months of correspondence, responded negatively by appointing 1000 extra celebrants. This provocative action galvanised all eleven celebrant organisations to challenge the government via the media. With the assistance of leading constitutional lawyer, Professor Michael Pryles, and the abovementioned media publicity, the government responded. The fixed fee was de-regulated on 1 July 1995. On 29 & 30 August 1995 the federal government invited representatives of all eleven celebrant organisations to a meeting in Canberra – the National Council of Celebrants. More importantly, a search conference, initiated by public servant, Helen Eastburn, was set up to establish Competency Standards under Jan Wallbridge and Jennifer Rivers of the Canberra Institute of Technology. This occurred on 29 and 30 August 1995 and was followed through and refined in intense correspondence and phone calls to everyone concerned in the weeks following.

A watershed of development and possibly symbolically expressing the most profound maturing within the celebrant movement were the series of conferences held at Pallotti College, Millgrove, northeast of Melbourne from 1994 to 1999. The committee of the Australian Federation of Civil Celebrants decided that the Conferences should explore the nature of celebrancy itself and focus primarily on ceremony and ritual in society.

== Review of 2003: 2003–2013 ==
Graph tracing the success of the civil marriage celebrant program in Australia from 1969 to 2004.Sometime in 1998 Civil weddings became more than 50% of all weddings performed in Australia.

Thirty years later, following an extensive review and the introduction of reforms by the federal Attorney-General Daryl Williams, the marriage celebrant system changed.

Williams promised a new structure and summarised his intentions as follows:

* quality training for celebrants

- a careful selection process for the appointment of marriage celebrants
- a balancing of the number of celebrants appointed
- a Code of Practice which required careful attention to couples and their ceremonial needs
- precise attention to the requirements of laws and procedures.

Since September 2003, prospective marriage celebrants have had to undergo Government-approved accredited training in marriage celebrancy, and meet specific criteria set by the Attorney-General's Department to be declared a "fit and proper person" to hold the office of "marriage celebrant".

In this same month a series of legal and administrative changes to the civil celebrant program were put into effect by the Australian Government. Attorney-General Daryl Williams, who left the Australian Parliament in mid-term had, just before he resigned, approved a number of radical changes to the Marriage Act and the Regulations under the Act (Section 39 as it was, and after 2003). The most important of these was the legal transfer of powers over the program from the Attorney-General to an appointed public servant titled "The Registrar".).

The program, from its beginnings in 1973 had always been referred to as the "Civil Celebrant Program". Under the 2003 changes, all civil celebrant appointments were cancelled, and all civil celebrants to this point were re-appointed by the Registrar, in the same category as clergy of small churches, as "Commonwealth Authorised Celebrants".

New appointments were usually authorised by the Registrar after passing one Unit of Competency, of a since substantially discredited educational system of Nationally Authorised Training.

With a pass in this Unit certified by any Registered Training Organisation, on application to the Registrar, providing the applicant paid attention to the details of the written application, appointment as a Commonwealth Authorised Celebrant was more or less automatic, with the occasional exception.

This system led to a proliferation of celebrants and excessive competition. It also led to a lowering of standards. In 2010, Melbourne journalist Mark Russell noted:

There are thousands of (rookie marriage celebrants) trying to undercut each other in the race down the aisle. Since federal laws were introduced seven years ago dispensing with the policy of appointing celebrants on a needs-only basis ... the number of Celebrants has tripled to more than 10,000 ... many have inadequate training... The number of nuptial nightmares is soaring ... horror stories abound ... inexperienced celebrants have been accused of ruining wedding days because they don't know what they are doing.

The article goes on to list the disastrous experience of many wedding days, the inadequacy of celebrant training, unpredictable cancellations by celebrants, the lowering of planning and rehearsing standards, the indignity of some celebrant advertising material and the "savage" over-competition.

On 15 January 2012, in an open letter to Attorney-General Nicola Roxon, nine senior celebrants protested their grievances at the deterioration of the program in which they had formerly felt pride and achievement. They listed:-

- The downgrading of status by the legal transfer of ministerial authority to a public servant.
- The setback to the high cultural standards they had worked for years to attain.
- The loss of identity in legally excluding the title "civil celebrant".
- The confusion of the general public as to who was a "religious" celebrant and who was not.
- The disrespect shown by the Registrar – especially to those who pioneered the program.
- The excessive number of celebrants and the consequent lowering of standards.

They recommended a policy based on the following principles.

- quality training for celebrants,
- a careful selection process for the appointment of marriage celebrants,
- a balancing of the number of celebrants appointed, and a
- Code of Practice which requires careful attention to couples (and other clients) and their ceremonial needs, and
- precise and correct attention to the requirements of laws and procedures.

=== Statistics ===
Until 2004 the Commonwealth Statistician (ABS-ref) customarily gave statistics for the

- Number of civil marriages by government registry offices
- Number of marriages performed by Independent civil marriage celebrants.
- Number of marriages by each of the major churches and religions.
- Number of marriages by smaller denominations (total).

After 2004 many of these statistics were discontinued. Statistics for the total number and proportion of religious and civil marriages are still published each year, but they do not distinguish between marriages conducted by registry office officials and those conducted by independent marriage celebrants. Similarly, statistics of religious marriages only give separate figures for the two largest denominations, Roman Catholics and Anglicans. Nevertheless, the proportion of couples choosing a civil marriage continued to rise. It was 58.7% in 2004 but 79.7% in 2018 and 80.3% in 2019.

== Celebrant training and education ==
Until 1994, celebrant training was mainly achieved by informal but effective mentoring of new celebrants by the more experienced. This was augmented by seminars and conferences organised by the main celebrant organisations. Significant progress in understanding of the celebrant role was achieved at the annual "Pallotti" live-in conferences which took place at Pallotti College in Warburton, Victoria, from 1994 to 1999. International lecturers included Mary Hancock from New Zealand and David Oldfield from Washington DC in the US.

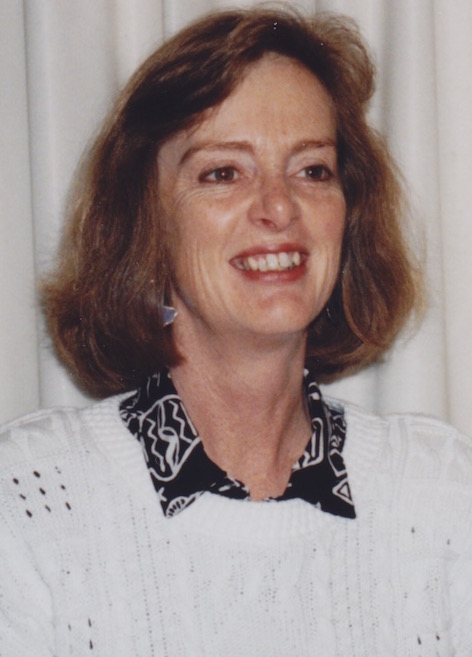
Mary Hancock, pioneer New Zealand civil celebrant (New Zealand adopted the Australian model). Mary Hancock established the first training course for civil celebrants in the world in Auckland New Zealand (c. 1994)

In 1994, the first formal training course for civil celebrants ever established, was created by pioneer civil celebrant Mary Hancock in Auckland, New Zealand. Shortly after, in Australia, the International College of Celebrancy courses were established by Dally Messenger III.

After the changes of 2003, the Australian Government encouraged Registered Training Organisations to teach celebrancy, a system which was open to exploitation by unethical operators and which for civil celebrants, and for many other vocational training courses, proved disastrous.

== Registration ==
Registration provides the legal authority to practice as a marriage celebrant and a four-digit or five-digit alpha-numeric registration number. Once registered (or authorised as it is also known), the marriage celebrant can marry couples in virtually any location (e.g. reception centre "chapels", other deconsecrated chapels and churches, historic buildings, galleries, private homes, parks and gardens, beaches, headlands, boats etc.) and at any time of the day or night. The celebrant is responsible for processing and lodging all legal paperwork to register the marriage in accordance with defined procedures. This gives the Australian civil marriage celebrant more status than they enjoy in other western countries, but also additional legal responsibility.

== Funeral and general celebrants ==
From 1975 a defined group of marriage and non-marriage celebrants declared themselves as funeral celebrants. Many celebrants who are currently awaiting appointment as marriage celebrants and who cannot yet perform marriage ceremonies are practising as general celebrants in the community. Authorised marriage celebrants also frequently offer general celebrant services; but since these services are extra-legal, they may also be conducted on an ad hoc basis by untrained people.

General celebrants perform a range of different extra-legal ceremonies including naming (namegiving) ceremonies; funerals; renewal of wedding vows; anniversaries; significant birthday celebrations; commitment ceremonies for same-sex couples who were forbidden to marry under Australian law (marriage equality became legal in Australia in December 2017), or for heterosexual couples who cannot marry for personal, financial, religious or legal reasons; memorials and or scattering of ashes ceremonies; boat-naming ceremonies; dedication of new home or office ceremonies; graduation ceremonies; naturalisation (citizenship) ceremonies; becoming a teenager (coming of age) and other ceremonies.

== See also ==
- Celebrancy – description of the profession of celebrancy.
- Lionel Murphy – Australian statesman who established civil celebrancy in law and culture.
- Civil funeral celebrant – description, history, ideals and principles of civil funeral celebrancy.
- Dally Messenger III – notable civil celebrant who progressed civil celebrancy in Australia, New Zealand, the United Kingdom the United States and elsewhere.
- Ceremony – an explanation of the components of a ceremony and the skills required (civil and religious).
- Marriage in Australia – summary of the legal status history and organising of marriage in Australia.
- Celebrant Foundation and Institute – information about the pioneer non-profit organisation which established civil celebrants in the US based on the Australian model.
- Officiant – synonym for celebrant.
- Humanist celebrant – describes the work of Humanist Society celebrants throughout the world with an emphasis on the non-religious.
- Marriage officiant – religious and civil marriage celebrants in various religions and countries.
