= Officiant =

Leader of a service or ceremony

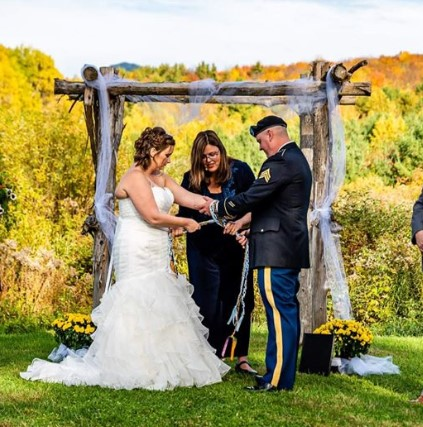
Justice of the Peace performing a hand-fasting ceremony during a wedding

An officiant or celebrant is someone who officiates (i.e. leads) at a religious or secular service or ceremony, such as weddings (marriage officiant), funerals (burial, entombment or cremation) or memorial services, namegiving or baptism.

Religious officiants, commonly referred to as celebrants, are usually ordained by a religious denomination as members of the clergy, and charged with conducting worship services and other religious ceremonies. Some officiants work within congregations in some denominations and for specified ceremonies (e.g., funerals) as non-ordained members on the clergy team. Clergy or officiants differ from chaplains in that the clergy serve the members of their congregation, while chaplains are usually employed by an institution such as the military, a hospital or other health care facility, etc.

Secular officiants include civil celebrants, Humanist celebrants, justices of the peace, marriage commissioners, notaries, and other persons empowered by law to perform ceremonies of legal import. Many secular celebrants conduct the whole range of ceremonies which mark the milestones of human life.

== See also ==
- Civil funeral celebrant
- Celebrant (Australia)
- Self-uniting marriage
