= Ceremony =

Event of ritual significance, performed on a special occasion

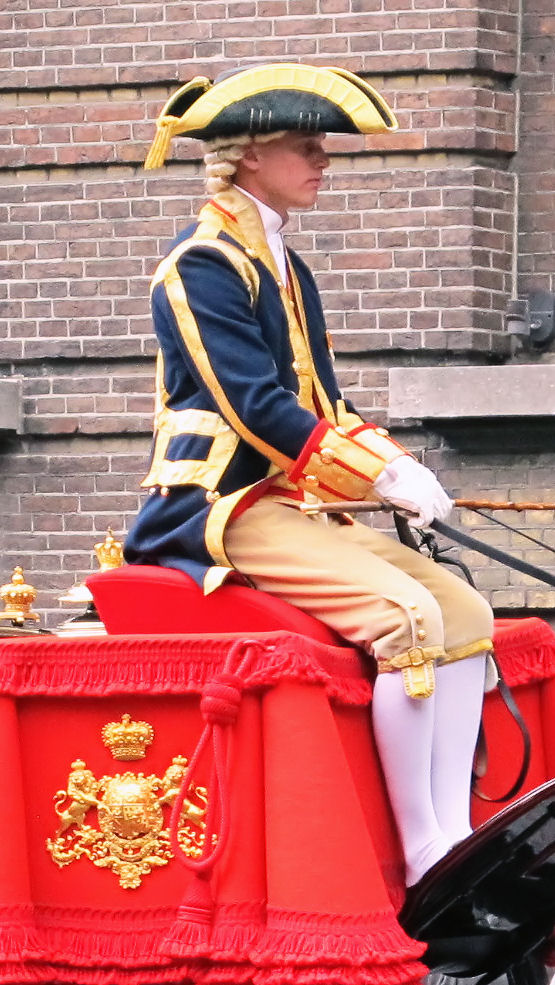
Ceremonial at court during Prinsjesdag

A ceremony (UK: /ˈsɛrəməni/, US: /ˈsɛrəˌmoʊni/) is a unified ritualistic event with a purpose, usually consisting of a number of artistic components, performed on a special occasion.

The word may be of Etruscan origin, via the Latin caerimonia.

== Religious and civil (secular) ceremonies ==
According to Dally Messenger and Alain de Botton, in most Western countries the values and ideals articulated in both church and civil ceremonies are generally similar. The difference is in what Messenger calls the "supernatural infrastructure" or de Botton the "implausible supernatural element".

Most religions claim some extra advantage conferred by the deity, e.g., Roman Catholics believe that through the words of consecration in the mass ceremony, God himself becomes actually present on the altar.

Both religious and civil ceremonies share the powerful psychological, social and cultural influences which all ceremony seeks to attain. The style of music played, words used, other components and the structure vary.

=== Shared traditions ===
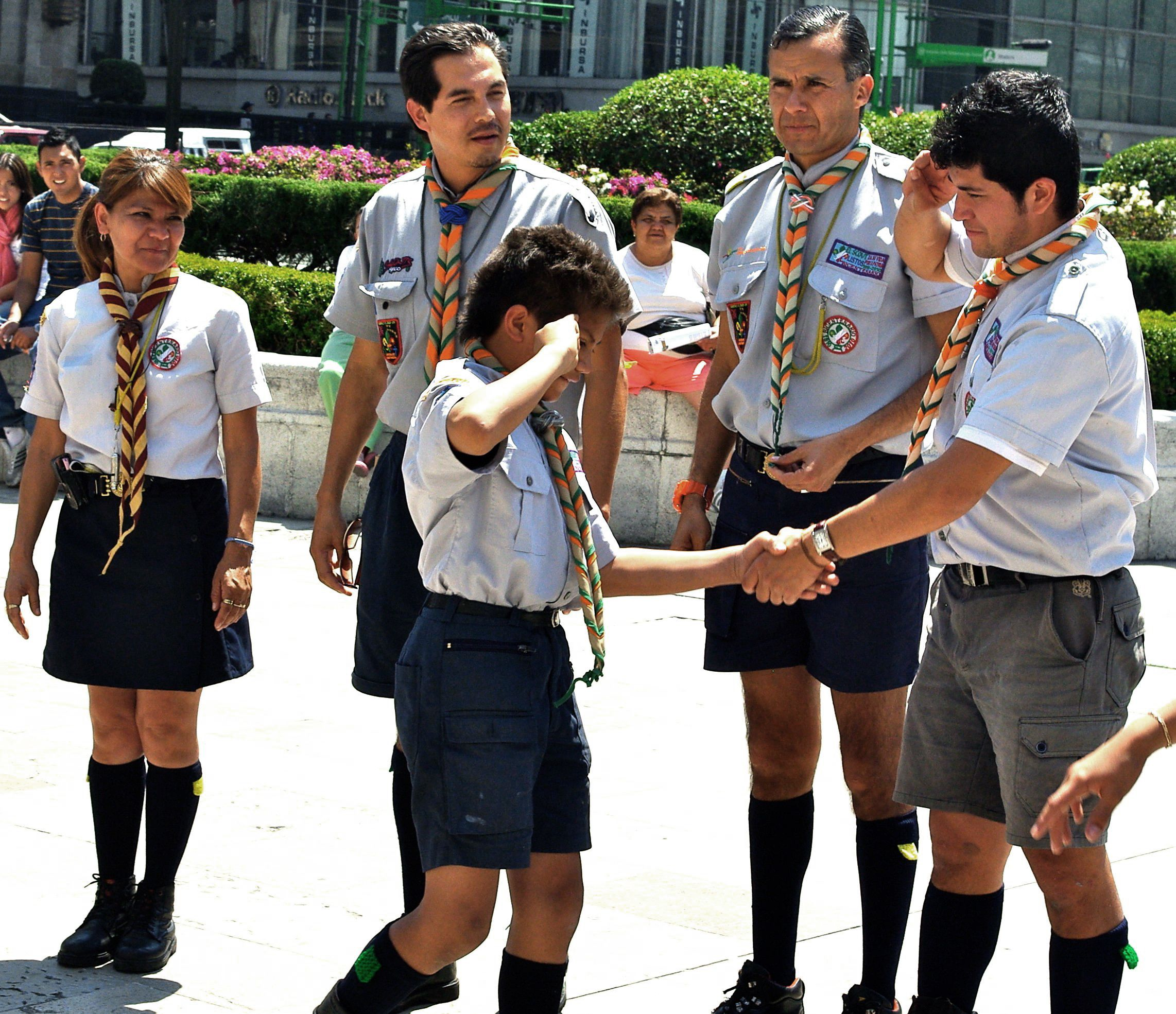
Leaders welcome a boy into Scouting, March 2010, Mexico City, Mexico.

As Edward Schillebeeckx writes about the marriage ceremony, there are a number of ancient traditional elements in both church and civil ceremonies in the western world. Key ceremonies date from the pre-Christian Roman and Greek times, and their practices have continued through the centuries. For example, from pre-Christian Roman times in the marriage ceremony, we inherit best men and bridesmaids, processions, signing of the contract, exchange of rings and the wedding cake.

=== Sharing non-supernatural content ===
Writer and philosopher de Botton maintains atheists should appropriate many of the useful insights, artistic treasures and symbolism inspired by religion. He argues that the secular world can also learn from the religions the importance of community and continuity. Messenger agrees, and points out that the success of civil celebrants in Australia has been partly due to their espousing of these principles, both in theory and practice, since 1973.

== History of secular ceremony ==
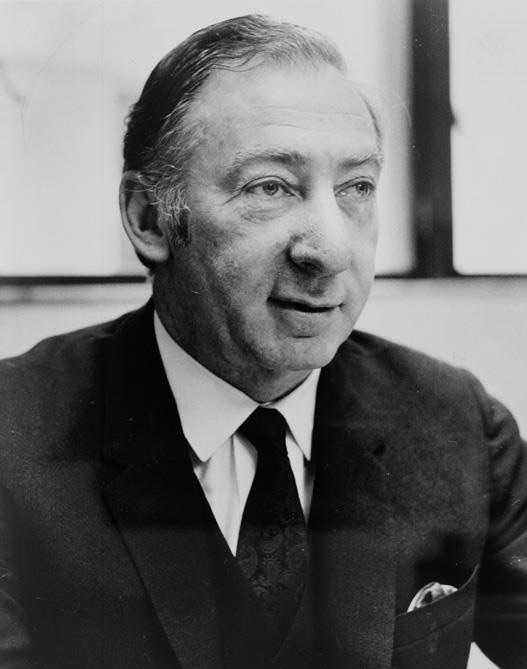
Senator Lionel Murphy, founder of the civil celebrant movement in Australia, which has now spread to the rest of the Western World

The main impetus to the development of quality civil ceremonies in the Western world was the foresight of the Australian statesman, senator and High court judge Lionel Murphy. In 1973, Australia's civil celebrant program entrusted carefully selected individuals with the responsibility of providing non-church people with ceremonies of substance and dignity. This initiative to a great extent has now been largely adopted by New Zealand, Canada, the United Kingdom and some states of the US.

== Purpose of secular ceremony ==
According to Dally Messenger III secular ceremonies are "roadmap" influences which lead to an acceptable, ethical and dignified life. Ceremonies contribute to the unseen ingredients of psychological stability, a sense of identity, reassurances of life's purposes, and the personal sense of self-worth. Murphy considered that personal genuine ceremonies were central to a civilised, stable and happy society. Here he echoed the conviction of the mythologist Joseph Campbell who had maintained the strongly asserted generality that the level of civilised behaviour in a society is directly linked to the practice of ceremonies and rites of passage.

In addition, Messenger makes the following statements:

- A complex of good ceremonies raise the level of human happiness in society.
- Ceremonies assist humans to adjust to change.
- Ceremonies are signposts of the culture and indicate that such a culture has life-affirming substance.
- Ceremonies are an important means of expressing, reinforcing and transmitting values.
- Ceremonies are constructed from the visual and performing arts. In a chosen setting they are an important vehicle for telling stories, reciting poetry and prose, using symbolism, and performing music.
- Ceremonies, done well, leave lifelong lasting memories and therefore permanent good effects.
- The better a ceremony is done, the better its psychological, cultural, and social outcomes.

== Components of ceremony ==
To be powerful and effective, such ceremonies, in the view of all the scholars in the field, had to have impact. This occurred when the ceremony was framed by the visual and performing arts. Great care had to be taken in creating and choosing the poetry, prose, stories, personal journeys, myths, silences, dance, music and song, shared meditations, choreography and symbolism which comprised a ceremony. To reinforce the psychological and cultural power of ceremony it should be enacted, as far as possible, in a beautiful interior and exterior place. Beauty is the essential core of ceremony, having always been part of "raising the spirit" and embedding the good in the memory.

Ceremonies, as they always had been, are historically the bridge between the visual and performing arts and the people. Murphy and his followers, and international practitioners such as David Oldfield of Washington DC understand that ceremonies are core expressions of the culture. Done well, they can assist in major decision-making, bring emotional security, strengthen bonds between people, and communicate a sense of contentment. To quote David Oldfield:

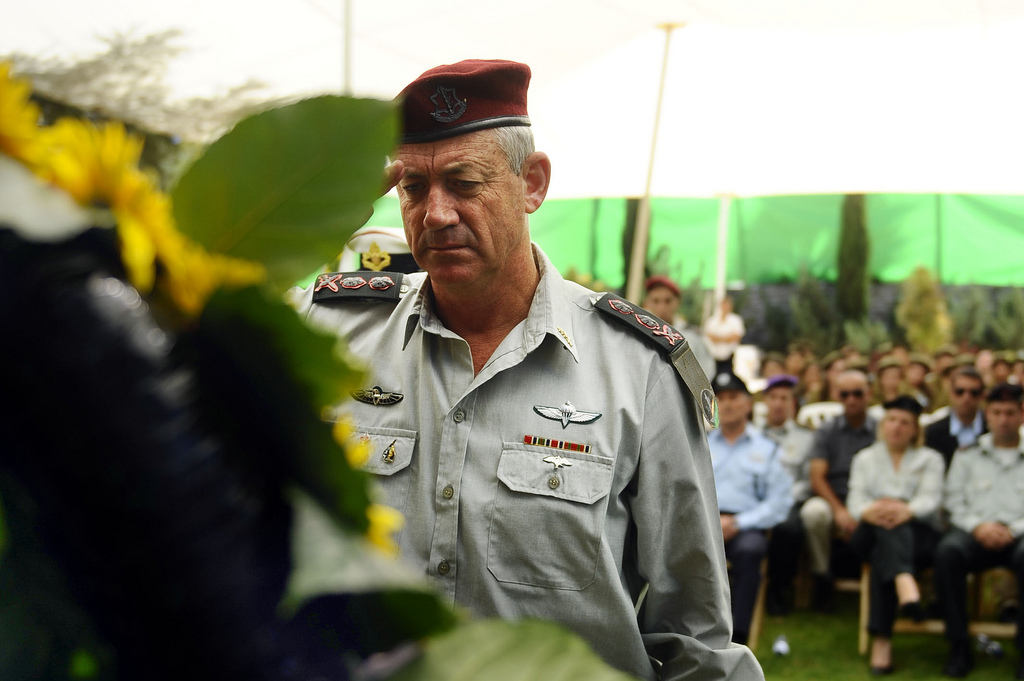
Israel Defense Forces Chief of Staff Lt. Gen. Benny Gantz salutes Yom Kippur War casualties at an official annual memorial service.

Rituals and ceremonies are an essential and basic means

for human beings to give themselves and others

the necessary messages

which enable the individual to stay human.

They communicate acceptance,

love, a sense of identity, esteem,

shared values and beliefs

and shared memorable events.

Every ritual contains tender and sacred moments.

And in those moments of sensitivity

We are taken out of the normal flow of life,

And out of our routines.

We are then in an event

that is irreplaceable and sacred.

In ritual we participate in

something deep and significant.

They are moments which move our heart

And touch our spirit.

== Qualities of a celebrant ==
Lionel Murphy also knew that the superficial, the unaware, were not the right persons to bring this about. The civil celebrant needs to have a rich skill-set and knowledge base. Murphy is on the record as asserting that the civil celebrant needed to have a "feel" for ceremony and be professional, knowledgeable, educated, creative, imaginative, inspired, well presented, idealistic, and well practised.

The civil celebrant should be a person inspired to improve lives at a deep and lasting level. For this reason they must be carefully chosen. The ideal is that they be educated in the humanities and trained to expertly co-create, creatively write and perform ceremonies.

== Ceremonial occasions ==
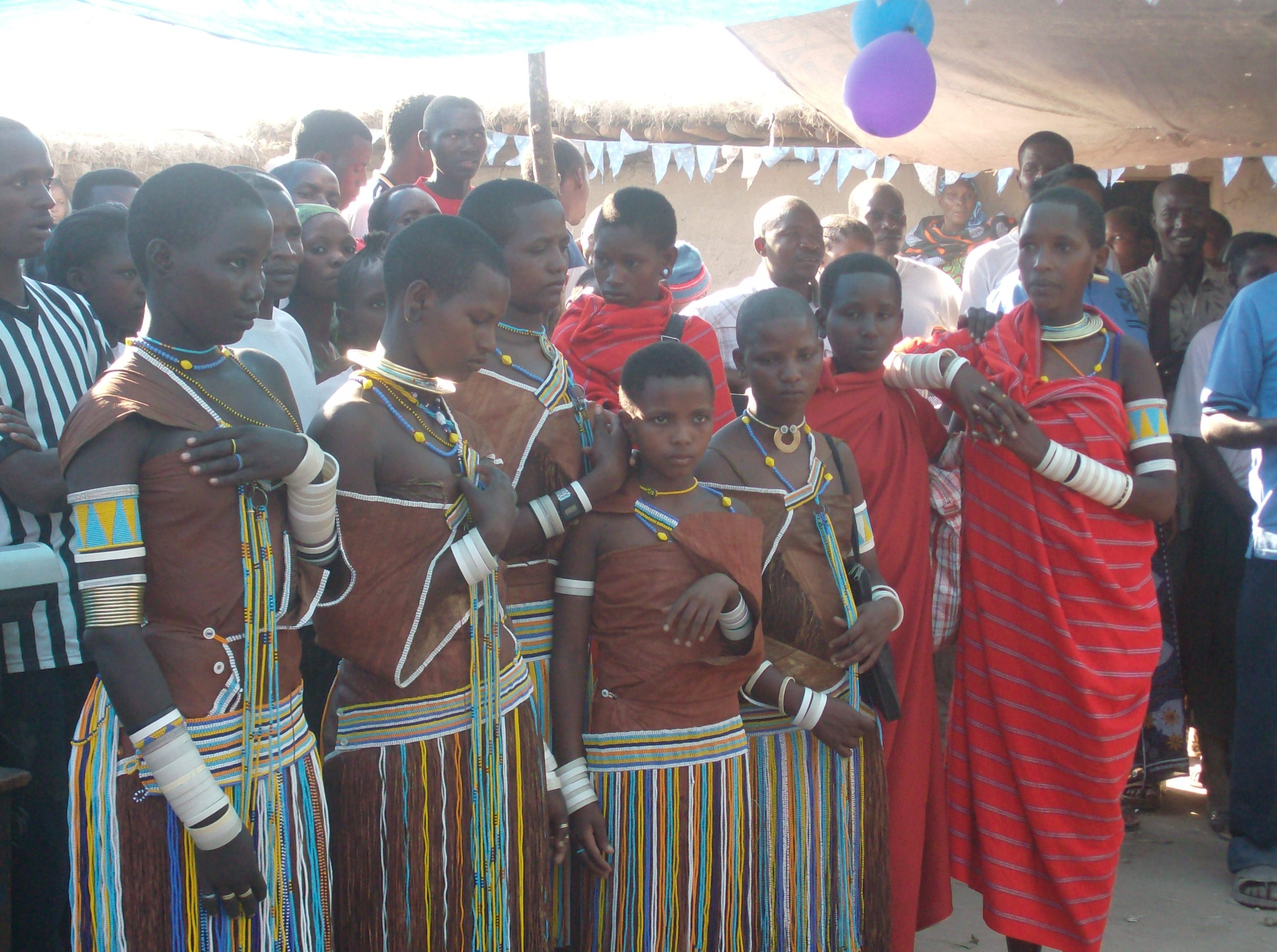
Gogo tribe ladies from Manyoni Tanzania waiting to perform traditional dance during the ceremony of priest Joseph Makasi ordination

- Marriage, or a wedding, is the flagship ceremony of every culture.
- Almost as important is the funeral or burial ceremony.

The funeral ritual, too, is a public, traditional and symbolic means of expressing our beliefs, thoughts and feelings about the death of someone loved. Rich in history and rife with symbolism, the funeral ceremony helps us acknowledge the reality of the death, gives testimony to the life of the deceased, encourages the expression of grief in a way consistent with the culture's values, provides support to mourners, allows for the embracing of faith and beliefs about life and death, and offers continuity and hope for the living.

- Birth, i.e. a naming ceremony

Naming Ceremonies existed in human culture long before Christianity or any of the major religions came on the scene. Every community has a ceremony to welcome a new child into the world, to give that child recognition, and to celebrate the birth of new life.

- Baptism or christening ceremony
- Initiation (college orientation week)
- Puberty
- Social adulthood (Bar (or Bat) Mitzvah), coming of age ceremonies
- Graduation
- Award ceremonies
- Retirement
- Death (Day of the Dead)
- Spiritual (baptism, communion)
- Grand opening
- Aging
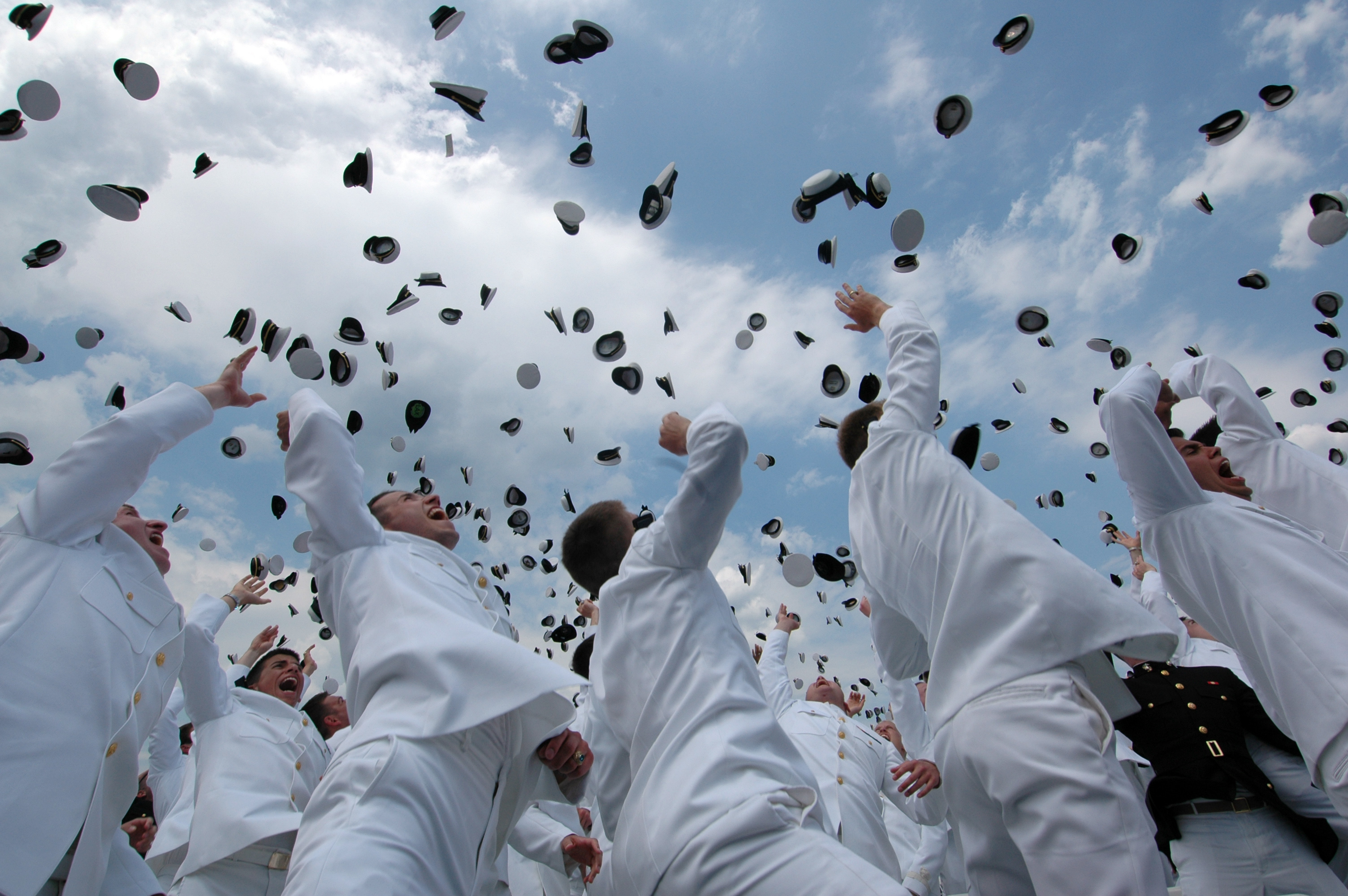
  Newly commissioned officers celebrate their new positions by throwing their midshipmen covers into the air as part of the U.S. Naval Academy class of 2005 graduation and commissioning ceremony.

== Celebration of events ==
Other, society-wide ceremonies may mark annual or seasonal or recurrent events such as:

- Vernal equinox, winter solstice and other annual astronomical positions
- Weekly Sabbath day
- Inauguration of an elected office-holder
- Occasions in a liturgical year or "feasts" in a calendar of saints
- Opening and closing of a sports event, such as the Olympic Games

Other ceremonies underscore the importance of non-regular special occasions, such as:

- Coronation of a monarch
- Victory in battle

In some Asian cultures, ceremonies also play an important social role, for example the tea ceremony.

== Process ==
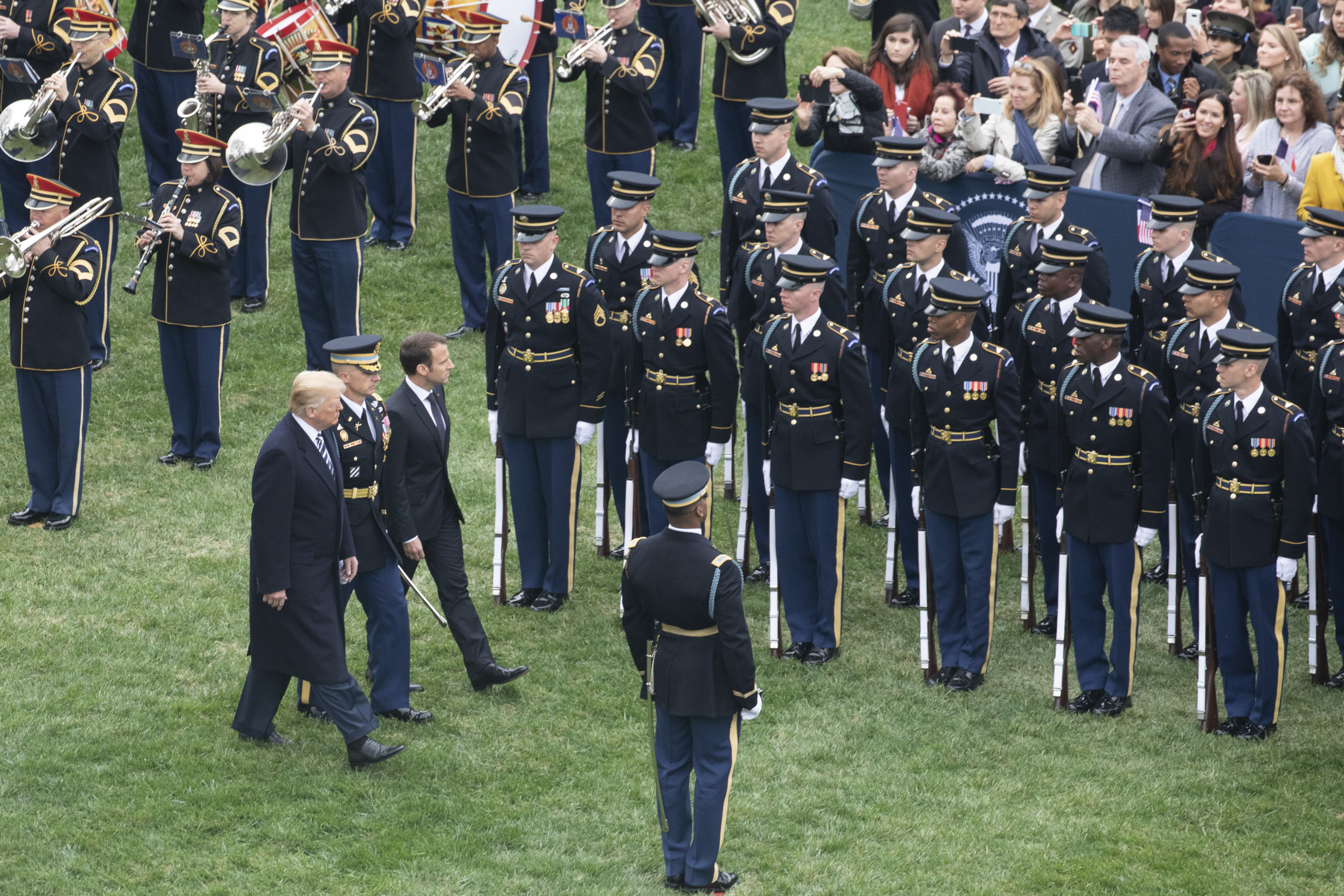
A state arrival ceremony in the United States.

Ceremonies may have a physical display or theatrical component: dance, a procession, the laying on of hands. A declaratory verbal pronouncement may explain or cap the occasion, for instance:

- I now pronounce you husband and wife.
- I swear to serve and defend the nation ...
- I declare open the games of ...
- I/We dedicate this ... ... to ...

Both physical and verbal components of a ceremony may become part of a liturgy.

== See also ==
- Religion for Atheists: A non-believer's guide to the uses of religion – 2012 book by Alain de Botton which argues that while supernatural claims made by religion are false, some aspects of religion are still useful and can be applied in secular life and society.
- Builders' rites – Ceremonies associated with construction
- Ceremonial dance – Use of dance in religious ceremonies and rituals
- Ceremonial magic – Variety of rituals of magic
- Ceremonial weapon – Object used for ceremonial displays of power or authority
- Cornerstone – First stone set in construction of a masonry foundation
- Event planning – Purposeful and systematic planning of public events
- Gift – Item given to someone without the expectation of anything in return
- Groundbreaking – Ceremony on the first day of construction
- Human condition – Ultimate concerns of human existence
- Liturgy – Customary public worship performed by a religious group
- Opening ceremony – Official opening of a building or event
- Ribbon cutting ceremony – Official opening of a building or event
- Rite of passage – Ritual reflecting change of social status
- Tjurunga – Object of religious significance to some Central Australian Aboriginal people
- Topping out – Builders' rite when the last beam (or equivalent) is placed
- Worship – Act of religious devotion
