= Dally Messenger III =

Australian developer (born 1938)

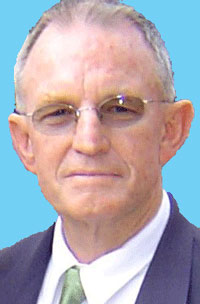
- Civil celebrant, author
- Born: 4 February 1938 (age 88); Kensington, New South Wales, Australia
- Education: STB (philosophy and theology), LCP (Licentiate of the College of Teachers: London)
- Alma mater: University of Melbourne
- Spouse: Remi Messenger
- Children: 3 including Natasha and Julia
- Relatives: Dally Messenger (grandfather)
- Writing career
- Notable awards: National Dance Award
- Website: Personal website

Dally Messenger III (born 4 February 1938) is an Australian author and civil celebrancy advocate associated with the program of civil marriages introduced by former Attorney-General Lionel Murphy. Ordained as a Roman Catholic priest, he left the priesthood in 1968 and subsequently taught at Haileybury College from 1969 to 1975. He later became active in public commentary and publishing, contributing to The Australian, Radio Australia, and Nation Review. He was also a founder and foundation editor of Dance Australia magazine. His books address topics including ballet and dance, rugby league, children of separated parents, early Melbourne radio broadcasting, celebrant ceremony design, and the history of the celebrant movement.

== Family background ==
Dally Raymond Messenger (known as Dally Messenger III) is a descendant of a prominent Anglo-Australian sporting family. He is the grandson of Dally Messenger, a dual-code rugby international and a foundational figure in Australian rugby league. The family's sporting legacy began in professional rowing and boat-building, originating with his great-great-grandfather, James Messenger. Based on the River Thames, James Messenger was a master boat-builder who served as the Queen’s Waterman and Barge Master to Queen Victoria. He held the world sculling championship from 1854 to 1857. His great-grandfather, Charles Amos Messenger achieved several sculling titles, including the championship of Victoria (1878) and New Zealand (1881). In 1887, he challenged for the world sculling championship but was unsuccessful. Charles Amos was also responsible for establishing the first boatshed on Sydney Harbour at Balmain, which he later moved to Double Bay.

== Early life and education ==
Born in Sydney in February 1938, Dally Messenger III is the son of Dally Messenger Junior and Dorothy (née Davidson). His upbringing took place in Sydney, with most of his school years spent in Katoomba in the Blue Mountains at St Bernard's College. He completed his final year of secondary schooling at Marist Brothers, Parramatta. Subsequently, he worked in banking and wholesale for several years before entering a seminary at the age of twenty-one, beginning his studies for the Catholic priesthood at St Columba's College, Springwood, NSW, and later completing them at St Patrick's College, Manly.

Messenger earned his degree (Sacrae Theologiae Baccalaureus (STB)) in 1964, along with teaching qualifications in 1965, before being ordained a priest in 1966. During the post-Vatican II era of upheaval in the Catholic Church, Messenger was an activist. Regarding celibacy of the clergy, Messenger's argument was that, as the right to marry was inalienable ("nullo modo emancipari possit"), the law that forbade clergy in the Latin rite to marry was invalid.

Messenger was involved in the establishment of the New Earth Credit Union aimed at supporting former clergy through low-interest loans. Following his departure from the priesthood, Messenger relocated to Melbourne, where he dedicated six years (1969-1975) to teaching at the Presbyterian Haileybury College. During this period, he married and became the father of three daughters. In 1976, Messenger achieved a post-graduate diploma in Librarianship (teacher-librarian) from the Melbourne State College.

== Dance Australia Magazine ==
Messenger was the founding editor and publisher of Dance Australia magazine, established in 1980. The publication was developed in collaboration with then voluntary contributors including Brian McInerney, Marjorie Messenger (children's editor), Dennis Ogden (design), Jean Nugent (office management), Russell Naughton (photography), June Joubert (illustration), Robyn Summers (public relations), Ted Pask (history features), Patricia Laughlin (reviewer and writer), Dawn Dickson (office management), and Campbell Smith (relief editor, art and design). Early voluntary contributors included writers Blazenka Brysha and André L'Estrange, and photographer Jeff Busby. Messenger received national recognition for his work with Dance Australia. In 1997 he was awarded for services to dance at the inaugural Australian Dance Awards, held at the Sydney Opera House. Following the award, tributes to Messenger were published in Dance Australia by figures including Keith Bain, Noel Pelly, Vicki Fairfax, Alan Brissenden, and Pamela Ruskin. He received a further Australian Dance Award in 2008 for outstanding achievement in dance education, presented at the Arts Centre Melbourne.In an article published for the magazine’s 25th anniversary, and in a recent issue (No.249 October 2025) Messenger related the challenges involved in establishing Dance Australia and its role in documenting developments in Australian dance. As of 2023, Dance Australia is published by Yaffa Publishing of Sydney, which acquired the magazine circa 1990.

== Civil celebrant ==
Messenger has been involved in the civil celebrant program, initially within Australia and subsequently in other English-speaking countries. On 26 January 1970, Messenger was the first individual to apply for the position of a Civil Marriage Celebrant under the provisions outlined in the Marriage Act 1961. In the 1970s, he was an advocate for civil marriage reform, supporting the Whitlam government's Attorney-General Lionel Murphy who, on 26 July 1973, by appointing Lois D'Arcy, had introduced civil marriage celebrants into the Australian cultural scene. Messenger was appointed as a Civil Marriage Celebrant by Murphy in February 1974. Murphy appointed him first secretary of the Association of Civil Marriage Celebrants of Australia.

Messenger was a founder and inaugural president of Funeral Celebrants Association of Australia. In January 1994 he was elected the foundation president of the Australian Federation of Civil Celebrants Inc who, on 26 May 1996, honoured him with life membership.

Messenger was prosecuted for violating Victorian consumer law, accused of attempting to manipulate the fees charged by civil celebrants for funeral services. Messenger contended that his intention was not to fix fees but to pressure funeral directors into raising the fixed fees established through long-standing collaboration among themselves. In 2007, he pleaded guilty to attempting to induce individuals to contravene section 45(2)(a)(ii) of the Competition Code of Victoria and was fined $46,000, in addition to covering his own legal costs amounting to $20,000. Messenger and his supporters persist in asserting that the Australian public is poorly served by a system that grants funeral directors significant control over the conditions and compensation of celebrants.

Messenger was an early advocate for the legalisation of same-sex marriages. As early as 1979, he introduced commitment ceremonies for same-sex couples.

In the 1990s Dally Messenger was active in spreading the civil celebrancy movement to New Zealand and the UK, countries where it was less well established. He was invited to New Zealand as guest keynote speaker at three annual conventions in the 1990s and in 2000. These were in Christchurch, organised by celebrant Frank Crean on 27 June 1998; in Hamilton, organised by celebrant Yvonne Foreman on 23 July 1999 and in Auckland, organised by celebrant Sherryl Wilson on 27 July 2001.

In 2000 to 2002, Messenger was the key training instructor in establishing civil celebrancy in the US. He gave the launching address to the newly formed Celebrant USA Foundation in New Jersey on 5 June 2002 at the Montclair Library.

In 1995 he established the International College of Celebrancy. Messenger has often been a critic of bureaucrats in the Australian Attorney-General's department who tried to reduce the training requirements for persons appointed as celebrants.

Messenger lives in Melbourne with his wife since 2005, Remi Barclay Messenger(née Barclay, a.k.a. Bosseau), a civil celebrant originally from the USA.

== Honours ==
May 1996, Life Member of the Australian Federation of Civil Celebrants as the “celebrant who has contributed most to the civil celebrant program since its inception” (Melbourne)

On 8 May 2014, Messenger was made a Life Member of the Celebrants and Celebrations Network in recognition of his services to celebrants. The citation with this life membership refers to Messenger as "The Don of Celebrancy" and refers to "his unique contribution to the development of civil celebrancy in the Western World."

== Books ==
- Ceremonies for Today, Zouch, Melbourne, 1979. ISBN 0-908036-01-9.
- Ceremonies and Celebrations: Vows, Tributes and Readings, Hachette-Livre, Sydney, 2003. ISBN 978-0-7336-2317-2
- So Mum and Dad have Separated, Listen & Learn, Melbourne, 1994. ISBN 0-646-17458-4
- Being a Chum was Fun, Listen & Learn Melbourne, Melbourne, 1979. ISBN 0-9596136-1-7
- The Master: The Story of H.H. “Dally” Messenger, and the Beginning of Australian Rugby League. Angus & Robertson, Sydney, 1982. ISBN -0-207-14731-0
- The Master: The Life and Times of Dally Messenger, Australia's First Sporting Superstar, (with Sean Fagan), Hachette-Livre, Sydney, 2007. ISBN 978-0-7336-2200-7
- Murphy's Law and the Pursuit of Happiness: A History of the Civil Celebrant Movement. Spectrum Publications, Melbourne, 2012.

ISBN 978-0-86786-169-3

- Dally Messenger: The Beginning of Rugby League, self-published, Melbourne, 2026. ISBN 979-88-98328-65-8
