= Atheist Mind Humanist Heart =

2014 book by Lex Bayer

Atheist Mind, Humanist Heart: Rewriting the Ten Commandments for the Twenty-first Century
- Author: Lex Bayer, John Figdor
- Cover artist: Isaac Tobin
- Language: English
- Subject: Humanism, Atheism, Morality, Secular ethics, Science of morality
- Publisher: Rowman & Littlefield
- Publication date: 2014-09-26
- Publication place: United States
- Media type: Print (Hardcover), ebook, Audiobook
- Pages: 188
- ISBN: 978-1442236790

Atheist Mind, Humanist Heart: Rewriting the Ten Commandments for the Twenty-first Century is a 2014 book by Lex Bayer and Humanist Chaplain, John Figdor, that has been described as a manual for working out one’s own epistemological and secular ethical beliefs. The book sets out to address what the authors see as a need among a growing number of Americans to talk about their beliefs, and lead happy and moral lives when they don't believe in gods or aren't comfortable with religion. It offers a clear set of constructive, positive principles to live by for agnostics, atheists, humanists and non-religious.

The authors produce a personal list of ten “non-commandments”, although readers are consistently advised to treat these as debatable illustrations, rather than as a completed non-theist moral framework. To further this point, the authors organized the Rethink Prize: a crowdsourcing competition to create a secular alternative to the Ten Commandments. The contest drew more than 2,800 submissions from 18 countries and 27 U.S. states. Winners were selected by a panel of judges.

== The Ten Non-Commandments ==
The authors personal list of ten “non-commandments”

1. The world is real, and our desire to understand the world is the basis for belief.
2. We can perceive the world only through our human senses.
3. We use rational thought and language as tools for understanding the world.
4. All truth is proportional to the evidence.
5. There is no God.
6. We all strive to live a happy life. We pursue things that make us happy and avoid things that do not.
7. There is no universal moral truth. Our experiences and preferences shape our sense of how to behave.
8. We act morally when the happiness of others makes us happy.
9. We benefit from living in, and supporting, an ethical society.
10. All our beliefs are subject to change in the face of new evidence, including these.

== The New Ten Commandments for the 21st Century ==
The ten winning beliefs of the Rethink Prize, a crowdsourcing competition to create a secular alternative to the Ten Commandments

1. Be open-minded and be willing to alter your beliefs with new evidence.
2. Strive to understand what is most likely to be true, not to believe what you wish to be true.
3. The scientific method is the most reliable way of understanding the natural world.
4. Every person has the right to control of their body.
5. God is not necessary to be a good person or to live a full and meaningful life.
6. Be mindful of the consequences of all your actions and recognize that you must take responsibility for them.
7. Treat others as you would want them to treat you, and can reasonably expect them to want to be treated. Think about their perspective.
8. We have the responsibility to consider others, including future generations.
9. There is no one right way to live.
10. Leave the world a better place than you found it.
