= Alternatives to the Ten Commandments =

Several alternatives to the Ten Commandments have been promulgated by different persons and groups, which intended to improve on the lists of laws known as the Ten Commandments that appear in the Bible.

== Examples ==
=== Bertrand Russell (1951) ===
Bertrand Russell was a British philosopher, logician, mathematician, historian, writer, social critic, political activist, and Nobel laureate. He formulated these ten commandments:

1. Do not feel absolutely certain of anything.
2. Do not think it worthwhile to proceed by concealing evidence, for the evidence is sure to come to light.
3. Never try to discourage thinking for you are sure to succeed.
4. When you meet with opposition, even if it should be from your husband or your children, endeavour to overcome it by argument and not by authority, for a victory dependent upon authority is unreal and illusory.
5. Have no respect for the authority of others, for there are always contrary authorities to be found.
6. Do not use power to suppress opinions you think pernicious, for if you do the opinions will suppress you.
7. Do not fear to be eccentric in opinion, for every opinion now accepted was once eccentric.
8. Find more pleasure in intelligent dissent than in passive agreement, for, if you value intelligence as you should, the former implies a deeper agreement than the latter.
9. Be scrupulously truthful, even if the truth is inconvenient, for it is more inconvenient when you try to conceal it.
10. Do not feel envious of the happiness of those who live in a fool's paradise, for only a fool will think that it is happiness.

=== Ten Commandments of Socialist Morality and Ethics (1958) ===
The Ten Commandments of Socialist Morality and Ethics (German: Zehn Gebote der sozialistischen Moral und Ethik), also known as Ten Commandments for the New Socialist Man (German: 10 Gebote für den neuen sozialistischen Menschen), were proclaimed by Walter Ulbricht, then First Secretary of the Socialist Unity Party of Germany (SED) in 1958. Formally based on the biblical Ten Commandments, they summarized the political duties of every citizen of the German Democratic Republic (GDR).

1. You should always stand up for the international solidarity of the working class and all working people and for the unbreakable solidarity of all socialist countries.
2. You should love your fatherland and always be ready to use all your strength and ability to defend the workers' and peasants' power.
3. You should help to eliminate the exploitation of man by man.
4. You should do good deeds for socialism, because socialism leads to a better life for all working people.
5. You should act in the spirit of mutual help and comradely cooperation in building socialism, respect the collective and take its criticism to heart.
6. You should protect and increase the public property.
7. You should always strive to improve your performance, be thrifty and consolidate socialist labor discipline.
8. You should educate your children in the spirit of peace and socialism to be well-educated, strong-willed and physically strong people.
9. You should live clean and decent and respect your family.
10. You should show solidarity with the peoples struggling for national liberation and those defending their national independence.

=== Anton LaVey (1967) ===
Anton LaVey was an American author, musician, and occultist. He was the founder of the Church of Satan and LaVeyan Satanism and published "The Eleven Satanic Rules of the Earth":

1. Do not give opinions or advice unless you are asked.
2. Do not tell your troubles to others unless you are sure they want to hear them.
3. When in another's lair, show them respect or else do not go there.
4. If a guest in your lair annoys you, treat him cruelly and without mercy.
5. Do not make sexual advances unless you are given the mating signal.
6. Do not take that which does not belong to you unless it is a burden to the other person and they cry out to be relieved.
7. Acknowledge the power of magic if you have employed it successfully to obtain your desires. If you deny the power of magic after having called upon it with success, you will lose all you have obtained.
8. Do not complain about anything to which you need not subject yourself.
9. Do not harm little children.
10. Do not kill non-human animals unless you are attacked or for your food.
11. When walking in open territory, bother no one. If someone bothers you, ask them to stop. If they do not stop, destroy them.

=== Summum (1975) ===
Summum is an informal gathering of people registered as a tax exempt organization in the state of Utah, U.S., in 1975.

Summum contradicts the historical Biblical account of the Ten Commandments by claiming that, before returning with the Commandments, Moses descended from Mount Sinai with a first set of tablets inscribed with seven principles they call aphorisms.

According to the group, the seven principles are:

1. SUMMUM is MIND, thought; the universe is a mental creation.
2. As above, so below; as below, so above.
3. Nothing rests; everything moves; everything vibrates.
4. Everything is dual; everything has an opposing point; everything has its pair of opposites; like and unlike are the same; opposites are identical in nature, but different in degree; extremes bond; all truths are but partial truths; all paradoxes may be reconciled.
5. Everything flows out and in; everything has its season; all things rise and fall; the pendulum swing expresses itself in everything; the measure of the swing to the right is the measure of the swing to the left; rhythm compensates.
6. Every cause has its effect; every effect has its cause; everything happens according to Law; Chance is just a name for Law not recognized; there are many fields of causation, but nothing escapes the Law of Destiny.
7. Gender is in everything; everything has its masculine and feminine principles; Gender manifests on all levels.

=== George Carlin (2001) ===
George Carlin was an American stand-up comedian, social critic, actor and author.

In his twelfth HBO stand-up comedy special Complaints and Grievances, Carlin reduces the Ten Commandments to three:

1. Thou shalt always be honest and faithful, especially to the provider of thy nookie.
2. Thou shalt try real hard not to kill anyone – unless, of course, they pray to a different invisible man from the one you pray to.
3. Thou shalt keep thy religion to thyself.

=== Ten Offers of Evolutionary Humanism (2005) ===
In his 2005 book Manifesto of Evolutionary Humanism German philosopher Michael Schmidt-Salomon devised "The Ten Offers of Evolutionary Humanism". In short, they read as follows:

1. Serve neither foreign nor familiar "gods" but rather the great ideal of ethics to lessen the suffering in the world. To possess science, philosophy and art means not to need religion!
2. Behave fairly to your neighbour and also to those farthest away!
3. Have no fear of authorities, but rather the courage to reason for yourself!
4. You shall not lie, cheat, steal or kill – unless, in an emergency, there is no other way of asserting the ideals of humanity!
5. Free yourself from the bad habit of moralizing!
6. Do not immunize yourself against criticism!
7. Do not be too confident! But even doubt should be doubted!
8. Overcome any tendency towards tradition blindness by informing yourself in depth from all sides before making a decision!
9. Enjoy your life because it is highly probable that it will be the only one you have!
10. Put your life in the service of a "greater cause", become a part of the tradition of those who desire(d) to make the world a better place in which to live.

=== Richard Dawkins, citing Adam Lee (2006) ===
Richard Dawkins is an English ethologist, evolutionary biologist, and author. These are the alternative to the Ten Commandments written by blogger Adam Lee, cited by Dawkins in his book The God Delusion:

1. Do not do to others what you would not want them to do to you.
2. In all things, strive to cause no harm.
3. Treat your fellow human beings, your fellow living things, and the world in general with love, honesty, faithfulness and respect.
4. Do not overlook evil or shrink from administering justice, but always be ready to forgive wrongdoing freely admitted and honestly regretted.
5. Live life with a sense of joy and wonder.
6. Always seek to be learning something new.
7. Test all things; always check your ideas against the facts, and be ready to discard even a cherished belief if it does not conform to them.
8. Never seek to censor or cut yourself off from dissent; always respect the right of others to disagree with you.
9. Form independent opinions on the basis of your own reason and experience; do not allow yourself to be led blindly by others.
10. Question everything.

Dawkins uses these proposed commandments to make a larger point that "it is the sort of list that any ordinary, decent person today would come up with". He then adds four more of his own devising:

- Enjoy your own sex life (so long as it damages nobody else) and leave others to enjoy theirs in private whatever their inclinations, which are none of your business.
- Do not discriminate or oppress on the basis of sex, race or (as far as possible) species.
- Do not indoctrinate your children. Teach them how to think for themselves, how to evaluate evidence, and how to disagree with you.
- Value the future on a timescale longer than your own.

=== The Decalogue of Pope John XXIII (2006) ===
1. Only for today, I will seek to live the livelong day positively without wishing to solve the problems of my life all at once.
2. Only for today, I will take the greatest care of my appearance: I will dress modestly; I will not raise my voice; I will be courteous in my behavior; I will not criticize anyone; I will not claim to improve or to discipline anyone except myself.
3. Only for today, I will be happy in the certainty that I was created to be happy, not only in the other world but also in this one.
4. Only for today, I will adapt to circumstances, without requiring all circumstances to be adapted to my own wishes.
5. Only for today, I will devote ten minutes of my time to some good reading, remembering that just as food is necessary to the life of the body, so good reading is necessary to the life of the soul.
6. Only for today, I will do one good deed and not tell anyone about it.
7. Only for today, I will do at least one thing I do not like doing; and if my feelings are hurt, I will make sure that no one notices.
8. Only for today, I will make a plan for myself: I may not follow it to the letter, but I will make it. And I will be on guard against two evils: hastiness and indecision.
9. Only for today, I will firmly believe, despite appearances, that the good providence of God cares for me as no one else who exists in this world.
10. Only for today, I will have no fears. In particular, I will not be afraid to enjoy what is beautiful and to believe in goodness. Indeed, for twelve hours I can certainly do what might cause me consternation were I to believe I had to do it all my life.

To conclude: here is an all-embracing resolution: "I want to be kind, today and always, to everyone."

=== Christopher Hitchens (2010) ===
Christopher Hitchens was an English American author, columnist, essayist, orator, religious and literary critic, social critic, and journalist.

His new Ten Commandments are:

1. Do not condemn people on the basis of their ethnicity or their color.
2. Do not ever even think of using people as private property, or as owned, or as slaves.
3. Despise those who use violence or the threat of it in sexual relations.
4. Hide your face and weep should you dare to harm a child.
5. Do not condemn people for their inborn nature — why would God create so many homosexuals only in order to torture and destroy them?
6. Be aware that you, too, are an animal, and dependent on the web of nature. Try and think and act accordingly.
7. Do not imagine that you can escape judgement if you rob people with a false prospectus rather than with a knife.
8. Turn off that cell phone — you can have no idea how unimportant your call is to us.
9. Denounce all jihadists and crusaders for what they are: psychopathic criminals with ugly delusions. And terrible sexual repressions.
10. Be willing to renounce any god or any faith if any holy commandments should contradict any of the above.

- In short: Don't swallow your moral code in tablet form.

=== Bayer and Figdor's Ten Non-Commandments (2014) ===
As detailed in the book Atheist Mind, Humanist Heart: Re-writing the Ten Commandments for the Twenty-first Century by Lex Bayer and the Stanford Humanist Chaplain John Figdor, it is devoted to the subject of creating a secular alternative to the Ten Commandments and encouraging readers to formulate and discover their own list of beliefs.

1. The world is real, and our desire to understand the world is the basis for belief.
2. We can perceive the world only through our human senses.
3. We use rational thought and language as tools for understanding the world.
4. All truth is proportional to the evidence.
5. There is no God.
6. We all strive to live a happy life. We pursue things that make us happy and avoid things that do not.
7. There is no universal moral truth. Our experiences and preferences shape our sense of how to behave.
8. We act morally when the happiness of others makes us happy.
9. We benefit from living in, and supporting, an ethical society.
10. All our beliefs are subject to change in the face of new evidence, including these.

=== The Atheists' New Ten Commandments (2015) ===
These are the ten winning beliefs of the Rethink Prize, a crowdsourcing competition to rethink the Ten Commandments. The contest drew more than 2,800 submissions from 18 countries and 27 U.S. states. Winners were selected by a panel of judges.

1. Be open-minded and be willing to alter your beliefs with new evidence.
2. Strive to understand what is most likely to be true, not to believe what you wish to be true.
3. The scientific method is the most reliable way of understanding the natural world.
4. Every person has the right to control of their body.
5. God is not necessary to be a good person or to live a full and meaningful life.
6. Be mindful of the consequences of all your actions and recognize that you must take responsibility for them.
7. Treat others as you would want them to treat you, and can reasonably expect them to want to be treated. Think about their perspective.
8. We have the responsibility to consider others, including future generations.
9. There is no one right way to live.
10. Leave the world a better place than you found it.

=== Temple of Consciousness' #8ROZUM (2021) ===
Originally proposed on now defunct atheist.social social media platform, it was adopted by atheistic religion movement Temple of Consciousness. Name #8ROZUM is a Polish acronym and a world play. Rozum is the part of mind that is doing the reasoning and analysis, stressing out the fact that such guidelines can indeed be formed out of process of reasoning. Its full name Osiem Realistycznie Osiągalnych Zasad Uniwersalnej Moralności roughly translates to Eight Realistically Attainable Principles of Universal Morality.

1. Only Consciousness can be harmed, only Consciousness can be helped.
2. Don't try to interpret as harm what's not harm.
3. Respect your own and other peoples property, including peoples bodies.
4. Don't mislead yourself and don't mislead others.
5. Limit yourself from disturbing yourself and others.
6. Make profitable decisions and make them wisely.
7. Expect imperfections in yourself and the others.
8. Defend yourself when someone breaks the above rules to your detriment or to the detriment of people associated with you.

=== Frederick Nietzsche (1876) ===
Friedrich Nietzsche was a German philosopher, essayist, poet and writer. He drafted a private list of ten rules he called the "Ten Commandments of the Free Spirit" (Die 10 Gebote des Freigeistes) in his personal notebooks.

The 10 Commandments of the Free Spirit.

1. You shall neither love nor hate any people.

2. You shall not engage in politics.

3. You shall be neither rich nor a beggar.

4. You should avoid the famous and influential.

5. You shall take your wife from a people other than your own.

6. You should let your friends raise your children.

7. You shall not submit to any ceremony of the church.

8. You should not regret a transgression, but rather do an additional good deed because of it.

9. In order to tell the truth, you should choose exile.

10. You should let the world be against you and you against the world.

== See also ==
- The Eleventh Commandment (Ronald Reagan)
- Moral Code of the Builder of Communism
- Three Laws of Robotics
- Eight Honors and Eight Shames
- Georgia Guidestones
