= Beyond Religion: Ethics for a Whole World =

2011 book by 14th Dalai Lama

- Author: 14th Dalai Lama
- Language: English
- Publisher: Houghton Mifflin Harcourt
- Publication date: December 6, 2011
- Pages: 208 (Hardcover)

Beyond Religion: Ethics for a Whole World is a 2011 book by the 14th Dalai Lama. It is about the use of secular ethics in everyday life: ethics that can be applied by both religious and non-religious people. The book contains many suggestions for overcoming destructive emotions and helping other people, and it argues for the importance of compassion.
