= Charles A. Hill (activist) =

American activist and minister (1893-1970)

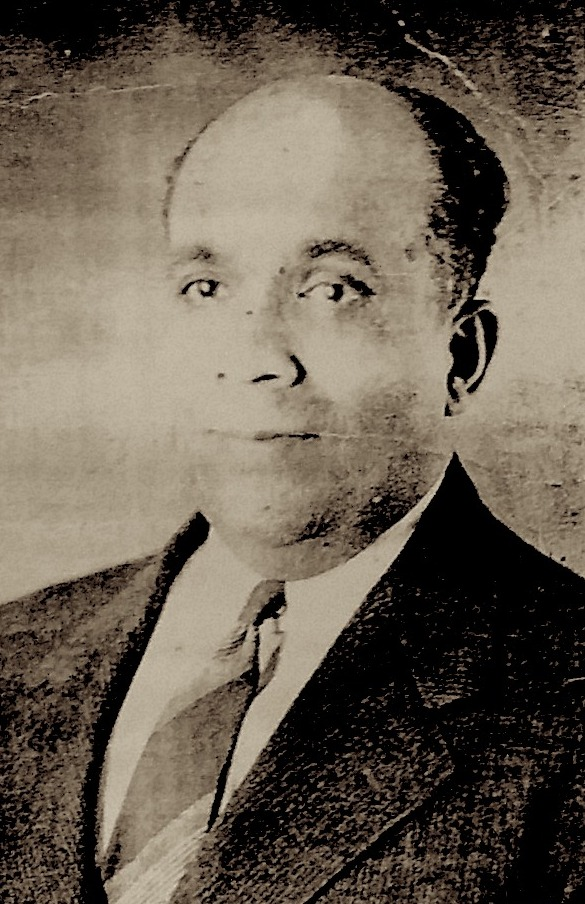
- Born: April 28, 1893; Detroit, Michigan, U.S.
- Died: February 8, 1970 (aged 76); Detroit, Michigan, U.S.
- Education: Cleary Business College; Lincoln University; Moody Bible Institute
- Occupations: Civil rights activist; trade unionist; pastor
- Political party: Democratic Party
- Spouse: Georgia Roberta Underwood (m. 1919)
- Children: 8

Religious life
- Religion: Baptism
- Ordination: 1918

Senior posting
- Post: Pastor of Hartford Memorial Baptist Church
- Period in office: 1920–1968
- Successor: Charles Gilchrist Adams

Charles Andrew Hill (April 28, 1893 – February 8, 1970) was an American activist and minister. After working in organizing union activity for the Detroit area's automobile workers, he joined the civil rights movement as part of the Double V campaign, advocating for integrated public housing and a federal grand jury probe on the 1943 Detroit race riot, while being targeted by the Red Scare. He briefly served as president of the Detroit NAACP chapter, and ran for political office several times, including at the 1955 Michigan's 15th congressional district special election. He served as pastor of Hartford Memorial Baptist Church from 1920 until 1968.

== Early life and education ==
Charles Andrew Hill was born on April 28, 1893, in Detroit, Michigan. His father Edward Hill was African-American and his mother Mary Lantz was German-American; they separated during his youth, and the latter raised him as a single parent. Raised in an orphanage due to rampant sexism making it hard for his mother to find economic opportunities, he attended the local public school system. Dominic J. Capeci noted that "only sketchy information exists about Hill's family and upbringing".

After graduating from Cleary Business College, (Note: Sources differ on the year of graduation. While the finding aid of his archives at the Bentley Historical Library says that it was 1912, Capeci says it was 1914.) Hill did his religious education at Lincoln University and Moody Bible Institute, and he was ordained as a minister in 1918. He originally served at Second Baptist Church as an assistant pastor for Robert L. Bradby, Sr. before leaving due to its complicity in automobile companies’ union busting tactics. In 1920, he became the pastor of the newly-founded Hartford Memorial Baptist Church. Originally starting with 35 members, the church became one of the city's largest Black churches at over a thousand members in 1945. He once served as president of the Baptist Ministers Alliance, as well as race relations committee chair at the Detroit Council of Churches and executive board member of the Michigan Council of Churches.

== Activism ==
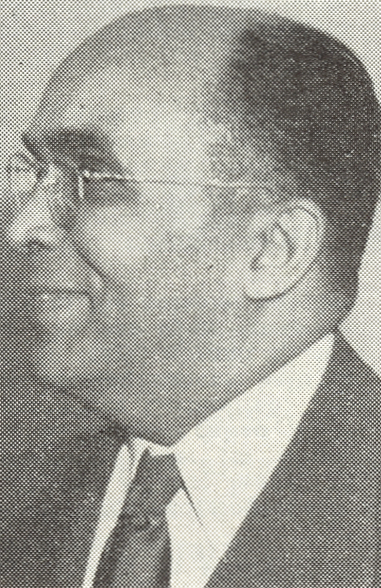
Hill c. 1952

In the late-1930s, Hill started his activism career, beginning with trade union advocacy. He supported the United Auto Workers’s campaign to unionize of the Ford River Rouge complex, breaking with the local Black clergy by hosting union meetings at his church, and recruited more Black organizers for the Civil Rights Federation and United Auto Workers. He also successfully advocated for more Black representation in the Detroit Edison Company workforce, and led the Michigan National Negro Congress and was part of the Detroit Inter-Racial Committee. The UAW Local 600 granted him honorary membership for his work in unionization.

Hill's trade union advocacy inspired him to join the civil rights movement, and he participated in the Double V campaign during World War II. Hill organized support for integrated public housing, including at the Sojourner Truth Project, which led to the formation of the Sojourner Truth Citizens Committee of 1942. However, the committee (by then the Citizens Committee for Jobs in War Industries) lost funding and office space after he unsuccessfully ran to replace James J. McClendon as president of the Detroit NAACP chapter, and later moderated in strategy after the 1943 Detroit race riot, though he later moved further to the left in the coming years. Following racial clashes over the causes behind the riots, he was unsuccessful in obtaining a federal grand jury probe on the riots. In 1946, he did replace McClendon, but later that year lost his bid for re-election to Robert L. Bradby, Jr. after he "gained the reputation of being not just a poor administrator but [also] an advocate of communist organizations and causes".

Hill ran as a Democratic candidate at the 1955 Michigan's 15th congressional district special election. He finished second place in the Democratic primary with 7,624 votes, losing to eventual general election winner John Dingell. He was also an unsuccessful candidate for the Detroit Common Council in 1945, 1947, 1949, as well as in the primary of a 1948 special election. He once supported a coalition that unsuccessfully challenged Edward Jeffries at the 1945 Detroit mayoral election.

Amidst the Red Scare, Hill attracted accusations of communism due to his activism. The House Un-American Activities Committee repeatedly subpoenaed Hill, at one point due to his advocacy against American involvement in the Korean War. The Detroit Police Department's Criminal Intelligence Bureau, known as the "Red Squad", had several files on Hall. Additionally, his son's career as a decorated pilot ended when the United States Air Force charged him with disloyalty, a charge Capeci called guilt by association. Hill denied being a communist and remained in the civil rights movement regardless. In 1968, he retired as pastor, and he was replaced by Charles Gilchrist Adams in 1969.

== Personal life and death ==
Hill married Georgia Roberta Underwood in 1919. They had eight children. Hill lived in 1660 West Grand Boulevard at the time of his death.

Hill died on February 8, 1970, in Hutzel Women's Hospital. His papers are held in the Bentley Historical Library at the University of Michigan.
