= Amy Hollywood =

Scholar of religion

- Education: Bryn Mawr College; University of Chicago
- Employer: Harvard Divinity School
- Title: Elizabeth H. Monrad Professor of Christian Studies

Amy Hollywood is an American scholar of religion. She is Elizabeth H. Monrad Professor of Christian Studies at the Harvard Divinity School.

== Education ==
Hollywood attended Bryn Mawr College, studying religion and graduating with high honors in 1985. She then earned a master's in religious studies (1986) and doctorate in theology (1991) from the University of Chicago.

== Career ==
In 1997 Hollywood won the Otto Grundler Prize for the best book in medieval studies from the International Congress of Medieval Studies for her book The Soul as Virgin Wife: Mechthild of Magdeburg, Marguerite Porete, and Meister Eckhart. The book was based on her doctoral thesis.

Hollywood taught at Syracuse University and Rhodes College, then Dartmouth College until 2003 when she returned to the University of Chicago. At Chicago she was Professor of Theology and the History of Christianity in the Divinity School. In 2005, she joined the faculty of Harvard Divinity School, where she is Elizabeth H. Monrad Professor of Christian Studies.

== Works ==
- The Soul as Virgin Wife: Mechthild of Magdeburg, Marguerite Porete, and Meister Eckhart (University of Notre Dame Press, 1995)
- Sensible Ecstasy: Mysticism, Sexual Difference, and the Demands of History (University of Chicago Press, 2002)
- Acute Melancholia and Other Essays (Columbia University Press, 2016)
