= Harvard Divinity School =

Divinity school at Harvard University in Cambridge, Massachusetts

- Coat of arms
- Type: Private nonprofit divinity school
- Established: 1816; 210 years ago
- Parent institution: Harvard University
- Affiliations: Boston Theological Interreligious Consortium
- Dean: Marla F. Frederick
- Faculty: 131
- Students: 377
- Doctoral students: 108
- Location: Cambridge, Massachusetts, United States; 42°22′47″N 71°06′47″W
- Website: hds.harvard.edu

Harvard Divinity School (HDS) is one of the constituent schools of Harvard University in Cambridge, Massachusetts. The school's mission is to educate its students either in the academic study of religion or for leadership roles in religion, government, and service. It also caters to students from other Harvard schools that are interested in the former field. HDS is among a small group of university-based, non-denominational divinity schools in the United States.

== History ==
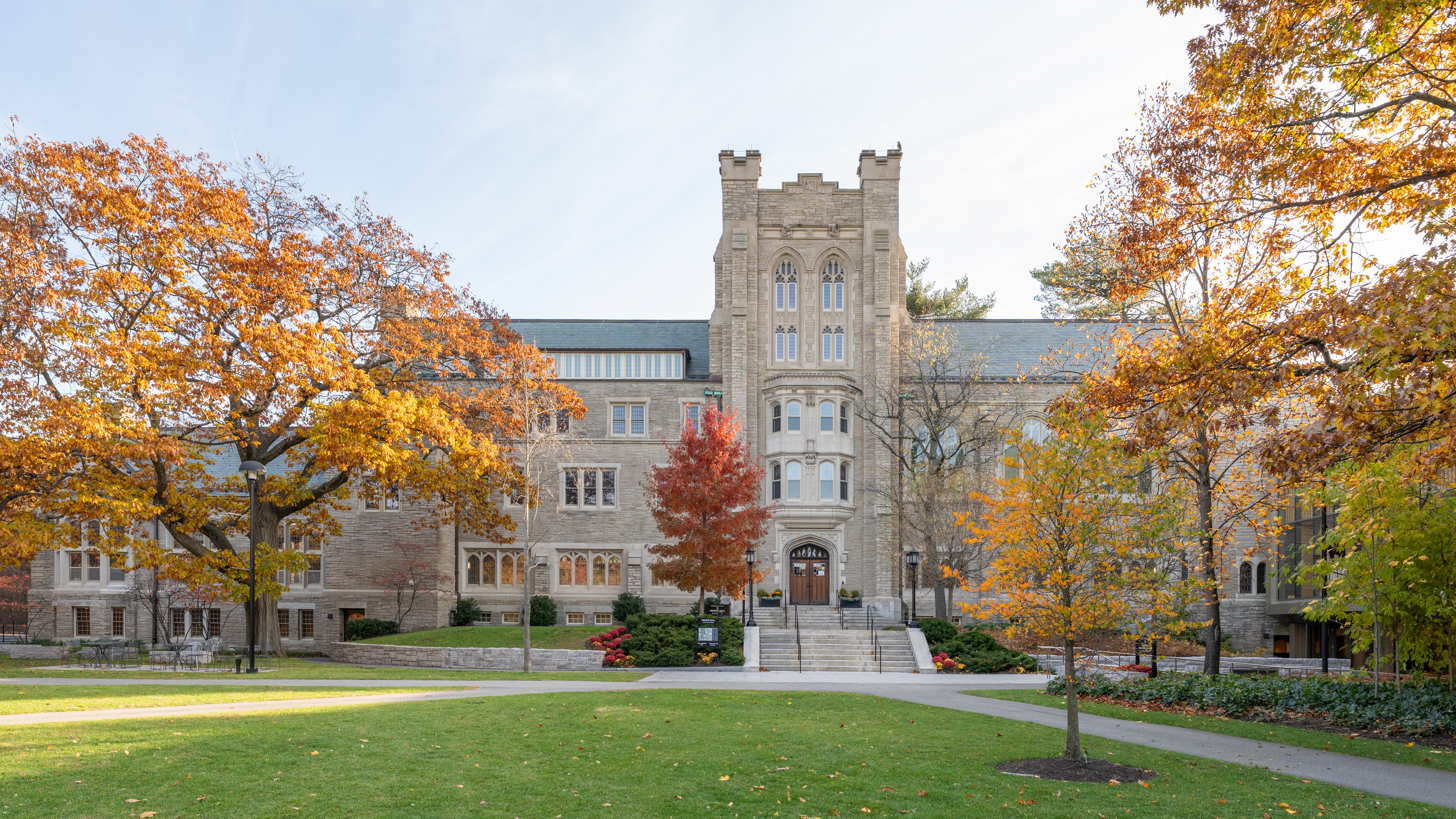
Swartz Hall (formerly Andover Hall) in 2025

Harvard College was founded in 1636 as a Puritan/Congregationalist institution and trained ministers for many years. The separate institution of the Divinity School dates from 1816, when it was established as the first non-denominational divinity school in the United States. (Princeton Theological Seminary was founded as a Presbyterian institution in 1812. Andover Theological Seminary was founded in 1807 by orthodox Calvinists who fled Harvard College after it appointed liberal theologian Henry Ware to the Hollis Professorship of Divinity in 1805.)

During its first century, Harvard Divinity School was unofficially associated with American Unitarianism.

=== Harvard Divinity School and Unitarianism ===
Throughout the 18th century, Enlightenment ideas of the power of reason and free will became widespread among Congregationalist ministers, putting those ministers and their congregations in tension with more traditionalist, Calvinist parties.

When the Hollis Professor of Divinity David Tappan died in 1803 and the president of Harvard Joseph Willard died a year later, in 1804, the overseer of the college Jedidiah Morse demanded that orthodox men be elected.

Nevertheless, after much struggle, the Unitarian Henry Ware was elected in 1805, which signaled the changing of the tide from the dominance of traditional, Calvinist ideas at Harvard to the dominance of liberal, Arminian ideas (defined by traditionalists as Unitarian ideas). The appointment of Ware, with the election of the liberal Samuel Webber to the presidency of Harvard two years later, led Jedidiah Morse and other conservatives to found the Andover Theological Seminary as an orthodox alternative to the Harvard Divinity School.

== Buildings ==
=== Divinity Hall ===
Divinity Hall, dedicated in 1826, was the first Harvard building built outside Harvard Yard. It contains classrooms, faculty and staff offices, and Divinity Chapel, also called Emerson Chapel, where Ralph Waldo Emerson gave the Divinity School Address in 1838.

=== Swartz Hall (formerly Andover Hall) ===
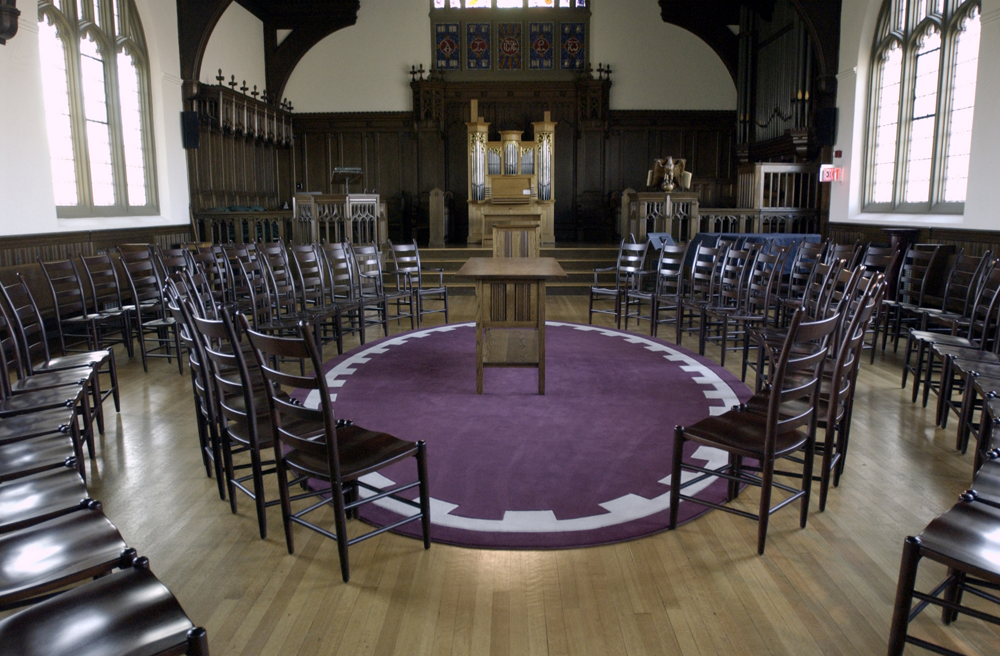
Andover Chapel, Andover Hall, 2nd floor

Completed in 1911 at a cost of $300,000, Andover Hall was designed by Allen and Collens, a firm that focused largely on neo-medieval and ecclesiastical designs, and is the only building at Harvard built in the Collegiate Gothic style of architecture.

Andover Hall was commissioned by Andover Theological Seminary, which, by 1906, saw its enrollment slide and entered an affiliation with the Divinity School in 1908. The Hall contained a chapel, library, dorms, and seminar and lecture rooms. Today, the building still contains a chapel and some classrooms, but it also holds many administrative and faculty offices.

On 1 May 2019, the building's name was changed to Swartz Hall in honor of philanthropists Susan Shallcross Swartz and James R. Swartz.

=== Jewett House ===
Jewett House, constructed in 1913, is named for its first occupant, James Richard Jewett, a Harvard University professor of Arabic from 1914 to 1933. Jewett's son had donated the house to Harvard for the use of the Divinity School, but it was instead used by Harvard University Press. In 1956, the house was renovated to serve as the home of the Harvard Divinity School's dean.

=== Carriage House ===
The Carriage House of Jewett House is now the home for the Women's Studies in Religion Program. In the past, it served as a home or office for a series of Divinity School faculty and staff, including the family of Brita and former dean Krister Stendahl, who lived in the Carriage House in the 1960s.

=== Library ===
Previously housed in Andover Hall, the library moved into its own two-story granite building, designed by Shepley, Bulfinch, Richardson and Abbott in 1960. In September 2001, the library completed an $11.5-million renovation that added two stories, enhanced its technology facilities and study areas, and improved its information systems.

=== Center for the Study of World Religions building ===
Constructed in 1960, the Center for the Study of World Religions building was designed by the Catalonian architect Josep Lluis Sert, then dean of Harvard's Graduate School of Design, for what was his first Harvard commission.

=== Rockefeller Hall ===
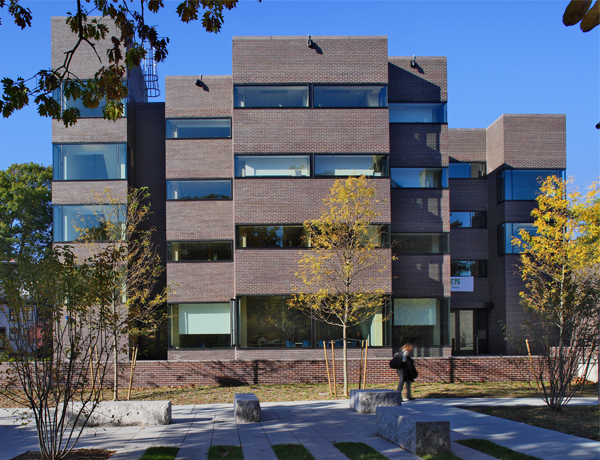
Rockefeller Hall designed by Edward Larrabee Barnes and Associates

Rockefeller Hall, designed by Edward Larrabee Barnes in 1970, featured seminar rooms and a refectory on the ground floor and student housing above. A 2008 renovation by VSBA/Venturi, Scott Brown and Associates, Inc. transformed the upper floors into staff offices, modernized access and created the fourth LEED Gold building at Harvard.

== Academics ==
=== Degrees ===
Harvard Divinity School is accredited by the Association of Theological Schools in the United States and Canada (ATS) and approved by ATS to grant the following degrees:

- Master of Theological Studies (MTS)
- Master of Divinity (MDiv)
- Master of Religion and Public Life (MRPL)
- Master of Theology (ThM)

In April 2014, the faculty of HDS voted to suspend admission to its Doctor of Theology (Th.D.) program, although students already enrolled in the ThD program were allowed to complete their degrees. Instead, doctoral students pursue Doctor of Philosophy (PhD) degrees under the auspices of the Committee on the Study of Religion, which is made up of 50% Arts and Sciences and 50% Divinity faculty members and housed in the Harvard Faculty of Arts and Sciences. While many PhD students in the GSAS take courses at HDS, and both HDS and FAS characterize the PhD as a joint program, PhD students are formally enrolled in the GSAS and not HDS; only the GSAS at Harvard may award the PhD.

=== Curriculum ===
Candidates for the MTS choose among 18 areas of academic focus:

- African and African American Religious Studies
- Buddhist Studies
- Comparative Studies
- East Asian Religions
- Hebrew Bible / Old Testament
- Hindu Studies
- History of Christianity
- Islamic Studies
- Jewish Studies
- New Testament and Early Christianity
- Philosophy of Religion
- Religions of the Americas
- Religion, Ethics, and Politics
- Religion, Literature, and Culture
- Religion and the Social Sciences
- South Asian Religious Studies
- Theology
- Women, Gender, Sexuality, and Religion

Candidates for the MDiv are required to take at least twelve courses in scriptural interpretation and histories, theologies, and practices. Those 12 courses must include:

- Three courses in the theories, methods, and practices of scriptural interpretation
- Six courses in the histories, theologies, and practices of religious traditions
- No more than nine courses in the same religious tradition, or listed in no religious tradition(s)
- At least six courses addressing one or more religious tradition(s); of those six, only three may be in the same tradition

=== Harvard Divinity School Library (previously Andover-Harvard Theological Library) ===
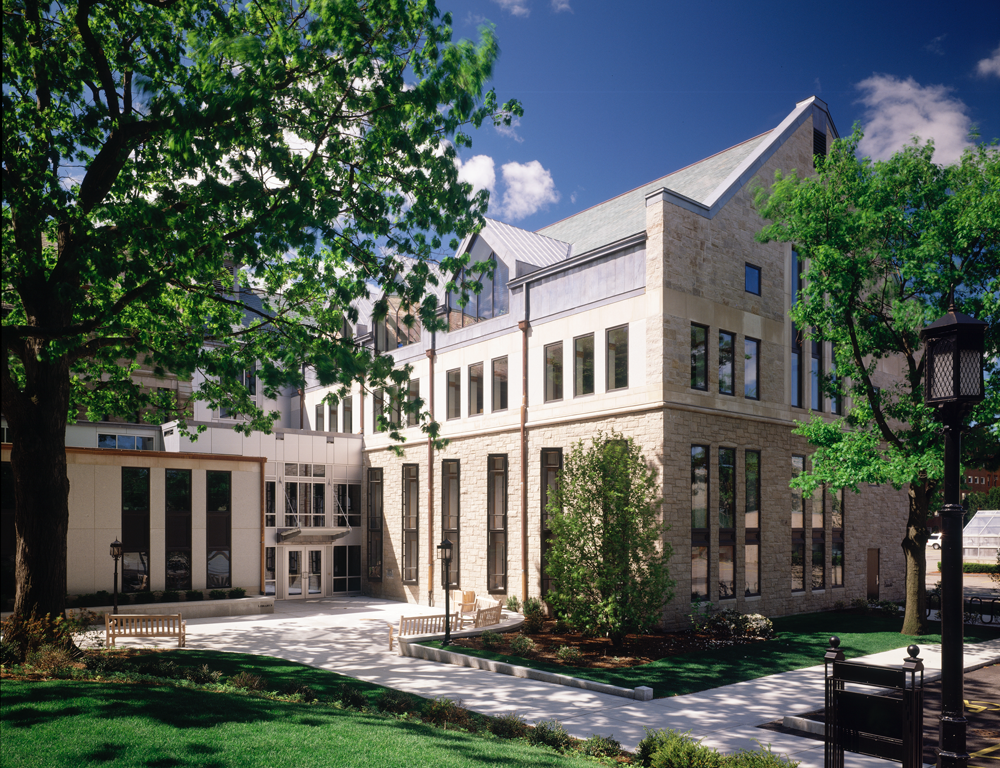
Harvard Divinity School Library

Library support for the study of religion at Harvard predates the establishment of the Divinity School; almost three-fourths of the 400 volumes that John Harvard gave to Harvard College in 1638 were theological in nature. Books on religion made up a third to a half of the college's holdings until the Divinity School was established in 1816 and duplicates from the College Library were combined with new purchases to form the beginnings of a specialized library for the school. In 1911, Harvard Divinity School and Andover Theological Seminary formed a partnership and agreed to house their collections together in a common library; when the educational partnership of the schools was dissolved in 1926, Andover Seminary's deposits remained in the library under the terms of a continuing agreement. The library's name changed from "Andover-Harvard Theological Library" to "Harvard Divinity School Library" in 2021.

The library's collections include all religious traditions in order to support the many approaches to the study of religion at Harvard Divinity School. Its historical collection strengths include Protestant Christianity, Unitarian Universalism, and biblical studies. Additional areas of collecting emphasis since the second half of the twentieth century include women's studies in religion, the relation of religion to ethnicity and to LGBTQ studies, the ecumenical movement, interreligious communication, and religion and peace-making. Similarly, the rare book collection has strengths in early Protestant Christianity, Unitarian Universalism and related “nonconforming” traditions, and biblical studies. Notable special collections include the papers of Unitarian preacher and theologian William Ellery Channing, theologians Paul Tillich and H. Richard Niebuhr, and New Testament scholar Caspar René Gregory.

Harvard Divinity School Library is part of Harvard Library, whose resources are available to all faculty, staff, and students at HDS. Harvard Library's collection has over six million digitized items, 20 million print volumes, 400 million manuscripts, one million maps, tens of millions of digital images, and rare and special collections. Harvard Library collects collaboratively with peer institutions and facilitates international open access, multiplying researchers’ access to materials.

The HDS Library also participates in the Boston Theological Interreligious Consortium (BTI) library program, which extends borrowing privileges to HDS students and faculty at libraries of other BTI schools.

== Research and special programs ==
=== Current ===
==== Center for the Study of World Religions ====
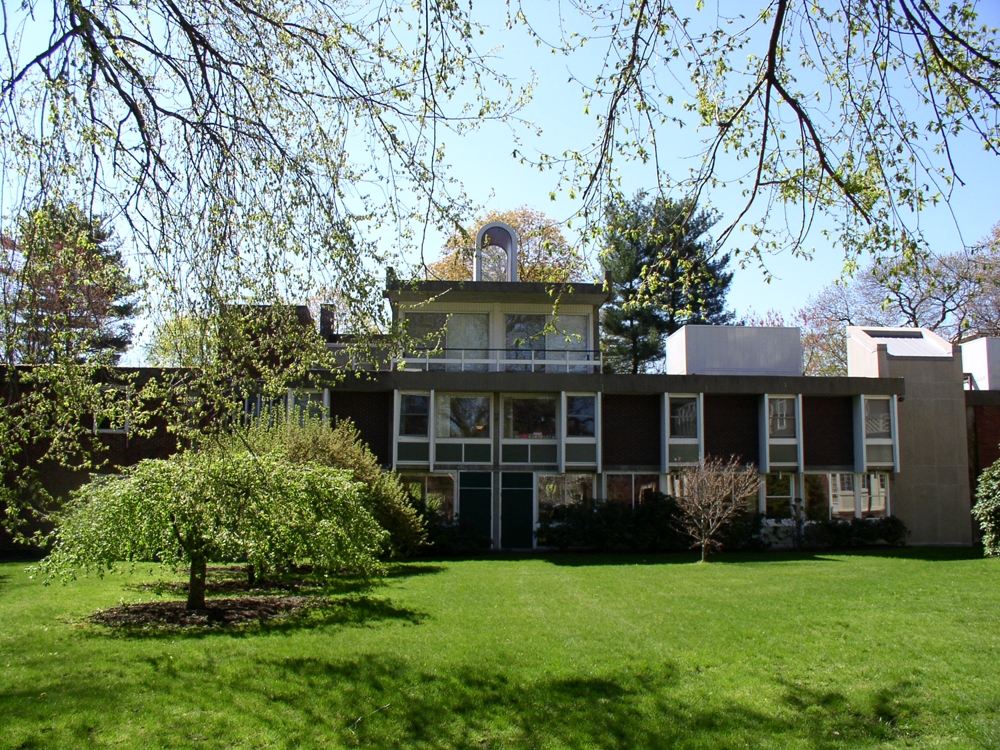
Rear view of the CSWR designed by Josep Lluís Sert

Founded in 1960 after an anonymous donation in 1957, the Center for the Study of World Religions at Harvard Divinity School is a residential community of academic fellows, graduate students, and visiting professors of many world religious traditions. The center focuses on the understanding of religions globally through its research, publications, funding, and public programs. It welcomes scholars and practitioners and highlights the intellectual and historical dimensions of religious dialogue.

The center sponsors a diverse range of educative programs, ranging from public lectures to colloquia and reading groups, student-initiated projects, and "religion in the news" lunches on topics of public interest. The center's meditation room is open to all members of the Harvard community.

Directors of the CSWR have included Robert H. L. Slater (1958–64), Wilfred Cantwell Smith (1954–73), John B. Carman (1973–89), Lawrence E. Sullivan (1990–2003), Donald K. Swearer (2004–10), and Francis X. Clooney (2010–17). As of July 1, 2017, its director is Charles Stang, a scholar of ancient Christianity, focusing especially on Eastern varieties of late antique Christianity.

==== Women's Studies in Religion Program ====
The Women's Studies in Religion Program (WSRP) at Harvard Divinity School was founded in 1973 as a response to student requests to include women's perspectives in the sources, methods, and subject matter of the HDS curriculum. The program brings five postdoctoral scholars to HDS as visiting faculty each year. Each research associate works on a book-length research project related to religion and gender and teaches a course related to their research. Since its founding, the program has supported more than 200 scholars from institutions of higher learning in the United States and around the world.

Directors of the Women's Studies in Religion Program include Brinton Lykes (1973–77), Constance Buchanan (1977–97), and Ann D. Braude (1998–present).

=== Past ===
==== Program in Religion and Secondary Education ====
The Program in Religion and Secondary Education (PRSE) was a teacher education program that prepared students to teach about religion in public schools from a non-sectarian perspective. It began in 1972 as a two-year pilot project known as the "Secondary School Teaching Certificate Option," and by 1983, it had evolved into a collaboration between Harvard Divinity School and the Harvard Graduate School of Education. Students in the master of theological studies or master of divinity degree programs integrated their work in religion with courses on education and public policy to understand the relationship between religion and education and to advance religious literacy within their fields of licensure. The program stopped admitting new students in the 2009–10 academic year, although students who were already in the PRSE were able to finish their degrees in normal fashion.

==== Summer Leadership Institute ====
The Summer Leadership Institute (SLI) was a two-week training program that sought to establish theological instruction and grounding for individuals engaged in community and economic development. It was offered by Harvard Divinity School from 1998 to 2008.

The program of study was divided into four modules: Theology, Ethics, and Public Policy; Organizational Development and Management; Housing and Community Development; and Finance and Economic Development. Participants also developed individual plans of action, on a case-study model, applicable to the local work in their communities. It was a full-time residential program, holding classes five days a week, with an emphasis on faith-based case studies of corporations and communities.

More than 450 participants completed the program. About 50 people were selected each year from around the United States and internationally to participate in lectures, seminars, and field visits with faculty from across Harvard and other recognized experts.

Directors of the program were Preston N. Williams (1998–2008) and Charles Gilchrist Adams (2008–09).

== Notable professors ==
- James Luther Adams, ethicist and most influential theologian among American Unitarian Universalists in the 20th century
- Leila Ahmed, professor of women's studies and scholar of Islam
- Charles Gilchrist Adams, William and Lucille Nickerson Professor of the Practice of Ethics and Ministry (2006–2011)
- François Bovon, professor emeritus, prolific scholar in New Testament and Christian Apocrypha
- Sravana Borkataky Varma, lecturer on Hindu traditions, historian, educator, and social entrepreneur
- Frederick Buechner, American theologian and author. Buechner's Harvard sermons, delivered at the Noble Lecture series in 1969, were published in 1970 under the title The Alphabet of Grace. He also spent time lecturing on homiletics at the school.
- Davíd Carrasco, scholar of Latin American religion and culture
- Francis Xavier Clooney, comparative theologian and scholar of Hinduism
- Harvey Cox, Hollis Professor of Divinity emeritus, author of "The Secular City"
- Diana L. Eck, scholar of Hinduism and founder of The Pluralism Project
- Ephraim Emerton (1851–1935), first recipient of the Winn Professorship of Ecclesiastical History
- Charles Carroll Everett, professor and dean of the Divinity School (1878–1900), also an alumnus of the school
- Marla F. Frederick, dean of the school from 2024 to the present, scholar of African American religion
- Peter J. Gomes (1942–2011), Pusey Minister in the Memorial Church of Harvard University and Plummer Professor of Christian Morals
- Janet Gyatso, scholar of Tibetan Buddhism, history, and culture
- Degalle Mahinda Thero, Emeritus Professor of Bath Spa University
- William A. Graham, dean of the school from 2002 to 2012, Albertson Prof. of Middle Eastern Studies (Arts and Sciences), comparative historian and scholar of Islam
- Charles Hallisey, scholar of Therevada Buddhism
- David N. Hempton, dean of the school from 2012 to 2023, historian of Methodism and Evangelical Protestantism
- Amy Hollywood
- Michael Jackson, anthropologist and novelist
- Baber Johansen, scholar of Islamic law
- Ousmane Oumar Kane, Alwaleed Professor of Contemporary Islamic Religion and Society
- Karen King, Hollis Professor of Divinity, author of "What is Gnosticism?" and "The Gospel of Mary Magdala"
- Gordon D. Kaufman (died 2011), liberal Mennonite pacifist theologian and author of God the Problem
- Helmut Koester (died 2016), professor emeritus, New Testament scholar
- Jon D. Levenson, scholar of Hebrew Bible and Jewish studies
- Arthur Chute McGill, (1926–1980) Bussey Professor of Theology at Harvard from 1971 until 1980
- Richard R. Niebuhr, Hollis Professor of Divinity emeritus, theologian
- Henri Nouwen (1983–1985), Professor of Divinity and Horace De Y. Lentz Lecturer
- Jacob K. Olupona, scholar of Indigenous Religions, Religions in Africa
- Tenzin Priyadarshi, president of Dalai Lama Center for Ethics and Transformative Values, MIT
- Elisabeth Schüssler Fiorenza, Krister Stendahl Professor feminist New Testament scholar, author of In Memory of Her, Rhetoric and Ethic, The Power of the Word, and many other titles
- Francis Schüssler Fiorenza, Charles Chauncey Stillman Professor of Roman Catholic Theological Studies
- Wilfred Cantwell Smith, former director of the school's Center for the Study of World Religions
- Ronald Frank Thiemann, Christian theologian and dean of the Divinity School from 1986 to 1998
- Paul Tillich (1886–1965), Protestant theologian and Christian existentialist
- Henry Ware Jr., (1794–1843), Unitarian theologian
- Henry Ware Sr. (1764–1845), prominent early Unitarian theologian
- C. Conrad Wright (1917–2011), historian of American Congregationalism and Unitarianism
- George Ernest Wright (1958–1974), Parkman Professor of Divinity; (1961–1974) Curator of the Semitic Museum, Presbyterian, leading Old Testament scholar and biblical archaeologist
- Cornel West, public intellectual, author, philosopher, political activist, social critic and member of the Democratic Socialists of America

== Notable alumni ==
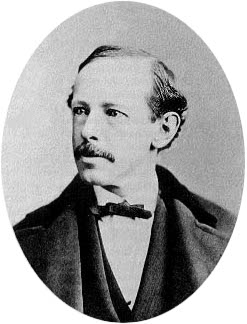
Horatio Alger

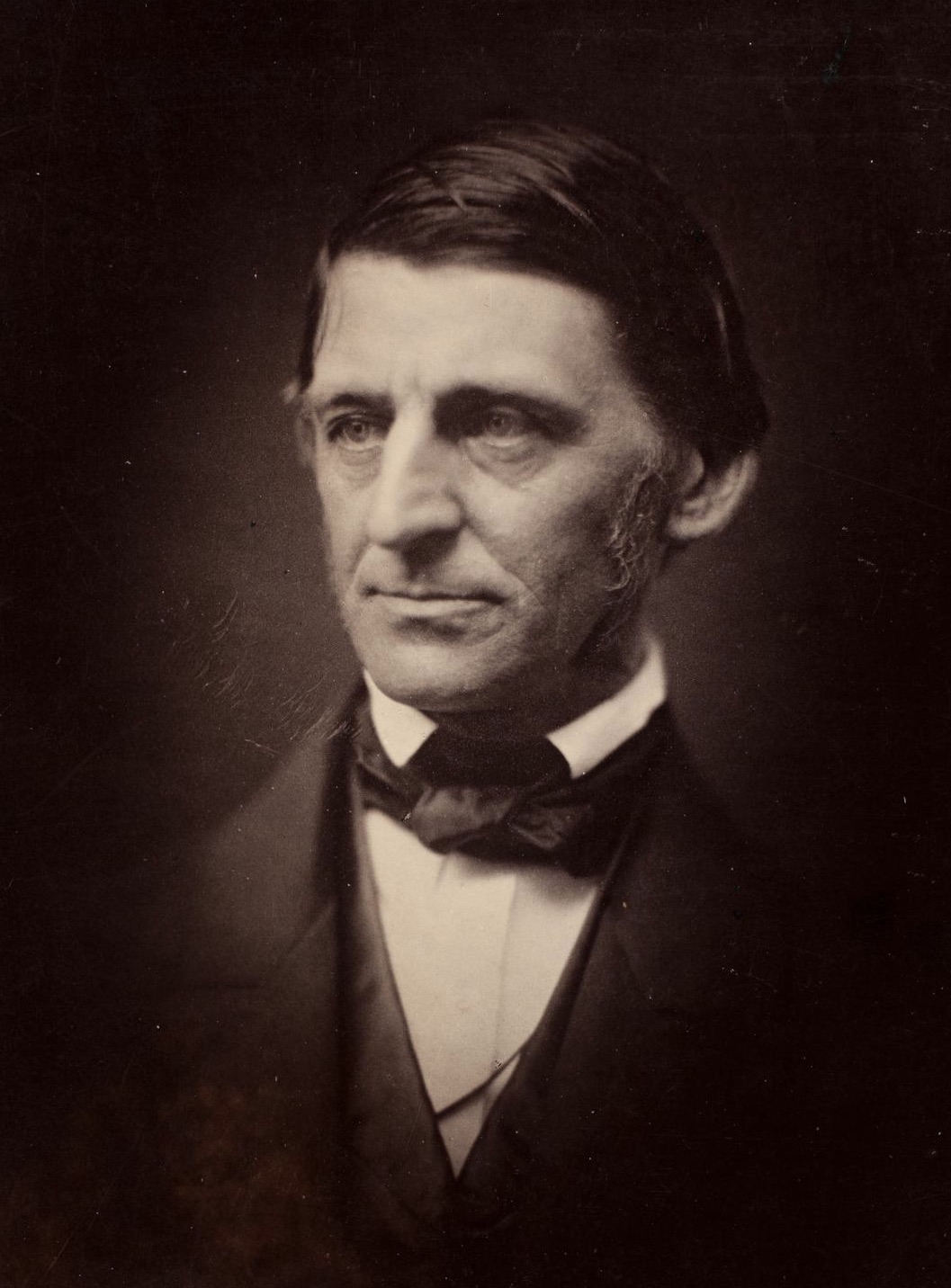
Ralph Waldo Emerson

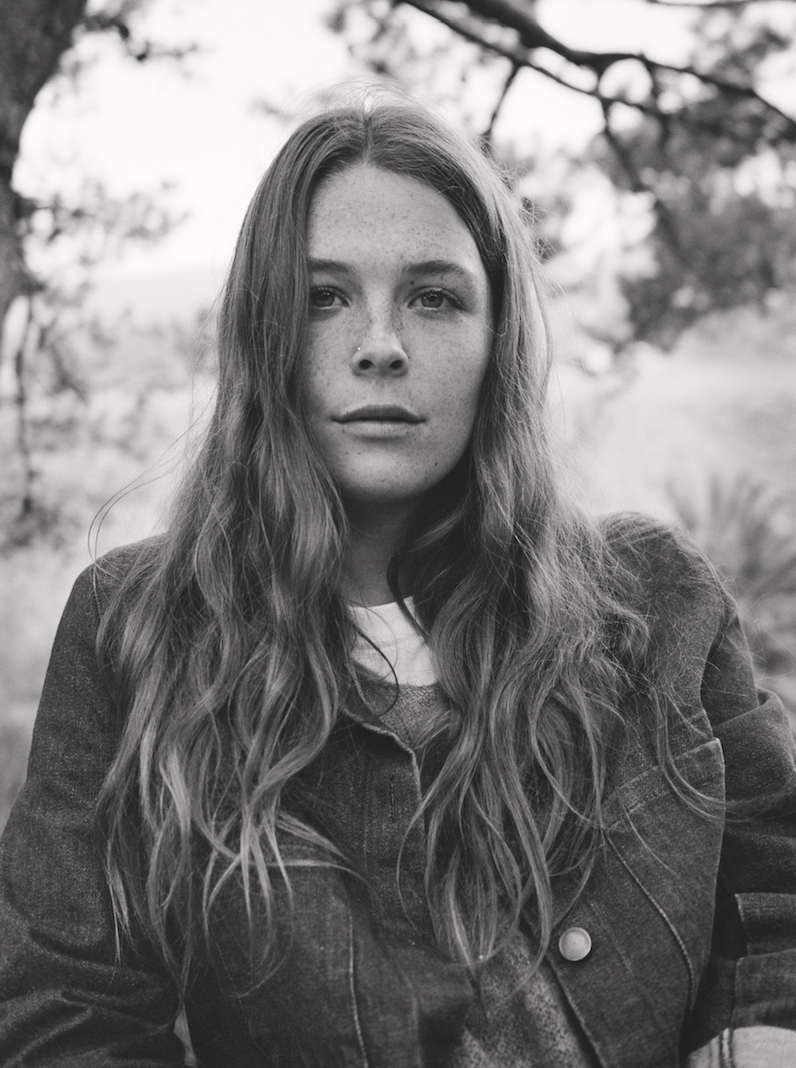
Maggie Rogers

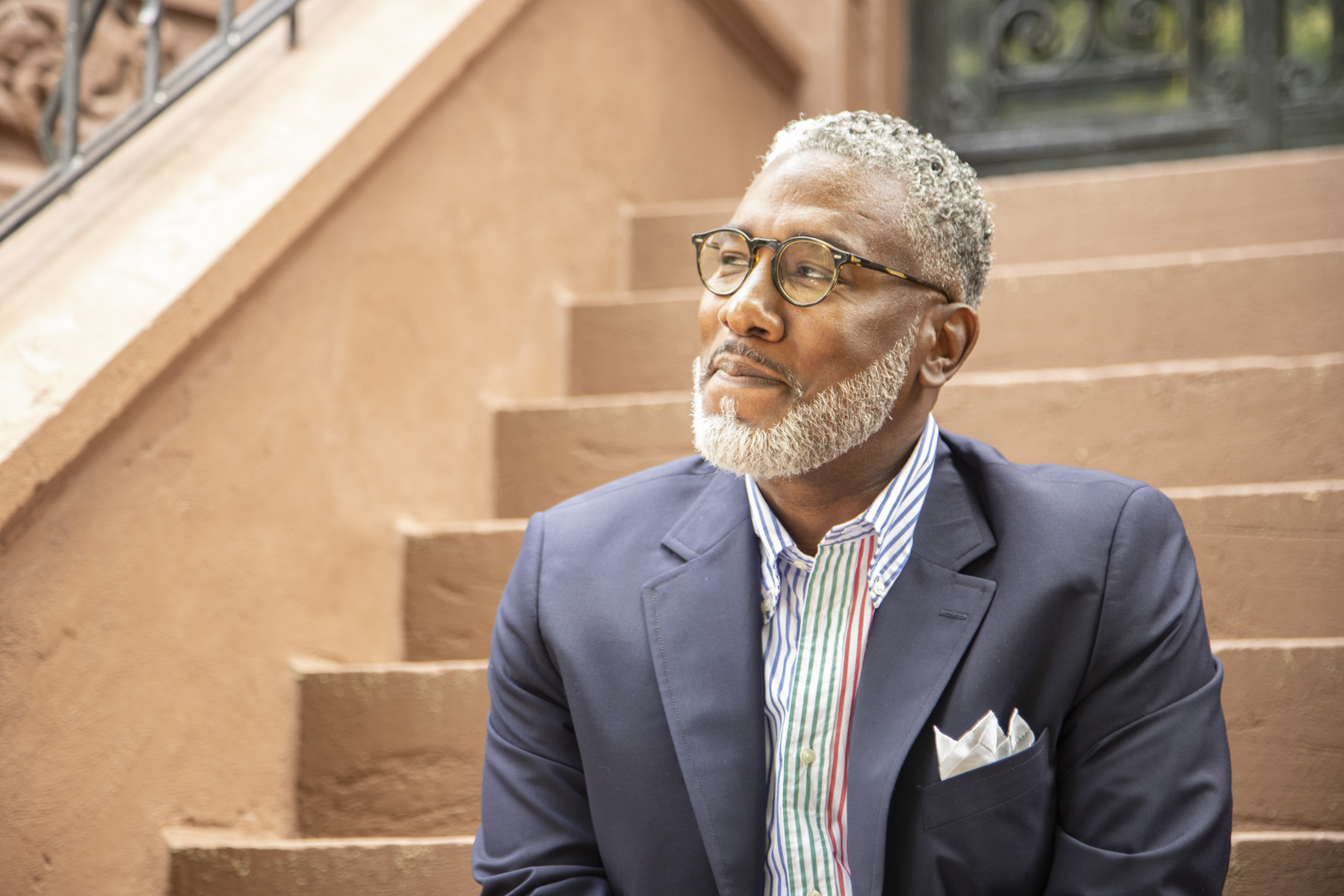
Conrad Tillard

- Susan Ackerman, (born 1958), Hebrew Bible scholar
- Charles G. Adams, Baptist pastor; William and Lucille Nickerson Professor of the Practice of Ethics and Ministry, Harvard Divinity School.
- Emma Anderson, professor of Classics and Religious Studies at University of Ottawa
- Chris Adrian, author and medical doctor
- Horatio Alger, scholar and novelist
- Paula Arai, Buddhist studies scholar, researcher, and professor
- Reza Aslan, author and Islamic scholar
- Charles Bennison, bishop in the Episcopal Church
- Rebecca Birk, English Liberal Jewish rabbi
- George Madison Bodge, author, historian, and Unitarian minister
- George Bradburn, Unitarian preacher and abolitionist from Massachusetts.
- Neville Callam, General Secretary of the Baptist World Alliance
- Edward John Carnell, prominent neoevangelical theologian
- Tom Chappell, founder of Tom's of Maine, large producer of natural personal care products
- Tom Chick, actor, editor and video game journalist
- Delman Coates, Senior Pastor, Mt. Ennon Baptist Church, Clinton, MD
- Moncure D. Conway, Unitarian preacher and abolitionist from Virginia.
- Mary Leggett Cooke (1852-1938), Unitarian minister and member of the Iowa Sisterhood
- Janet Cooper-Nelson, Chaplain of Brown University, first woman university chaplain in the Ivy League
- John Cranley, former congressional candidate in Ohio.
- Demetrios, Archbishop of America, former primate of the Greek Orthodox Archdiocese of America
- Gary Dorrien, American social ethicist and theologian, Reinhold Niebuhr Professor of Social Ethics at Union Theological Seminary in the City of New York and Professor of Religion at Columbia University.
- Elizabeth Eaton, presiding bishop of the Evangelical Lutheran Church in America
- William Greenleaf Eliot, co-founder of Washington University in St. Louis
- Ralph Waldo Emerson, philosopher, poet, and essayist
- Archie Epps, Harvard University Dean of Students 1971–1999
- Greg Epstein (born 1977), president of the Harvard Chaplains Organization and Humanist Chaplain at Harvard University and the Massachusetts Institute of Technology; ordained Humanist rabbi
- John Figdor, Humanist Chaplain at Stanford University
- Richard Elliott Friedman (born 1946), biblical scholar and Professor of Jewish Studies at the University of Georgia
- Robert P. George, author, constitutional law scholar, and Princeton professor
- Ronald Goetz, Niebuhr Distinguished Chair in Christian Theology and Ethics at Elmhurst College
- Peter J. Gomes, preacher and writer and Chaplain, Harvard University
- Samuel Swett Green, key figure in the public library movement and the "founding father" of reference librarianship.
- Aaron Gross, historian of religions who focuses on modern Jewish ethics, the study of animals and religion, and food and religion.
- Stephen A. Hayner, President of Columbia Theological Seminary, ordained minister of the Presbyterian Church USA, professor, former president of InterVarsity Christian Fellowship
- Chris Hedges, author and journalist
- Iakovos, Archbishop of America, Greek Orthodox Archbishop of America from 1959 to 1996
- James Franklin Kay, professor of Homiletics and Liturgy at Princeton Theological Seminary
- Ray Keck, president of Texas A&M International University in Laredo, Texas; was Rockefeller Brothers Fellow at Harvard Divinity
- Muhammad Kenyatta, professor, civil rights leader and politician
- Shabbos Kestenbaum (born 1999), activist
- Michael Muhammad Knight, author
- Scotty McLennan, Dean for Religious Life at Stanford University
- C.E. Morgan, author
- Tori Murden, the first woman to row solo across the Atlantic Ocean, and to ski to the geographic South Pole
- William B. Oden, bishop in the United Methodist Church
- Theodore Parker, prominent Unitarian and transcendentalist Unitarian minister, scholar, abolitionist and author of the line, "...the moral...arc of history...bends toward justice..."
- Rodney L. Petersen, scholar of history, ethics, and religious conflict, and executive director of the Boston Theological Institute
- Richard L. Pratt Jr., Professor of Old Testament, President of Third Millennium Ministries
- George Putnam, Unitarian minister and Massachusetts state legislator
- Maggie Rogers, musician
- Letty M. Russell, feminist theologian
- Edmund Sears, Unitarian theologian
- Jeffrey L. Seglin, journalist, writer, and John F. Kennedy School of Government senior lecturer
- Saba Soomekh, professor and essayist
- Richard Tafel, founder Log Cabin Republicans, lobbyist, executive coach
- Conrad Tillard (born 1964), Baptist minister, radio host, author, civil rights activist, and politician
- Ross H. Trower, Chief of Chaplains of the U.S. Navy
- Jones Very, poet and essayist
- Liz Walker, journalist and pastor
- Christopher O. Ward, Executive Director of the Port Authority of New York and New Jersey
- Sarah Warn, Editor-in-Chief; founder of AfterEllen.com
- Leland Wilkinson, statistician and computer scientist
- Thomas Worcester, president of Regis College, Toronto
- Vanessa Zoltan, atheist chaplain

== Publications ==
=== Current ===
==== Harvard Divinity Bulletin ====
Harvard Divinity Bulletin is a glossy magazine published by Harvard Divinity School two times per calendar year. The magazine features nonfiction essays, opinion pieces, poetry, and reviews about religion and its relationship with contemporary life, art, and culture. The magazine often publishes the text of each year's Ingersoll Lecture on Human Immortality. It is mailed to a subscriber base of approximately 10,000. The magazine is sent free to Harvard Divinity School students, faculty, alumni, staff, and supporters; others are asked to subscribe. Past contributors have included Reza Aslan, Martine Batchelor, Sarah Sentilles, and Christian Wiman.

==== Harvard Theological Review ====
Founded in 1908, Harvard Theological Review is a quarterly journal that publishes original research in many scholarly and religious fields, including ethics, archeology, Christianity, Jewish studies, and comparative religious studies.

==== The Graduate Journal of Harvard Divinity School ====
Founded in 2006 as Cult/ure, The Graduate Journal of Harvard Divinity School is the print/online, student-run academic journal of Harvard Divinity School and the only graduate journal of religion at Harvard University. It publishes exemplary student scholarship in the areas of religious studies, ministry studies, and theology every year.

=== Past ===
==== Harvard Divinity Today ====
HD Today was an alumni magazine published three times per year by the HDS Office of Communications. It included original news articles, event listings, an alumni journal, and class notes. It ceased publication in spring 2012.

==== The Nave ====
The Nave was a newsletter of HDS student activities and events published from 1975 to 2007 by the HDS Office of Student Life. The newsletter transitioned from paper to online in 2002. The Nave included announcements of lectures, social events, important academic deadlines, and other matters.

==== The Wick ====
The Wick was a student-run journal for literary and creative works by the HDS community. The Wick published both published and unpublished writers of fiction, poetry, essays, photography, sermons, and creative non-fiction. It was last listed as a Harvard Divinity School student organization in the 2014–15 academic year.
