= Secular ethics =

Branch of moral philosophy

Secular ethics is a branch of moral philosophy in which ethics is based solely on human faculties such as logic, empathy, reason or moral intuition, and not derived from belief in supernatural revelation or guidance—a source of ethics in many religions. Secular ethics refers to any ethical system that does not draw on the supernatural, and includes humanism, secularism and freethinking. A classical example of literature on secular ethics is the Kural text, authored by the ancient Indian philosopher Valluvar.

Secular ethical systems comprise a wide variety of ideas to include the normativity of social contracts, some form of attribution of intrinsic moral value, intuition-based deontology, cultural moral relativism, and the idea that scientific reasoning can reveal objective moral truth (known as science of morality).

Secular ethics frameworks are not always mutually exclusive from theological values. For example, the Golden Rule or a commitment to non-violence, could be supported by both religious and secular frameworks. Secular ethics systems can vary within the societal and cultural norms of a specific time period, and may also be used by a person of any religious persuasion, including atheists.

== Tenets of secular ethics ==
Despite the width and diversity of their philosophical views, secular ethicists generally share one or more principles:

- Human beings, through their ability to empathize, are capable of determining ethical grounds.
- The well-being of others is central to ethical decision-making.
- Human beings, through logic and reason, are capable of deriving normative principles of behavior.
- This may lead to a behavior preferable to that propagated or condoned based on religious texts. Alternatively, this may lead to the advocacy of a system of moral principles that a broad group of people, both religious and non-religious, can agree upon.
- Human beings have the moral responsibility to ensure that societies and individuals act based on these ethical principles.
- Societies should, if at all possible, advance from a less ethical and just form to a more ethical and just form.

Many of these tenets are applied in the science of morality, the use of the scientific method to answer moral questions. Various thinkers have framed morality as questions of empirical truth to be explored in a scientific context. The science is related to ethical naturalism, a type of ethical realism.

In How Good People Make Tough Choices: Resolving the Dilemmas of Ethical Living, Rushworth Kidder identifies four general characteristics of an ethical code:

1. It is brief
2. It is usually not explanatory
3. Can be expressed in a number of forms (e.g. positive or negative, single words or a list of sentences)
4. Centers on moral values

=== Humanist ethics ===
Humanist ethics views that individuals can set their own ethics. The humanist ethics goal is a search for viable individual, social and political principles of conduct, judging them on their ability to enhance individual human responsibility.

The International Humanist and Ethical Union (IHEU) is the world-wide umbrella organization for those adhering to the Humanist life stance.

Humanism is a democratic and ethical life stance, which affirms that human beings have the right and responsibility to give meaning and shape to their own lives. It stands for the building of a more humane society through an ethic based on human and other natural values in the spirit of reason and free inquiry through human capabilities. It is not theistic, and it does not accept supernatural views of reality.

Humanism is known to adopt principles of the Golden Rule.

=== Secular ethics and religion ===
There are those who state that religion is not necessary for moral behavior at all. The Dalai Lama has said that compassion and affection are human values independent of religion: "We need these human values. I call these secular ethics, secular beliefs. There’s no relationship with any particular religion. Even without religion, even as nonbelievers, we have the capacity to promote these things."

Those who are unhappy with the negative orientation of traditional religious ethics believe that prohibitions can only set the absolute limits of what a society is willing to tolerate from people at their worst, not guide them towards achieving their best. In other words, someone who follows all these prohibitions has just barely avoided being a criminal, not acted as a positive influence on the world. They conclude that rational ethics can lead to a fully expressed ethical life, while religious prohibitions are insufficient.

That does not mean secular ethics and religion are mutually exclusive. In fact, many principles, such as the Golden Rule, are present in both systems, and some religious people, as well as some Deists, prefer to adopt a rational approach to ethics.

== Examples of secular ethical codes ==
=== Humanist Manifestos ===
The Humanist Manifestos are three manifestos, the first published in 1933, that outline the philosophical views and stances of humanists. Integral to the manifestos is a lack of supernatural guidance.

=== Alternatives to the Ten Commandments ===
There are numerous versions of Alternatives to the Ten Commandments

=== Girl Scout law ===
The Girl Scout law is as follows:

I will do my best to be

honest and fair,
friendly and helpful,
considerate and caring,
courageous and strong, and
responsible for what I say and do,

and to

respect myself and others,
respect authority,
use resources wisely,
make the world a better place, and
be a sister to every Girl Scout.

=== United States Naval Academy honor concept ===
"Midshipmen are persons of integrity: They stand for that which is right.

They tell the truth and ensure that the full truth is known. They do not lie.
They embrace fairness in all actions. They ensure that work submitted as their own is their own, and that assistance received from any source is authorized and properly documented. They do not cheat.
They respect the property of others and ensure that others are able to benefit from the use of their own property. They do not steal."

=== Minnesota Principles ===
The Minnesota Principles were proposed "by the Minnesota Center for Corporate Responsibility in 1992 as a guide to international business activities":

1. Business activities must be characterized by fairness. We understand fairness to include equitable treatment and equality of opportunity for all participants in the marketplace.
2. Business activities must be characterized by honesty. We understand honesty to include candor, truthfulness and promise-keeping.
3. Business activities must be characterized by respect for human dignity. We understand this to mean that business activities should show a special concern for the less powerful and the disadvantaged.
4. Business activities must be characterized by respect for the environment. We understand this to mean that business activities should promote sustainable development and prevent environmental degradation and waste of resources.

=== Rotary Four-Way Test ===
The Four-Way Test is the "linchpin of Rotary International's ethical practice." It acts as a test of thoughts as well as actions. It asks, "Of the things we think, say, or do":

1. Is it the truth?
2. Is it fair to all concerned?
3. Will it build goodwill and better friendships?
4. Will it be beneficial to all concerned?

=== Military codes ===
As the United States Constitution prohibits the establishment of a government religion, US military codes of conduct typically contain no religious overtones.

==== West Point Honor Code ====
The West Point honor code states that "A cadet will not lie, cheat, steal, or tolerate those who do." The non-toleration clause is key in differentiating it from numerous other codes.

== Nature and ethics ==
Whether or not the relationships between animals found in nature and between people in early human evolution can provide a basis for human morality is a persistently unresolved question. Thomas Henry Huxley wrote in Evolution and Ethics in 1893 that people make a grave error in trying to create moral ideas from the behavior of animals in nature. He remarked:

The practice of that which is ethically best — what we call goodness or virtue — involves a course of conduct which, in all respects, is opposed to that which leads to success in the cosmic struggle for existence. In place of ruthless self-assertion it demands self-restraint; in place of thrusting aside, or treading down, all competitors, it requires that the individual shall not merely respect, but shall help his fellows... It repudiates the gladiatorial theory of existence... Laws and moral precepts are directed to the end of curbing the cosmic process.

Famous biologist and writer Stephen Jay Gould has stated that "answers will not be read passively from nature" and "[t]he factual state of the world does not teach us how we, with our powers for good and evil, should alter or preserve it in the most ethical manner". Thus, he concluded that ideas of morality should come from a form of higher mental reason, with nature viewed as an independent phenomenon.

Evolutionary ethics is not the only way to involve nature with ethics. For example, there are ethically realist theories like ethical naturalism. Related to ethical naturalism is also the idea that ethics are best explored, not just using the lens of philosophy, but science as well (a science of morality).

== Key philosophers and philosophical texts ==
=== Epicurus ===
Epicurus (341–270 BCE), in his philosophy of Epicureanism, posits an ethics of pleasure based on the study of nature, and teaches that we should carry out our choices and rejections based on hedonic calculus. Epicureanism also teaches a curriculum of control of desires based on the hierarchy of desires: natural and necessary desires are top priority, natural yet unnecessary desires are secondary, and those that are neither natural nor necessary are dismissed. The main texts of its ethics are the 40 Principal Doctrines (Kyriai Doxai) and Epicurus' Letter to Menoeceus. As per Principal Doctrine 5, the ethical code of the School promotes living pleasantly, justly, prudently, and correctly.

=== Valluvar ===
Thiruvalluvar (before c. 5th century CE), a South Indian poet-philosopher and the author of the Kural, a non-denominational Classical Tamil work on secular ethics and morality, is believed to have lived between the 1st century BCE and the 5th century CE. While others of his time chiefly focused on the praise of God, culture and the ruler of the land, Valluvar focused on the moral behaviors of the common individual. Valluvar limits his theistic teachings to the introductory chapter of the Kural text, the "Praise of God." Throughout the text thereafter, he focuses on the everyday moral behaviors of an individual, thus making the text a secular one. Even in the introductory chapter, he refrains from mentioning the name of any particular god but only addresses God in generic terms as "the Creator," "the truly Wise One," "the One of eight-fold excellence," and so forth. Translated into about 40 world languages, the Kural text remains one of the most widely translated non-religious works in the world. Praised as "the Universal Veda," it emphasizes on the ethical edifices of non-violence, moral vegetarianism, casteless human brotherhood, absence of desires, path of righteousness and truth, and so forth, besides covering a wide range of subjects such as moral codes of rulers, friendship, agriculture, knowledge and wisdom, sobriety, love, and domestic life.

=== Holyoake ===
George Jacob Holyoake's 1896 publication English Secularism defines secularism thus:

"Secularism is a code of duty pertaining to this life, founded on considerations purely human, and intended mainly for those who find theology indefinite or inadequate, unreliable or unbelievable. Its essential principles are three: (1) The improvement of this life by material means. (2) That science is the available Providence of man. (3) That it is good to do good. Whether there be other good or not, the good of the present life is good, and it is good to seek that good."

Holyoake held that secularism should take no interest at all in religious questions (as they were irrelevant), and was thus to be distinguished from strong freethought and atheism. In this he disagreed with Charles Bradlaugh, and the disagreement split the secularist movement between those who argued that anti-religious movements and activism was not necessary or desirable and those who argued that it was.

=== Nietzsche ===
Nietzsche's many works spoke of a Master-Slave Morality, The Will to Power, or something stronger that overcomes the weaker and Darwinistic adaptation and will to live. Nietzsche expressed his moral philosophy throughout his collection of works; the most important of these to secular ethics being The Gay Science (in which the famous God is dead phrase was first used), Thus Spoke Zarathustra, Beyond Good and Evil and On The Genealogy of Morals.

According to Nietzsche, our understanding of cause and effect may be limited to a single will, an inclination that is identical to that of other living things. In this respect, Nietzsche's theory is more straightforward than Kant's since Nietzsche did manage clarify our sense of causality by considering simply the will to power, whereas Kant postulated two sorts of wills (free and unfree wills). We shouldn't "accept numerous forms of causality until the experiment of making do with a single one has been pushed to its farthest extent," according to Nietzsche, since the "conscience of method requires" it. The want to power appears to be practically beyond dispute, according to Nietzsche's formulation, and since causation is our ultimate certainty.

=== Kant ===
On ethics, Kant wrote works that both described the nature of universal principles and also sought to demonstrate the procedure of their application. Kant maintained that only a "good will" is morally praiseworthy, so that doing what appears to be ethical for the wrong reasons is not a morally good act. Kant's emphasis on one's intent or reasons for acting is usually contrasted with the utilitarian tenet that the goodness of an action is to be judged solely by its results. Utilitarianism is a hypothetical imperative, if one wants _____, they must do ______. Contrast this with the Kantian ethic of the categorical imperative, where the moral act is done for its own sake, and is framed: One must do ______ or alternatively, one must not do ______.

For instance, under Kantian ethics, if a person were to give money to charity because failure to do so would result in some sort of punishment from a god or Supreme Being, then the charitable donation would not be a morally good act. A dutiful action must be performed solely out of a sense of duty; any other motivation profanes the act and strips it of its moral quality.

=== Utilitarianism ===
Utilitarianism (from the Latin utilis, useful) is a theory of ethics that prescribes the quantitative maximization of good consequences for a population. It is a form of consequentialism. This good to be maximized is usually happiness, pleasure, or preference satisfaction. Though some utilitarian theories might seek to maximize other consequences, these consequences generally have something to do with the welfare of people (or of people and nonhuman animals). For this reason, utilitarianism is often associated with the term welfarist consequentialism.

In utilitarianism, it is the "end result" which is fundamental (as opposed to Kantian ethics discussed above). Thus using the same scenario as above, it would be irrelevant whether the person giving money to charity was doing so out of personal or religious conviction, the mere fact that the charitable donation is being made is sufficient for it to be classified as morally good.

== See also ==
- Outline of ethics
- Secular humanism – Life stance that embraces human reason, secular ethics, and philosophical naturalism
- Secular morality – Aspect of philosophy

== Bibliography ==
- Kidder, Rushworth M. Kidder (2003). How Good People Make Tough Choices: Resolving the Dilemmas of Ethical Living. New York: Harper. ISBN 0-688-17590-2.
- Kosower, M. (2018) Some Reflections on Torah, Science, Rationality, and Morality https://mkosower.academia.edu/research
- https://blogs.timesofisrael.com/some-reflections-on-torah-science-rationality-and-morality/
- https://www.secularethic.org/home-1
- https://archive.pagecentertraining.psu.edu/public-relations-ethics/ethical-decision-making/yet-another-test-page/the-difference-between-ethics-and-religion/
