= Herbert J. Taylor =

- Born: Herbert J. Taylor; 18 April 1893
- Died: 1 May 1978 (aged 85)
- Occupations: Business Executive, civic leader
- Known for: Founder of Christian Workers Foundation

Herbert J. Taylor (18 April 1893 – 1 May 1978) was an American business executive, civic leader and sponsor of Christian organizations. He co-founded the Christian Workers Foundation (CWF) in 1939. He served on the boards of several such institutions including Inter-Varsity Christian Fellowship (U.S.A.), Youth for Christ, Young Life, Fuller Seminary, Child Evangelism Fellowship, Christian Service Brigade, Pioneer Girls, and the Chicago Billy Graham Crusades. He was vice-chairman of the Price Adjustment Board of the War Department during World War II; the other positions he held were the presidency of Rotary International, 1954–55; directorship positions for the First National Bank of Barrington (Illinois) and the Chicago Federal Savings and Loan Association; and membership on the Board of Governors of the Illinois Crippled Children Society, 1941–42. Taylor also authored "The Four-Way Test", "The Ten Marks of a Good Citizen", "The Twelve Marks of a True Christian", and "God Has A Plan For You". He has been inducted into the American National Business Hall of Fame. He featured on the cover of Newsweek's 28 February 1955 issue.

A Methodist, he and his wife had two daughters, Gloria Beverly and Romona Estellene. He lived in Park Ridge, Illinois. Herbert Taylor died on 1 May 1978. At the time of his death he was chairman of board emeritus of Club Aluminium Products Inc.

== The Four-Way Test ==
In the early 1930s Taylor set out to save the Club Aluminum Products distribution company from bankruptcy. He believed himself to be the only person in the company with 250 employees who had hope. His recovery plan started with changing the ethical climate of the company. He explained

The first job was to set policies for the company that would reflect the high ethics and morals God would want in any business. If the people who worked for Club Aluminum were to think right, I knew they would do right. What we needed was a simple, easily remembered guide to right conduct - a sort of ethical yardstick- which all of us in the company could memorize and apply to what we thought, said and did.

I searched through many books for the answer to our need, but the right phrases eluded me, so I did what I often do when I have a problem I can't answer myself: I turn to the One who has all the answers. I leaned over my desk, rested my head in my hands and prayed. After a few moments, I looked up and reached for a white paper card. Then I wrote down the twenty-four words that had come to me: 1. Is it the truth? 2. Is it fair to all concerned? 3. Will it build goodwill and better friendships? 4. Will it be beneficial to all concerned?

I called it The Four-Way Test of the things we think, say or do.

== Adoption of the test by Rotary ==
In 1940s, when Taylor was an international director of Rotary, he offered the Four Way Test to the organization, and it was adopted by Rotary for its internal and promotional use. Never changed, the twenty four word Four Way Test remains today a central part of the permanent Rotary structure throughout the world, and is held as the standard by which all behaviour should be measured. The Four Way Test has been promoted around the world and is used in myriad forms to encourage personal and business ethical practices. Taylor gave Rotary International the right to use the test in the 1940s and the copyright in 1954. He retained the rights to use the test for himself, his Club Aluminum Company and the Christian Workers Foundation.

Non-profit organization positions
| Preceded by Joaquin Serratosa Cibils | President of Rotary International; 1954-1955 | Succeeded by A.Z. Baker |
