= Sarah Sentilles =

Sarah Sentilles is an American author. Her four books include Taught by America: A Story of Struggle and Hope in Compton, A Church of Her Own: What Happens When a Woman Takes the Pulpit, Breaking Up with God: A Love Story, and Draw Your Weapons. She has a Masters of Divinity and a doctorate in theology from Harvard Divinity School, studying under Gordon D. Kaufman. She has addressed the struggles and triumphs particularly evident within the paradigm concerning the ordination of women in Christian ministry. She previously taught at California State University, Channel Islands and currently teaches at Pacific Northwest College of Art, in Portland, Oregon. Sentilles describes herself as an agnostic.

Her book Draw Your Weapons won the 2018 PEN Award for Creative Nonfiction.

== Published works ==
- Taught by America: A Story of Struggle and Hope in Compton (Beacon, 2005)
- A Church of Her Own: What Happens When a Woman Takes the Pulpit (Harcourt, 2008)
- Breaking Up with God: A Love Story (HarperOne, 2011)
- Draw Your Weapons (Random House, 2017)
- Stranger Care: A Memoir of Loving What Isn't Ours (Random House, 2021)
