= Ten Commandments of Socialist Morality and Ethics =

Code of conduct

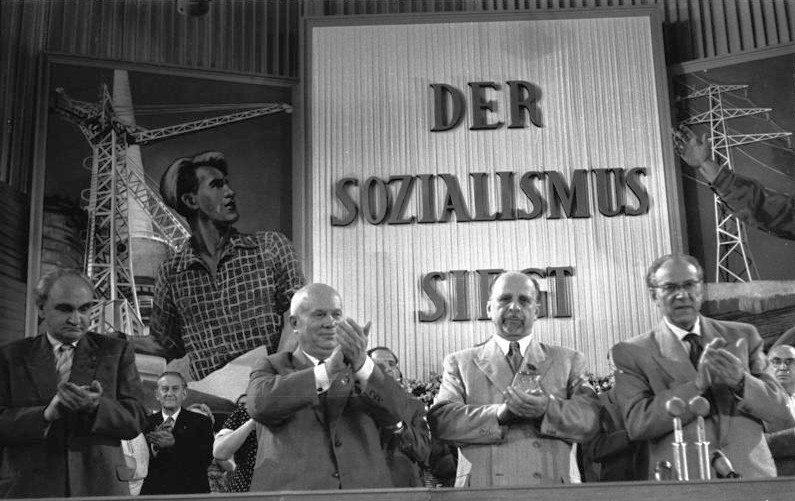
SED Party Congress 1958

The Ten Commandments of Socialist Morality and Ethics (German: Zehn Gebote der sozialistischen Moral und Ethik), also known as Ten Commandments for the New Socialist Man (German: 10 Gebote für den neuen sozialistischen Menschen), were proclaimed by Walter Ulbricht, then First Secretary of the Socialist Unity Party of Germany (SED), at the fifth SED Party Congress (July 10 to July 16, 1958). Formally based on the biblical Ten Commandments, they summarized the political duties of every citizen of the German Democratic Republic (GDR), were incorporated into the SED's party program by the sixth SED party congress in 1963, and remained in it until 1976.

== Ten Commandments ==
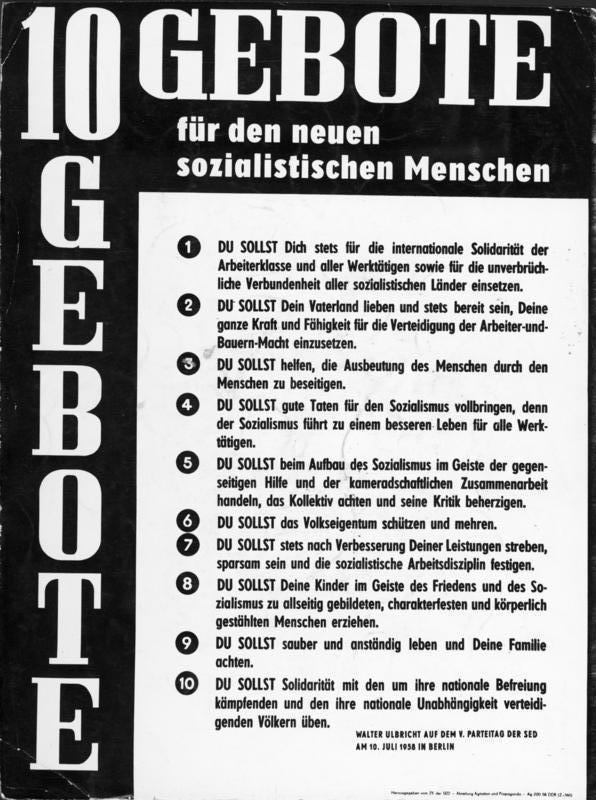
The Ten Commandments of Socialist Morality and Ethics (in German)

The commandments were:

1. You should always stand up for the international solidarity of the working class and all working people and for the unbreakable solidarity of all socialist countries.
2. You should love your fatherland and always be ready to use all your strength and ability to defend the workers' and peasants' power.
3. You should help to eliminate the exploitation of man by man.
4. You should do good deeds for socialism, because socialism leads to a better life for all working people.
5. You should act in the spirit of mutual help and comradely cooperation in building socialism, respect the collective and take its criticism to heart.
6. You should protect and increase the public property.
7. You should always strive to improve your performance, be thrifty and consolidate socialist labor discipline.
8. You should educate your children in the spirit of peace and socialism to be well-educated, strong-willed and physically strong people.
9. You should live clean and decent and respect your family.
10. You should show solidarity with the peoples struggling for national liberation and those defending their national independence.

== Political and historical context ==
The rules were related to the SED's church and cultural policies of the time, which were tightened after the East German uprising of 1953. They followed the youth initiation ceremony (Jugendweihe) introduced in 1954, at which they were often read out, and were intended to educate GDR citizens to a stronger work ethic and ideological atheism. The background to this was the Marxist-Leninist theory of the imminent death of religion under socialism, which had not materialized in the GDR despite the nationalized means of production. The SED leadership therefore tried to actively promote this process by seeking to replace church traditions with state ideology (similar attempts were made with "Socialist Marriage" and "Socialist Name Consecration"). In its view, the morality of individuals should bring the behavior of the working population into line with the "objective social requirements" it recognized.

In 1959, the FDGB introduced "brigades of socialist labor," which were intended to strengthen the workforces' willingness to perform. The initiators of the campaign made particular reference to the 5th, 6th and 7th commandments of Ulbricht's catalog of rules. When they were incorporated into the SED program, they were made binding as "socialist laws of morality and ethics" for all members as maxims for action. In 1976, the ninth SED Party Congress replaced all ten rules with the obligation to "observe the norms of socialist morality and ethics and to place social interests above personal ones."

However, they were hardly known among the GDR population and did not play a significant role in the public life of the GDR, but were mainly propagated within the party. Analogously, there were the "Commandments of the Young Pioneers" for children from the age of six to nine, and the "Laws of the Thälmann Pioneers" from the age of ten to fourteen.

== Literature ==
- Sandra Pingel-Schliemann: Zersetzen: Strategie einer Diktatur, Robert-Havemann-Gesellschaft, Berlin 2003. ISBN 3-9804920-7-9, S. 49.
- Heinz Mohnhaupt, Hans-Andreas Schönfeldt, Karl A. Mollnau Klostermann: Normdurchsetzung in osteuropäischen Nachkriegsgesellschaften (1944-1989), Band 5/2: Deutsche Demokratische Republik (1958-1989). Klostermann, Frankfurt am Main 2004. ISBN 3-465-03300-0.
