= The Four-Way Test =

Moral code by Rotary for decision-making

The Four-Way Test of the things we think, say or do is a test used by Rotarians world-wide as a moral code for personal and business relationships. The test can be applied to almost any aspect of life. The test was scripted by Herbert J. Taylor, an American from Chicago, as he set out to save the Club Aluminum Products Distribution Company from bankruptcy. It was later adopted by Rotary International, the global federation of Rotary service clubs.

== Genesis of four way test ==
In 1932, Herbert J. Taylor set out to save the Club Aluminum Products distribution company from bankruptcy. He believed himself to be the only person in the company of 250 employees who had hope. His recovery plan started with changing the ethical climate of the company. He explained: The first job was to set policies for the company that would reflect the high ethics and morals God would want in any business. If the people who worked for Club Aluminum were to think right, He knew they would do right. What was needed was a simple, easily remembered guide to right conduct - a sort of ethical yardstick- which all of us in the company could memorize and apply to what we thought, said and did. He searched through many books for the answer to his need, but the right phrases eluded him, so he did what he often did when facing a problem. He turned to the One who has all the answers. He leaned over his desk, rested his head in his hands and prayed. After a few moments, he looked up and reached for a white paper card. Then he wrote down the twenty-four words that changed the history and became synonyms for Rotary evolution.

1. Is it the truth?
2. Is it fair to all concerned?
3. Will it build goodwill and better friendships?
4. Will it be beneficial to all concerned?

It is called "The Four-Way Test of the things we think, say or do."

First testing it out on himself, he realized that the first question, "Is it the truth?" was barely applied in his business' day-to-day operations. After 60 days, Taylor decided to share those principles with the four department directors of his company (each of whom had a different religious faith). Those four directors validated his principles and rolled it out company-wide.

In 1932, Taylor's company was on the edge of bankruptcy. Twenty years later, by applying the Four-Way Test, the company repaid its debts and generously paid its shareholders.

== Adoption of the test by Rotary ==
In the 1940s, when Taylor was an international director of Rotary, he offered the Four Way Test to the organization, and it was adopted by Rotary for its internal and promotional use. Never changed, the twenty-four-word test remains today a central part of the permanent Rotary structure throughout the world, and is held as the standard by which all behavior should be measured. The test has been promoted around the world and is used in myriad forms to encourage personal and business ethical practices. Taylor gave Rotary International the right to use the test in the 1940s and the copyright in 1954. He retained the right to use the test for himself, his Club Aluminum Company, and the Christian Workers Foundation.

== Use by the Ghanaian judicial system ==
The test is displayed on billboards in court premises in Ghana.
