= Charles Gilchrist Adams =

American clergyman (1936–2023)

- Born: December 13, 1936; Detroit, Michigan, U.S.
- Died: November 29, 2023 (aged 86); Pontiac, Michigan, U.S.
- Education: University of Michigan; Harvard Divinity School
- Occupation: Minister
- Spouse: Agnes Adams
- Children: 2

Charles Gilchrist Adams (December 13, 1936 – November 29, 2023) was an American pastor who served as the first Nickerson Professor of the Practice of Ethics and Ministry at Harvard Divinity School from 2007 to 2012.

== Biography ==
Charles Gilchrist Adams was born on December 13, 1936, in Detroit, Michigan.

Adams earned a bachelor's degree from the University of Michigan and a Master of Divinity from Harvard Divinity School. He obtained a Rockefeller Fellowship of Harvard University, a Doctoral Fellowship of Union Theological Seminary and the Merrill Theological Fellowship of Harvard University.

Adams served as the senior pastor at Hartford Memorial Baptist Church in Detroit from 1969 to 2019.

In 1991 and 1992, Ebony magazine selected Adams as one of the 100 "Most Influential Black Americans". In 1993, Ebony listed Adams in their list of "The 15 Greatest Black Preachers".

Adams died from pneumonia and cardiac arrest on November 29, 2023, at the age of 86.
