= John Figdor =

Jonathan Figdor
- Education: Vassar College, Harvard Divinity School
- Occupation: Humanist Chaplain at Stanford University
- Website: www.atheistmindhumanistheart.com

John Figdor is a cryptocurrency fundraiser and former humanist chaplain at Stanford University, where he organized events and programs for students and community members in the San Francisco Bay Area. He was the first humanist chaplain at a university on the West Coast. As a humanist officiant, Figdor oversees non-theistic weddings, funerals, and baby-naming ceremonies.

== Early life and education ==
Figdor received his A.B. with honors in philosophy from Vassar College and a master's degree (M.Div.) in humanism and interfaith dialogue from Harvard Divinity School.

== Career ==
Figdor was an Organizing Fellow of the Humanist Chaplaincy at Harvard University and a former Assistant Humanist Chaplain at Harvard, working with Greg Epstein.

Figdor was appointed to his position at Stanford University in 2012, where he worked with humanists, atheists, and agnostics. The organization holds a variety of events, such as dinners, public lectures, art gallery tours, pub nights, discussions and debates, and game nights. Previous notable speakers have included Richard Dawkins.

In 2014, Figdor coauthored, together with Lex Bayer, the book Atheist Mind, Humanist Heart: Rewriting the Ten Commandments for the Twenty-First Century (Rowman & Littlefield, 2014). Figdor also organized the Rethink Prize, a crowdsourcing competition to rethink the Ten Commandments. The contest drew more than 2,800 submissions from 18 countries and 27 U.S. states. Winners were selected by a panel of judges in 2014.

Figdor is a former board member of the Secular Student Alliance. Figdor and his work have been featured in the San Francisco Chronicle, the Huffington Post, the Washington Post., Salon, CNN, and TIME.

In 2016, Figdor left Stanford to work at Empowerly as an account executive and account manager. In 2021, he joined Ideas Beyond Borders as the Director of West Coast Operations and Crypto Evangelist.
