= Birmingham Humanists =

The Birmingham Humanist Group was formed on 23 May 1962 at the Arden Hotel, New Street, Birmingham, England, at a meeting convened by Dr Anthony Brierley. It changed its name to Birmingham Humanists (Brum Hums) in 2000 and voted to become a Partner Group of the BHA, which changed its name to Humanists UK in 2017. It holds most of its meetings at the rooms of the Community Development trust in Moseley, Birmingham.

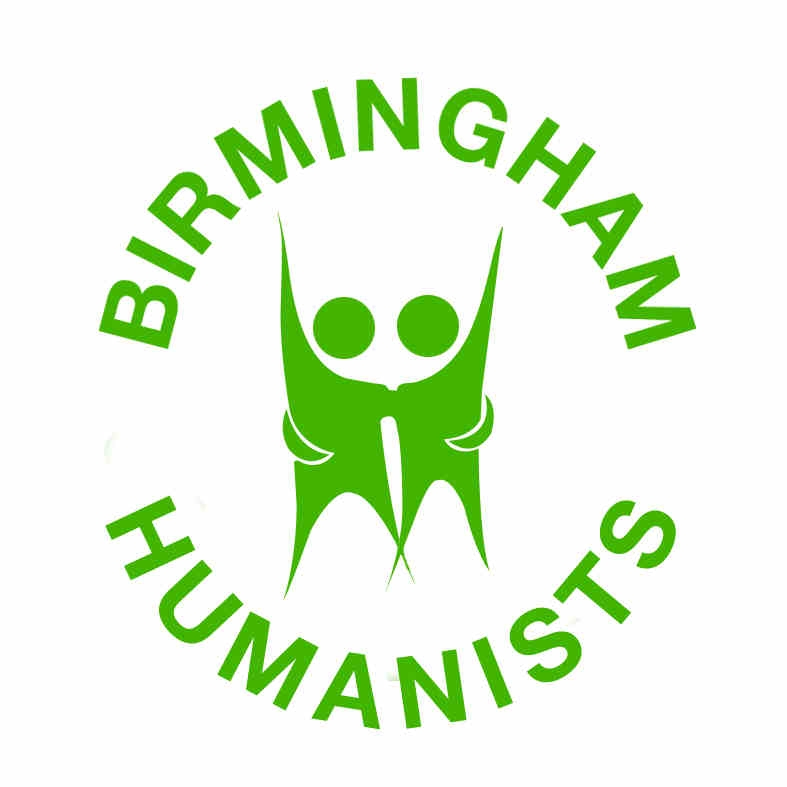
The Humanist symbol of a "happy human" modified so as to represent a group of two or more

== History ==
The group's first chairman was 22-year-old Colin Campbell, who later became Emeritus Professor of Sociology at York University.

In its early years, under the leadership of Fred Lyne, the group was active in the campaign to allow parents the legal right to remove their children from collective worship in schools.

In 1980 it held a joint public meeting with the newly formed humanist group for gay people at which one of its members, Dr Martin Cole, was the main speaker.

Later that decade it started producing a newsletter variously titled Bir-Hug, Hub, Birmingham Humanist and, most recently, News and Views.

Most years since 1990 the group has organised an annual day school or conference on a subject of topical interest, in addition to the regular monthly programme with speakers, discussions and visits. The group was involved in devising the content of the 1975 Birmingham Agreed Syllabus for Religious Education, which was the first to abandon the aim of Christian nurture and to require that a multi-faith approach, including non-religious 'stances for living' such as Humanism should begin in primary schools. However, the group is still not allowed representation on Birmingham SACRE, whose most recent syllabus makes no reference to secular Humanism in spite of the recommendations of the QCDA.

The group celebrated its fiftieth anniversary by holding a day conference: "Humanism: the Way Forward" on 7 June 2014, at which Colin Campbell, Tony Brierley, Pavan Dhaliwal, David Pollock and Kate Smurthwaite were the main speakers.

The group launched its first website in 2003 and is currently affiliated to the Gay and Lesbian Humanist Association (GALHA) and the National Secular Society (NSS). It also has close links with Skeptics in the Pub (Birmingham), the Asian Rationalist Society (Britain), Lichfield Walsall and South Staffordshire Humanist Group (LWASS), Aston University Atheist & Humanist Group, Walsall Humanists and University of Birmingham Atheist, Secular & Humanist Society (UBASH).

Documents relating to the early history of the group were deposited at the Bishopsgate Institute in London by Anthony Brierley in 2008, and papers of Dr Harry Stopes-Roe were placed there in 2015 by Adrian Bailey. Newsletters, programmes and AGM material going back to the 1970s were placed in the Local Studies Collection at the Library of Birmingham by John Edwards in 2017.

== Principles and beliefs ==
Humanism began as a movement within Christianity to "purify and renew" it however, today, humanists are a large and growing population of ethically concerned but non-religious people and the group is open to anyone who believes it is possible and desirable to live a good life without religious or superstitious beliefs and tries to make sense of life using reason, experience and shared human values.

As stated on the group's website, "a person can easily be both atheist and secular without being Humanist: Humanism requires the positive desire to help others, to improve the quality of life for others and also to accept that there are people who do have a religious belief, without insulting that belief or that person for their belief." Its members therefore believe that, since they have only one life, it is their responsibility to live it to the full, whilst trying to improve the quality of life for everyone. They appreciate that a truly secular society is the only way to give full equality to everybody, regardless of their religion or belief. They understand that human beings are part of the evolutionary process that has resulted in the immense diversity of life on earth, and deplore recent attempts to make intelligent design seem a scientifically credible alternative.

== Activities and charitable work ==
Since the millennium, the group has provided the Religious Studies departments of every secondary school in the West Midlands with a copy of the "Humanist Perspectives" teaching resource and has put free copies of The God Delusion into 60% of their libraries. Members have also given talks on Humanism to sixth form, and GCSE students and have taken up invitations to conduct the occasional school assembly. The group provides a scholarship at the Isaac Newton High School in Uganda and have given financial support to the Waris Dirie Foundation to aid its campaign against female genital mutilation and several charities involved in domestic violence prevention.

After the divisions and acrimony created during the Brexit referendum in 2016, member Adrian Bailey created a "Love Your Neighbour" scheme to encourage the people of Birmingham to do small acts of kindness for their neighbours to show that the city had not given in to hate and division. The campaign was joined by various faith and community leaders and was backed by the local press. In 2018, members of the group were quick to lend support to Andrew Moffat and the "No Outsiders" inclusivity and equality programme and tried to counteract the misinformed homophobic protests outside several Birmingham schools.

On 26 September 2021 the group held a special meeting to celebrate Jane Wynne Willson stepping down from the committee after around 40 years of service and at this event the Jane Wynne Willson Celebrant Training Bursary was announced, to be awarded annually to help more people in the West Midlands, especially those from low income socio-economic backgrounds and currently underrepresented groups, train as Humanist celebrants.

== Library ==
The group has a large collection of books and some DVDs on humanism, agnosticism, atheism, religion, philosophy, politics and sociology which are available to its members. A catalogue of titles can be found on their website.

== Ceremonies ==
Several members of the group are celebrants, accredited by the BHA, able to conduct secular ceremonies to mark important events in the lives of the non-religious in the Midlands. Humanist celebrants are not yet recognised in law for weddings in England and Wales and so most couples will need a registry office ceremony as well as their Humanist wedding. Most non-religious ceremonies are funerals, which to Humanists represent the chance to celebrate a life rather than mourn a death. Baby namings, the non-religious equivalent of christenings, and same sex affirmations are becoming increasingly popular with those who chose to live without religion in their lives.

== Notable members ==
A number of famous Humanists have been members of the group.

- Martin Cole (1931-2015), the group's president in the 1990s; instrumental in founding the Birmingham (later British) Pregnancy Advisory Service; producer of the sex education film Growing Up
- Trevor Denning (1923–2009), former group treasurer; one of the founders of the Birmingham Artists Committee; influential in the foundation of the Ikon Gallery in Birmingham
- Michael Goulder (1927–2010), renounced his orders as a priest in 1981 yet became Professor of Biblical Studies at Birmingham University in 1991; a president of the group. With rare expertise in both the Old and New Testaments, he was a proponent of the Farrer hypothesis, which postulated that the first gospel was that of Mark and that this was then used as source material by the authors of the Matthew and Luke gospels.
- Harry Stopes-Roe (1924-2014), was a former president of the group; developed the concept of Humanism as a life stance in the 1970s as part of an attempt to establish a clear identity for Humanism, in order to gain recognition and respect for non-religious beliefs so that their study might begin in the primary school; a UK signatory of the Secular Humanist Declaration issued in 1980; a vice president of the BHA
- Jane Wynne Willson, a vice president of the BHA; has been an officer of Birmingham Humanists for over 30 years; co-chair of International Humanist and Ethical Union from 1993 to 1996, and its vice-president until 2002; best known for her popular book "Funerals Without God" and others relating to non-religious naming and wedding ceremonies, and on bringing up children
- William Wynne Willson (1932–2010), mathematician, author, pianist and musical website designer

== See also ==
- All-Party Parliamentary Humanist Group
- International Humanist and Ethical Union
- Leicester Secular Society
- National Secular Society
- Gay and Lesbian Humanist Association
- North East Humanists
