= Support base of the National Front (UK) =

The Support base of the National Front is the base from which the National Front, a far-right political party in the United Kingdom, drew its support. There was regional variation in the levels of support that the NF received during the 1970s, reflected both in the share of the vote (1%) it gained and the size and number of its branches Its strength was centred heavily in England; its support was far weaker in Wales, Scotland, and Northern Ireland. In England, its support clustered along the South Coast and in the cities of London and Birmingham. This distribution had "strong parallels" with the earlier support of the BUF.

== Finances ==
The National Front was not open about its finances, but often stressed that it was short of funds and required more money to finance its operations. It is likely that in its heyday, it had just enough money to pay for its two full-time officials, three head office secretaries, and party expenses. Walker noted that in 1974, the NF raised at least £50,000. That same year, it went into debt to finance its electoral campaigns.

Its central funds came from several main sources: membership dues, the sale of its publications, donations, and lotteries. During the 1970s, branches were given financial targets they were expected to attain through selling Spearhead and the NF's newssheet Britain First. Branches also held jumble sales, totes, and social events as a means of raising funds. Branches were not held responsible for providing funds for the party's headquarters, but were expected to finance their own candidates in election campaigns. The party also succeeded in raising additional funds during its rallies and meetings, where donations were specifically requested from the attendees. It had several wealthy supporters who provided donations of up to £20,000, including sympathisers in apartheid-era South Africa, and in France. It also received funds from individuals in the Arab world to finance the publication of material espousing anti-Semitic conspiracy theories and Holocaust denial.

== Membership ==
=== Numbers ===
The NF faced a high turnover in its membership. In 1977, Walker described the party's membership as "like a bath with both taps running and the plughole empty. Members pour in and pour out." Fielding echoed this, stating that the NF's "stable membership" was lower than the number of people who have "passed through" it; Taylor suggested that during the 1970s, "at least 12,000" people joined and then left the party.

The Front refused to officially disclose the number of members that it had. Thurlow suggested that "the most reliable estimates" were those produced by the anti-fascist investigatory magazine Searchlight. Following its establishment, the NF claimed to have 4,000 members in 1968, and in February 1974 a branch chairman claimed that it had 20,000 members. Fielding suggested that it probably had about 21,000 members in early 1975, of whom 6,000 to 8,000 were "paper members" who had not renewed their membership subscriptions but not officially terminated their membership. Searchlight claimed that from its origins with 4,000 members in 1968, the party reached a peak membership of 17,500 in 1972, which had declined to 10,000 in 1979, to 3,148 in 1984, and to 1,000 in January 1985. An estimate of party membership in 1989 put adherents of the Flag Group at about 3,000 and of the Strasserite faction at about 600. Thurlow noted that even at its peak in the 1970s, the Front's membership was still only half that of the BUF during its 1930s heyday.

=== Profile ===
While the party attracts significant numbers of working-class people the role they play in the branch is contingent on their political ability and zeal, and there is no doubt that it is those drawn from the upper ranks of the working class who predominate... It is noticeable that the more sedentary members at branch level are those drawn from the lower middle-class and the few remaining elderly upper middle-class members.

— Fielding, on the class composition of NF branches, 1981

No adequate sociological sampling of NF members took place, but interviews with members were carried out during the 1970s by Taylor, Fielding, and Billig. Max Hanna noted that as of 1973, most NF members were "from the skilled working class and lower-middle class" but that there was variation according to branch. Fielding observed that most party members during the late 1970s were working-class, but that the party's South Coast branches had a higher concentration of lower middle-class members. He observed that party activism was generally carried out by upper working and lower middle-class members rather than by their lower working-class and upper middle-class counterparts.

Fielding noted that the party contained individuals of all age ranges, although added that certain branches had a concentration of retirees. He observed a greater number of men in their thirties or fifties rather than their forties, suggesting that the latter were typically too preoccupied with raising families to involve themselves heavily in NF matters. Hanna also described "men in their thirties" as the party's main cohort. The male numerical dominance was in common with most UK political parties in the period, although the Front differed from these other parties in cultivating an image of "overwhelming masculinity" and "virulent machismo".

NF members were sociologically regarded as political deviants, and thus parts of the cultic milieu. Fielding's interviews with NF members in the 1970s led him to conclude that "there is something exceptional about the NF member, and particularly about the activist", for they differed from other members of society in their willingness to join a politically extreme group. Fielding found that NF members were concerned about their image and sensitive to ideas that they were "fascistic" or "cranky", instead thinking of themselves as "patriots" or "nationalists". He found them more accepting of the term "racist", with some referring to themselves as such. He noted that race was the main issue that led members to joining the Front, and that they generally perceived their racial ideas to be "common sense". He added that members made "harsh expressions of prejudice" against non-white Britons, citing one woman member who called on her branch to "get out there and smash that bleedin' wog filth", a group she juxtaposed with "respectable people like us".

A variant of the National Front flag

Fielding found that "ordinary members feel uneasy about Britain's present political life but cannot express why this is". A common perception among members was that life had changed for the worse in Britain and they often used the expression: "the country is going to the dogs". As evidence, they cited what they believed were declining standards of living, the erosion of British identity, and the collapse of the British Empire. Members typically looked with pride on the UK's past military and colonial exploits, and wanted the country to return to a preeminent position on the world stage. There was a widespread perception among NF members that Britain's political leaders were corrupt and cruel, and a tendency toward believing and espousing conspiracy theories.

Fielding believed that some of the membership were "motivated by a search for community and reassurance in a world they find difficult to understand". For some, joining the NF was a psychological act of defiance against society, while many had joined because their friends and relatives had done so. Fielding suggested that the NF's moral indignation regarding perceived slackers and anti-social elements had particular appeal for upper working and lower middle-class Britons because these were the sectors of society which felt that they worked hardest for the least reward. The large number of individuals who joined and soon left the party might in part be due to the fact that many had joined on the basis of its populist appeals against immigration, only to express shock or dismay upon discovering its underlying fascist ideology. In other cases, individuals may have left because they felt that the hardship they encountered—ostracisation by friends and colleagues, job losses, verbal abuses, and on rare occasion physical assault—became too much to endure, particularly as the party's fortunes declined in the latter 1970s.

During the 1970s, the NF consistently attempted to attract youth, having formed specific sub-groups to focus on this campaign. Many of the youth attracted to the group may have done so as a form of youthful rebellion, enjoying the "shock value" that party membership offered; in this they had similarities with the contemporary punk movement of the late 1970s. Ryan Shaffer stated that the party's shift away from traditional campaigning during the 1980s and its growing affiliation with neo-Nazi youth groups resulted in its appeal becoming restricted to "mostly young people".

== Voter base ==
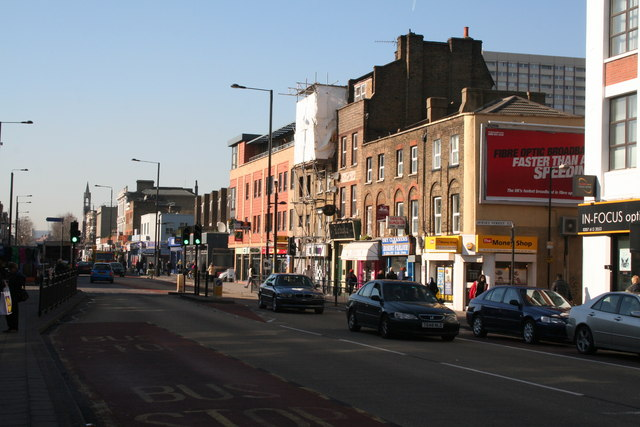
During its 1970s heyday, one of the strongest areas of National Front support was Bethnal Green (pictured), part of London's East End.

The NF's electoral support was overwhelmingly urban and English, with little support in rural parts of England or in Wales, Scotland, and Northern Ireland. According to Walker, the 1974 election results suggested that at the time the NF's electoral heartlands were in London's East End and in Inner London's north-east suburbs. He noted that it typically gained much support from "respectable working-class" areas, where many traditional Labour voters who felt let down by Labour governments were attracted by its racial appeals. In 1978, the psephologist Michael Steed argued that comparing the voting data of the NF to older far-right parties suggested that "there has been a very constant level of potential N.F. support for at least ten and perhaps twenty years, simply awaiting an opportunity to express itself."

Examining the party's East End support in greater depth, the sociologist Christopher T. Husbands argued that NF support was not evenly distributed across the region, but was constrained to a "relatively restricted area", the two or three square miles containing Bethnal Green, Shoreditch, Hoxton, and Haggerston. He noted that even in urban strongholds such as these, "only a minority even of their white residents were sympathetic" to the NF. A 1978 survey in the East End by New Society found that while most white residents thought the immigration rate too high, many related positive encounters and friendships with Afro-Caribbean and Asian migrants and opposed the NF. A number mocked the Front—one called them "a load of ponces" who did not want to work, another satirised "all the blokes in their Action Man gear"—although were cautious about doing so publicly, fearing violent retaliation.

A 1977 survey conducted by Essex University found that 8% of those polled were likely to vote for the Front, and that the party had "strong support amongst the working class, the young and the poorly educated". This survey found that support for the party was strongest in the East Midlands (10%), followed by London (8%), East Anglia (7%), the West Midlands (6%), and then Yorkshire and Humberside (6%). A report published in 1980 instead found that Greater London and the West Midlands were the NF's greatest areas of support, together making up 48% of its national vote share. However, this study similarly found a strong link to class, with 72% of NF supporters being working class; it noted that support was "somewhat stronger among the skilled working class than among the semi- and unskilled workers." This study also found that 71% of the NF's support came from men. This close link with majority male support was also evident in other far-right movements of the period, such as the George Wallace Movement in the United States, and echoed the disproportionate number of men who worked for the party.

The 1980 study also examined views of the NF among the broader British electorate. This found that 6% would "seriously consider" voting for the NF, while 1% would "strongly agree" with the idea of voting for it. Two thirds of respondents believed that the NF stirred up racial tensions to advance its own cause, 64% believed that there was a Nazi element to the party, and 56% believed that the NF wanted Britain to become a dictatorship. However, Taylor suggested that many of those who voted for the NF did so not because they wanted to see the UK become a fascist state but because they were attracted by its anti-immigrant appeals. During the 1970s, both Tyndall and NF members reiterated the belief that "all decent people" agreed with their policies; they thus sought to eschew the idea that the NF was extraordinary or extreme in its views.

=== Explanations ===
Many members of a 'dominant' group, the 'white' English, felt 'threatened' by a new group, the 'coloured' English or coloured immigrants, who, it was thought, were variously destroying their cultural and national uniqueness, or competing unfairly for resources, particularly employment and housing... It was only when... some members of the 'dominant' group who perceived themselves to be under 'attack' felt that the Conservative Party had betrayed their interests, that the extreme right was able to emerge with widespread support.

— Political scientist Stan Taylor, 1982

Various explanations for the NF's 1970s electoral growth held that it was impacted by the levels of non-white immigration into an area. In 1976, Webster claimed that his party did best "when an immigrant problem is in sight nearby", in white-dominated areas close to migrant communities. One argument was that areas with large non-white immigrant communities were most susceptible to NF support; according to this view, the higher the non-white population, the higher the resentment among local whites and the greater the support for the NF. An alternate explanation is that the NF did particularly well in areas where the non-white population was moderately sized rather than large; according to this, local whites turned to the NF because they were fearful that the area's non-white population would grow larger, particularly if neighbouring areas already had large non-white populations.

On examining voting data from the 1977 Greater London Council election, the political scientist Paul Whiteley argued that the NF picked up on the votes of alienated working-class individuals by "providing simple answers to complex problems". He argued that the NF's vote share was best explained by the "working-class authoritarianism" phenomenon examined in the United States by S. M. Lipset. Christopher Husbands instead believed that "local working-class cultures" were "the crucial factor for understanding some pro-NF susceptibility". He cited earlier studies indicating that "territorial sensitivity" was an element of English working-class culture, with this "localism" manifesting as corollaries of "parochialism and a sensitivity to supposed threat". He argued that this led many working-class English people to create personal identities based on their neighbourhood rather than their profession, leaving many more susceptible to far-right appeals based on location rather than leftist ones based on workplace solidarity. He argued that there were parallels with the Netherlands, where urban working-class communities had also expressed support for the far-right, although not in France, Germany, or Italy, where the urban proletariat had not offered substantial support for far-right parties.
