= Jane Wynne Willson =

Jane Wynne Willson (born 1933) is a British teacher, writer, campaigner and humanist. She was a vice-president and is now a patron of Humanists UK.

== Biography ==
Willson worked as a teacher, first becoming actively involved in the secular humanist movement when her oldest child was attending school.

She established local humanist groups in Bristol and Cheltenham, and has since been an officer of Birmingham Humanists for over 30 years. She was a member of the BHA Executive Committee from 1966 to 1972, and again from 1988 to 1994, chairing the committee from 1989 to 1992. She was a Chair of the International Humanist and Ethical Union from 1993 to 1996, and its Vice-President until 2002. She served as a Director of the Rationalist Press Association. Her mother was a barrister, Theodora Llewelyn Davies.

In September 2021, the Jane Wynne Willson Celebrant Training Bursary was announced, to be awarded annually to help more people in the West Midlands, especially those from low income socio-economic backgrounds and currently underrepresented groups, train as Humanist celebrants.

== Books ==
Willson's books on non-religious ceremonies, such as funerals, weddings, and baby namings include:

- Sharing the Future (first published as To Love and to Cherish, 1988, several later editions)
- Funerals Without God (first published 1989, several later editions; ISBN 0-901825-14-X)
- New Arrivals (first published 1991; later revision with Robert Ashby, 1999)
- Parenting without God: Experiences of a Humanist Mother (1998)
- The Chain of Love - A Victorian Family History (2007)
