= Calthorpe Clinic =

Abortion clinic in Birmingham, England

The Calthorpe Clinic, (now Marie Stopes International Birmingham), was an abortion clinic in Edgbaston, Birmingham, England that first opened in 1969. It was the first clinic in the United Kingdom opened exclusively for abortions. It was erected at Arthur Road, in a building that was previously an old people's home and started out with 18 beds. The clinic provided surgical and medical terminations for thousands of women each year. By the 2000s, it also provided sterilisation, and vasectomy services, and was providing terminations at least through the 20th week of gestation.

In 1971, the cost of an abortion at the Calthorpe Clinic was £65, including the initial consultations, tests, counselling and overnight accommodation.

By 2007, the establishment was the single largest abortion clinic in the UK with an annual caseload of around 10,000 clients. Approximately 85% of the caseload was on contract to the NHS. Due to the relative proximity of Birmingham to Ireland, and the fact that abortion was illegal in Ireland, the clinic also had many Irish clients. It was approved by the Secretary of State for Health under the Abortion Act 1967 and regulated by the Healthcare Commission and had to meet the national minimum standards set by the Care Standards Act 2000.

In February 2012, allegations were made by The Daily Telegraph newspaper that the clinic would provide terminations when the reason given was a desire not to have a child of a particular gender. In January and February 2012, the Care Quality Commission had made unannounced inspections of the clinic, as a result of which the clinic was warned, and a doctor suspended. The West Midlands Police were also asked to investigate.

By May 2012, the name and management of the service had changed to Marie Stopes International Birmingham.

== See also ==
- Martin Cole (sexologist)
