= George Neil Jenkins =

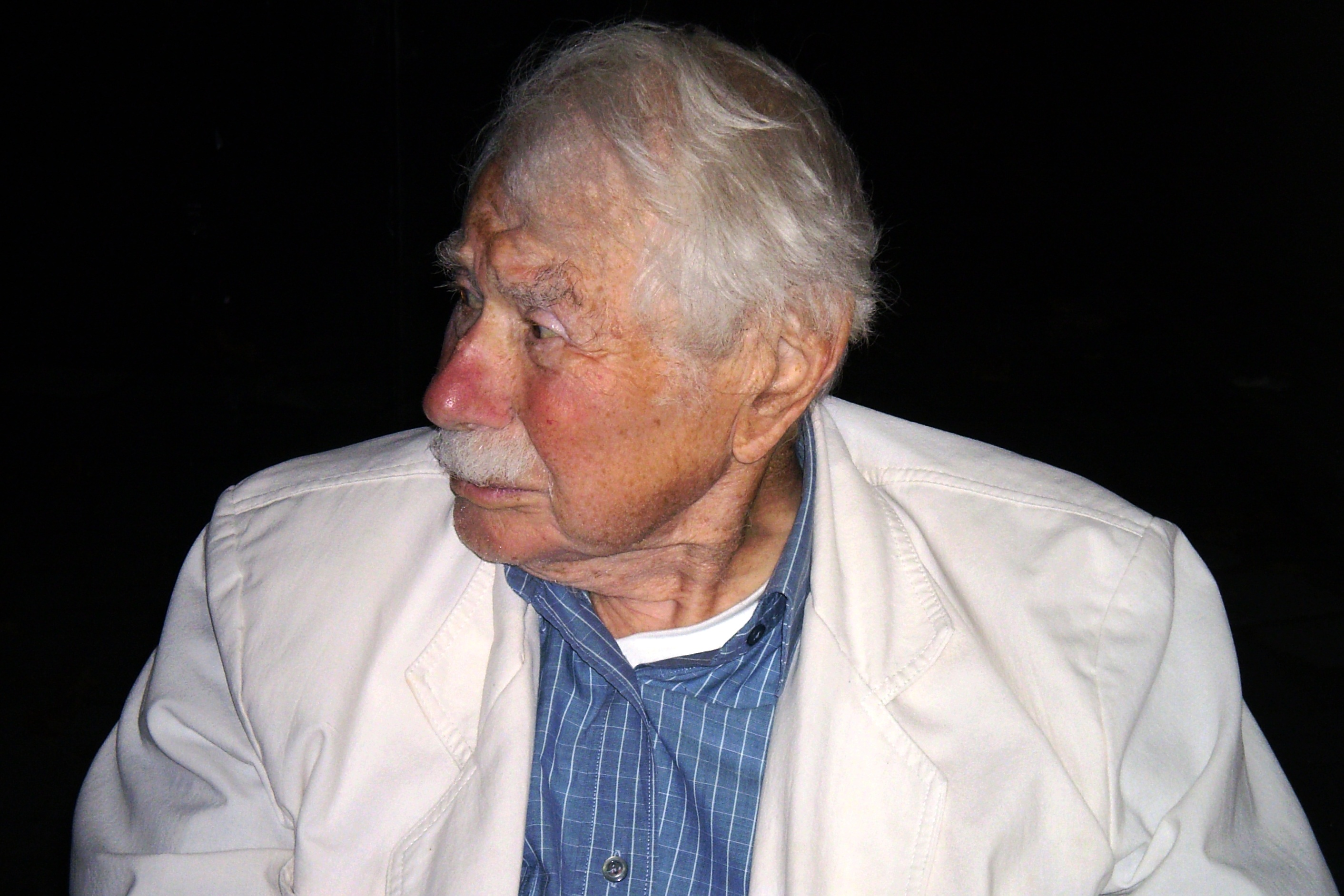
Professor Neil Jenkins.

George Neil Jenkins (23 October 1914 – 14 October 2007) was Professor of Oral Physiology at the Dental School of the University of Newcastle upon Tyne for most of his distinguished career. He concentrated his research on the prevention of tooth decay, becoming a world expert in oral hygiene. He was a lifelong humanist, and President of the North East Humanists group.

== Career ==
After becoming one of the first students in the country to read for a degree in biochemistry, Jenkins gained a PhD at Cambridge, and by the early 1940s was teaching physiology to doctors at St. Bartholomew's Hospital. In 1946 Jenkins came to Newcastle upon Tyne and was for ten years Nuffield Lecturer in Physiology to dental students at the University of Newcastle upon Tyne, a role which he pioneered. Subsequently, Jenkins was appointed Head of the new Department of Oral Physiology. Retiring in 1980, Jenkins continued to be engaged in teaching and research. As well as ongoing work in this country, Jenkins acted as visiting professor for varying periods of time at the universities of Chicago, Toronto, Minneapolis, Edmonton, and, on three occasions, Trinidad.

One of Neil Jenkins's major study areas was work looking at the beneficial effect that eating cheese has on tooth decay. During the Second World War, he was involved in studies to determine the amount of chalk which would have to be added to the bread in Britain, in order to avoid calcium deficiency in the population.

Neil was an active researcher, but he was also keen on making known the implications of his research. He has always been an ardent supporter of water fluoridation, giving many public presentations on the topic. Regarding this subject he also appeared on the BBC's Panorama. Working with R. L. Speirs, Neil found that the surface of tooth enamel is high in fluoride, a finding which never received the recognition it deserves, as it went unpublished in any dental journal. He also looked at the effects fluoride in water had on teeth, even going so far as to give himself tooth decay to show that it could be cured using fluoride. He lectured on the subject of water fluoridation across the world, becoming a key contributor to a controversial debate. During the Second World War, he served as a nutritional advisor to the government. Jenkins also acted as an associate editor of the journal Archives of Oral Biology for 15 years.

As a result of his experience of being taught by Jenkins at the University of Newcastle upon Tyne, Dr. Israel Kleinberg was stimulated to push for the creation of the first department of oral biology in the world and the first PhD program in Oral Biology, at the newly founded dental school at the University of Manitoba in 1958. This was a revolutionary change for dentistry, in that most of the faculty members teaching the basic sciences to dental students were physically located in the dental school, taught only dental students, and were encouraged to carry out research on dentally-related problems. Several other new dental schools subsequently followed this lead, and oral biology is now a well established discipline. In recognition of his contributions to dental education and research, which have had such a profound influence worldwide, Jenkins was awarded an honorary DSc by the University of Manitoba in 1983. Outside of his research and teaching work, Neil was involved in such organizations as the United Nations Association and the World Health Organization. He was a keen student of environmentalism and became concerned at the damage the human race is doing to our environment. In 1972 he raised fears about the environmental impact that Concorde would have, and was one of the first to question the environmental impact of flying.

== Humanism ==
In the 1950s, Jenkins joined the Tyneside Humanists Group, later to become North East Humanists, becoming President at an early stage of his membership. Neil was an active member of the association, making regular contributions to their monthly meetings. In addition to his scientific publications, Neil was joint author, with Alfred Hobson, of the book "Modern Humanism". Neil also gave funeral orations for those who requested non-religious ceremonies, and was an active member of the Friends of Jesmond Dene and the Society for Psychical Research.

Neil died on Sunday 14 October 2007. His humanist funeral was held at West Road Crematorium, Newcastle upon Tyne, on Monday 29 October 2007. It was attended by family, friends, colleagues and members of North East Humanists.

Neil was predeceased by his wife Olive and survived by his children Oliver and Hilbre.

== Published work ==
- "Physiology and Biochemistry of the Mouth" by G. Neil Jenkins
- "Prevention of Dental Caries (Inaugural Lecture Series)" by G. Neil Jenkins
- "Fluorides in Caries Prevention" (Dental Practitioner Handbook), 3rd. Edition, 1991, Edited by G. Neil Jenkins, Andrew J.Rugg-Gunn and J. J. Murray.
- "Modern Humanism" by Alfred Hoburn and Neil Jenkins. First published in 1989 by Dene Books and updated by NEH.
