= Colin Campbell (sociologist) =

British sociologist (born 1940)

- Born: 1940 (age 85–86); Sutton Coldfield, England
- Occupations: Professor, author

Academic background
- Education: University of London (BSc., PhD)

Academic work
- Discipline: Sociologist
- Institutions: University of York
- Notable ideas: Cultic milieu. The Craft Consumer

Colin Campbell (born 1940) is a British sociologist known for his work on cultural change, consumerism, religion, and Weberian action theory.

== Career ==
Colin Campbell was born in 1940 in Sutton Coldfield, England. He was a founder member of Birmingham Humanists. He is married and has two children.

He graduated with a BSc. in Economics from the University of London in 1961. Afterwards he worked as a teacher at the City of Birmingham College of Commerce. In 1964, he moved to York as an assistant lecturer, and received his PhD in 1968 from the University of London. He is Professor Emeritus at the University of York, with 60 years of service. From 1974 to 1976 he was a Visiting Professor at Simon Fraser University. In 1994 he was a Research Fellow at Nuffield College, Oxford; In 1998 he was Visiting Research Fellow at the Institute for Cultural Pluralism at the Candido Mendes University in Rio de Janeiro. In 1999, he was Visiting Research Fellow at the Australian National University.

== Cultic milieu ==
In a 1972 essay, Campbell coined the theory of the "cultic milieu". It refers to a social space where various fringe beliefs and countercultural ideas coexist, often opposing mainstream beliefs. It encompasses a range of unconventional religious, political, and philosophical ideologies that can influence one another. His initial development of the idea largely focused on the manifestations of "cultic" religious groups in the 1960s and 1970s, which dissolved only to reform in different ways.

== The Myth of Social Action ==
In a 1996 book, The Myth of Social Action, Campbell criticizes what he argues was the dominant "social situationist" approach in sociological theory. Describing social situationism as a paradigm holding that "actions can be identified only by reference to the social context in which they occur," Campbell argues that this central tenet is an amalgamation of several traditions that gained prominence in sociology, including the linguistic turn, social interactionism, and the criticism of motives in cultural theory (e.g., Mills). Campbell claims that this paradigm restricts sociology's attention without justification, and he calls for alternative paradigms that focus on human action in its full breadth.

== Publications ==
- Campbell, Colin. (2025). In Search of the Real Max Weber: a Dynamic Interpretive Approach to Action and Agency. Palgrave Macmillan.
- Campbell, Colin. (2021). Consumption and Consumer Society: The Craft Consumer and Other Essays. Palgrave Macmillan.
- Campbell, Colin (6 July 2019). Has Sociology Progressed?: Reflections of an Accidental Academic. Springer. ISBN 978-3-030-19978-4.
- Campbell, Colin. (2007) The Easternization of The West: A Thematic Account Of Cultural Change in the Modern Era. Paradigm Publishers.
- Campbell, Colin, Barbossa, Livia, (eds) (2006) Cultura, Consumo and Identidade. Published by FGV.
- Campbell, Colin, Falk, Pasi (eds) (1997) The Shopping Experience. Sage.
- Campbell, Colin (1996). The Myth of Social Action. Cambridge; New York: Cambridge University Press. ISBN 0-521-55079-3.
- Campbell, Colin (1987) The Romantic Ethic and the Spirit of Modern Consumerism. Basil Blackwell.
  - Italian edition, (1992) published by Edizioni Lavoro.
  - Slovenian edition, (2001) published by Studia Humanitatis.
  - Portuguese edition, (2002) published by Paulo Rocco.
  - Chinese edition, (2005) published by National Academy for Educational Research.
  - Korean Edition, (2010) published by The National Research Foundation of Korea.
  - New Extended Edition. (2018) published by Palgrave Macmillan.
- Campbell, Colin. (1971) Toward A Sociology of Irreligion. London: Macmillan.
  - Spanish Edition published, (1977) by Technos.
  - Revised Edition, (2013) published Alcuin Academics.

== Selected articles ==
- Campbell, Colin. (2024). `The Cultic Milieu and the Spiritual Turn: The Need for Theoretical Revision. Pp 59-86 In Dick Houtman and Galen Watts (eds.), The Shape of Spirituality: The Public Significance of a New Religious Formation. Columbia University Press.
- Campbell, Colin. (2009). 'Distinguishing the Power of Agency from Agentic Power: A Note on Weber and the “Black Box” of Personal Agency' Sociological Theory 27 (4): 407-418.
- Campbell, Colin. (2006). Do Today’s Sociologists Really Appreciate Weber’s essay The Protestant Ethic and Spirit of Capitalism?’ Sociological Review 54 (2) 207-223.
- Campbell, Colin. (1996) `Half-Belief and the paradox of instrumental activism: A theory of modern superstition, British Journal of Sociology 47 (1) 151-165
- Campbell, Colin. (1995). "Conspicuous Confusion? A Critique of Veblen's Theory of Conspicuous Consumption" Sociological Theory 13 1, 37-47.
- Campbell, Colin. (1992). `In Defence of the Traditional Concept of Action in Sociology’, The Journal for the Theory of Social Behaviour, 22, 1, 1-23.
- Campbell, Colin. (1982). `A Dubious Distinction? An Inquiry into the Value and Use of Merton's concepts of Latent and Manifest Function’, American Sociological Review 47, 29-44.
- Campbell, Colin. (1980) Things We said Today: the complete lyrics and a concordance to the Beatles’ lyrics 1962-1970 (with Allan Murphy). Ann Arbor, MI The Pierian Press.
- Campbell, Colin. (1972) `The Cult, the Cultic Milieu and Secularisation’ A Sociological Yearbook of Religion in Britain 5, 119-36. Reprinted in Steve Bruce (ed.) (1995) The Sociology of Religion Vol II (The International Library of Critical Writings in Sociology), Elgar. And in Jeffrey Kaplan and Helene Lööw (eds) (2002), The Cultic Milieu: Oppositional Subcultures in an Age of Globalization, Altamira Press.
