= Life stance =

Person's relation with what they accept as being of ultimate importance

A person's life stance, or lifestance, is their relation with what they accept as being of ultimate importance. It involves presuppositions and commitment to exercise it in theory and practice in one's life.

It can connote an integrated perspective on reality as a whole and how to assign valuations, thus being a concept similar or equivalent to that of a worldview; with the latter word (derived from the German Weltanschauung) being generally a more common and comprehensive term. Like the term worldview, the term life stance is a shared label encompassing both religious perspectives (for instance: "a Buddhist life stance" or "a Christian life stance" or "a Pagan life stance"), as well as non-religious spiritual or philosophical alternatives (for instance: "a humanist life stance" or "a personist life stance" or "a Deep Ecology life stance"), without discrimination in favour of any.

== Origins of the phrase ==
Humanists interested in educational matters apparently coined the neologism life stance in the mid-1970s; Harry Stopes-Roe of the Rationalist Press Association and British Humanist Association developed the concept originally in that context. The term originally arose in the context of debates over the controversial content of the City of Birmingham's Agreed Syllabus for Religious Education, 1975. That document referred to "non-religious stances for living". According to Barnes:

It was the first syllabus to abandon the aim of Christian nurture and to embrace a multi-faith, phenomenological model of religious education; and it was also the first syllabus to require a systematic study of non-religious 'stances for living', such as Humanism, and for such study to begin in the primary school.

In the late 1980s Harry Stopes-Roe initiated a successful campaign for the adoption of the term by the International Humanist and Ethical Union and by other organisations (see also his comments quoted below on its provenance). It was not an uncontroversial proposal among humanists.

The term was introduced as part of an attempt to establish a clear identity for Humanism, in order to gain recognition and respect.

According to Stopes-Roe:

"Life stance" is an expression that has been current in Britain for more than ten years and is now gaining acceptance worldwide, to describe what is good in both Humanism and religion – without being encumbered by what is bad in religion.

== Definition ==
Harry Stopes-Roe, who fought for the term's acceptance by the Humanist movement, defined "life stance" as follows:

"Life stance" - The style and content of an individual's or a community's relationship with that which is of ultimate importance; the presuppositions and commitments of this, and the consequences for living which flow from it. (Each individual or community hopes that it has come to a good and well-founded relationship, but the word is usually used without implying that this really is so).

— Harry Stopes-Roe

The British Humanist Association, drawing in part on jurisprudence related to the term "religion or belief" in the European Convention on Human Rights, has put forward a more analytical definition:

A collective belief that attains a sufficient level of cogency, seriousness, cohesion and importance and that relates the nature of life and the world to morality, values and/or the way its believers should live.

— British Humanist Association

== Orthography ==
A life stance may be distinguished from general support of a cause by capitalization of the first letter. For instance, the life stance of Humanism is distinguished from humanism generally. Many life stances may contain humanism to a greater or lesser extent as instrumental value in order to fulfill their own chosen intrinsic value(s). However, Humanism regards it as having intrinsic value.

Not all life stances use this orthography.

== Spectrum ==
The term was intended to be a shared label encompassing both religions and alternatives to religion, without discrimination in favour of either.

A life stance differs from a worldview or a belief system in that the term life stance emphasizes a focus on what is of ultimate importance. Life stance differs from eupraxsophy in that the latter typically implies a strictly non-theistic outlook, whereas a life stance can be theistic or non-theistic, supernaturalistic or naturalistic.

=== Religious life stances ===
A religion is a set of beliefs and practices, often centered upon specific supernatural and/or moral claims about reality, the cosmos, and human nature, and often codified as prayer, ritual, and law. Religion also encompasses ancestral or cultural traditions, writings, history, and mythology, as well as personal faith and mystic experience. The term "religion" refers to both the personal practices related to communal faith and to group rituals and communication stemming from shared conviction.

In the frame of European religious thought, religions present a common quality, the "hallmark of patriarchal religious thought": the division of the world in two comprehensive domains, one sacred, the other profane. Religion is often described as a communal system for the coherence of belief focusing on a system of thought, unseen being, person, or object, that is considered to be supernatural, sacred, divine, or of the highest truth. Moral codes, practices, values, institutions, tradition, philosophy, rituals, and scriptures are often traditionally associated with the core belief. Religion is also often described as a "way of life".

=== Non-religious life stances ===
Alternatives to religion include life stances based on atheism, agnosticism, deism, skepticism, freethought, pantheism, secular humanism, spiritual but not religious (SBNR), Objectivism, existentialism, modern incarnations of Hellenistic philosophies, or general secularism.

==== Humanism ====
Humanism is an example of life stance which may be considered to be religious (usually in a non-theistic, ethical sense) or non-religious or anti-religious. One of Stopes-Roe's reasons for advocating the adoption of "life stance" as a label for the Humanist movement, was his hope that it would end the arguments between the different sides as to how best to characterise their position (note that Stopes-Roe uses the term "god-religious" to distinguish theists from non-theists in what follows):

Humanists are divided into two camps... according to how they respond to the word "religion". Do they... respond negatively or positively? The ferocity of the antipathy on the one hand, and the power of the concern on the other, that is generated by this word quite obliterates reasoned discussion of many substantial and important questions on how we should develop Humanism. Likewise, our discussions with the god-religious are confused and frustrated. We need a new term for the idea and ideal of religion, opened out so that it is not discriminatory. Let this be "life stance". Could we, perhaps, bury the hatchet of "religion" and work together?

Bill Cooke comments:

Harry Stopes-Roe's contribution is significant because it makes clear humanism's value as a legitimate system of belief, without it being a pseudo-religion.

== Values and purposes ==
Different life stances differ in what they hold as intrinsic values and purposes in life.

== See also ==
- Axiology
- Intentional stance
- Lifestyle (sociology)
- Meaning of life
- Personal life
- Vocational discernment
- World view
- Basic belief
- Belief

== Bibliography ==
- Barnes, L. Philip (2008). "The 2007 Birmingham Agreed Syllabus for Religious Education: a new direction for statutory religious education in England and Wales", Journal of Beliefs & Values, Vol. 29 (1), April, pp. 75–83.
- British Humanist Association (1975). Objective, fair and balanced: a new law for religion in education. London: BHA.
- Cooke, Bill (2003). The Blasphemy Depot: a hundred years of the Rationalist Press Association. London: RPA.
- Cox, E. (1975). "Principles behind Syllabus Making", Learning for Living, Vol. 4 (4), p. 132.
- Fowler, Jeaneane D (1999). Humanism: beliefs and practices, Brighton: Sussex Academic Press.
- Greer, J.E. (1985). "Edwin Cox and Religious Education", British Journal of Religious Education, Vol. 8 (1), pp. 13–19 .
- Hull, John (1984). Studies in Religion and Education, London: Falmer.
- Kurtz, Paul et al. (ed) (1989). Building a world community: humanism in the 21st century, Prometheus Books, pp. 166–
- Slotte, Pamela (2008). "Waving the ‘Freedom of Religion or Belief’ Card, or Playing It Safe: Religious Instruction in the Cases of Norway and Finland", Religion and Human Rights Vol. 3 (1), March, pp. 33–69..
- Stopes-Roe, H[arry].V. (1976). "The concept of a 'life stance' in education." Learning for living, Vol. 16 (1), Autumn, pp. 25–28.
- Stopes-Roe, Harry (1983). "Moral Practice and Ultimate Reality", Journal of Moral Education, Vol. 12 (2), pp. 81–91.
- Stopes-Roe, Harry (1987). "Humanism as a life stance", Free Inquiry, Vol. 8 (1), Winter 1987/88, pp. 7–9, 56.
- Stopes-Roe, Harry (1988a), "Humanism as a life stance", New Humanist, Vol. 103, (2) October, pp. 19–21.
- Stopes-Roe, Harry (1988b). "Controversy: In defence of a life stance", New Humanist, Vol. 103 (4), December, pp. 8–9.
- Stopes-Roe, Harry (1996). "The Presuppositions of Dialogue: a fair vocabulary." Journal for the Critical Study of Religion, Ethics and Society, Vol. 1 (2), Summer/Fall, pp. 9–15.
- Stopes-Roe, Harry (2007). "Life stance", in Flynn, Tom (ed.). The New Encyclopedia of Unbelief. Amherst, New York: Prometheus, pp. 506–507.
- Walter, Nicolas (1988a). "Rationally speaking: against Humanism as a life stance." New Humanist, Vol. 103 (3), October, p. 4.
- Walter, Nicolas (1988b). "Rationally speaking: what kind of humanists?", New Humanist, Vol. 103 (4), December, p. 4.
