= Harry Stopes-Roe =

British philosopher and humanist activist (1924-2014)

Harry Verdon Stopes-Roe
- Born: Harry Verdon Stopes-Roe; 1924; England
- Died: 2014 (aged 89–90); London, England

Philosophical work
- Main interests: philosopher
- Notable works: humanist

Harry Verdon Stopes-Roe (27 March 1924 – 11 May 2014) was a British philosopher known mainly for his active role in the humanist movement in Britain and around the world. He was a Vice-President of the British Humanist Association until his death in May 2014, having served as its Chair previously.

== Biography ==
Born in London, he was the son of the aircraft manufacturer and philanthropist Humphrey Verdon Roe and the women's rights and family planning pioneer Marie Stopes. He started his career as a physicist, and received a BSc and MSc in physics from Imperial College, London. Thanks to studying physics he was exempt from military call-up during the Second World War. He then went to Cambridge University, and took a PhD in philosophy.

After he married a short-sighted woman, his mother, an advocate of eugenics, cut him out of her will. His wife—Mary Eyre Wallis, later Mary Stopes-Roe—was the daughter of the noted engineer Barnes Wallis. Stopes reasoned that prospective grandchildren might inherit the condition.

Stopes-Roe became a lecturer in Science Studies at Birmingham University, bringing together physics with philosophy. His work led him to seek a non-religious basis for morality in humanism, and he became Chair of the British Humanist Association as well as having an active role in the International Humanist and Ethical Union (IHEU).

In the 1970s, he was largely responsible for developing the BHA's policy on education, covering both religious and non-religious life stances. Stopes-Roe invented and popularised the term "life stance", initially in the context of debates over the controversial content of the City of Birmingham's Agreed Syllabus for Religious Education in 1975, which referred to "non-religious stances for living", as did the subsequent British Humanist Association (BHA) booklet "Objective, Fair and Balanced" which he and David Pollock produced later in the same year. In the late 1980s, he initiated a successful campaign for the adoption of the term by the IHEU and other organisations.

He represented the BHA on the Religious Education Council and he led the Values Education Council for many years. He was also president of Birmingham Humanists prior to his death. In 1986, along with Barbara Smoker, he became one of the last two Appointed Lecturers at the South Place Ethical Society, a position he retained until his death, though the Conway Hall Sunday Lectures have not been given by Appointed Lecturers for many years.

He died on 11 May 2014, at the age of 90.
