= North East Humanists =

Registered charity from the United Kingdom

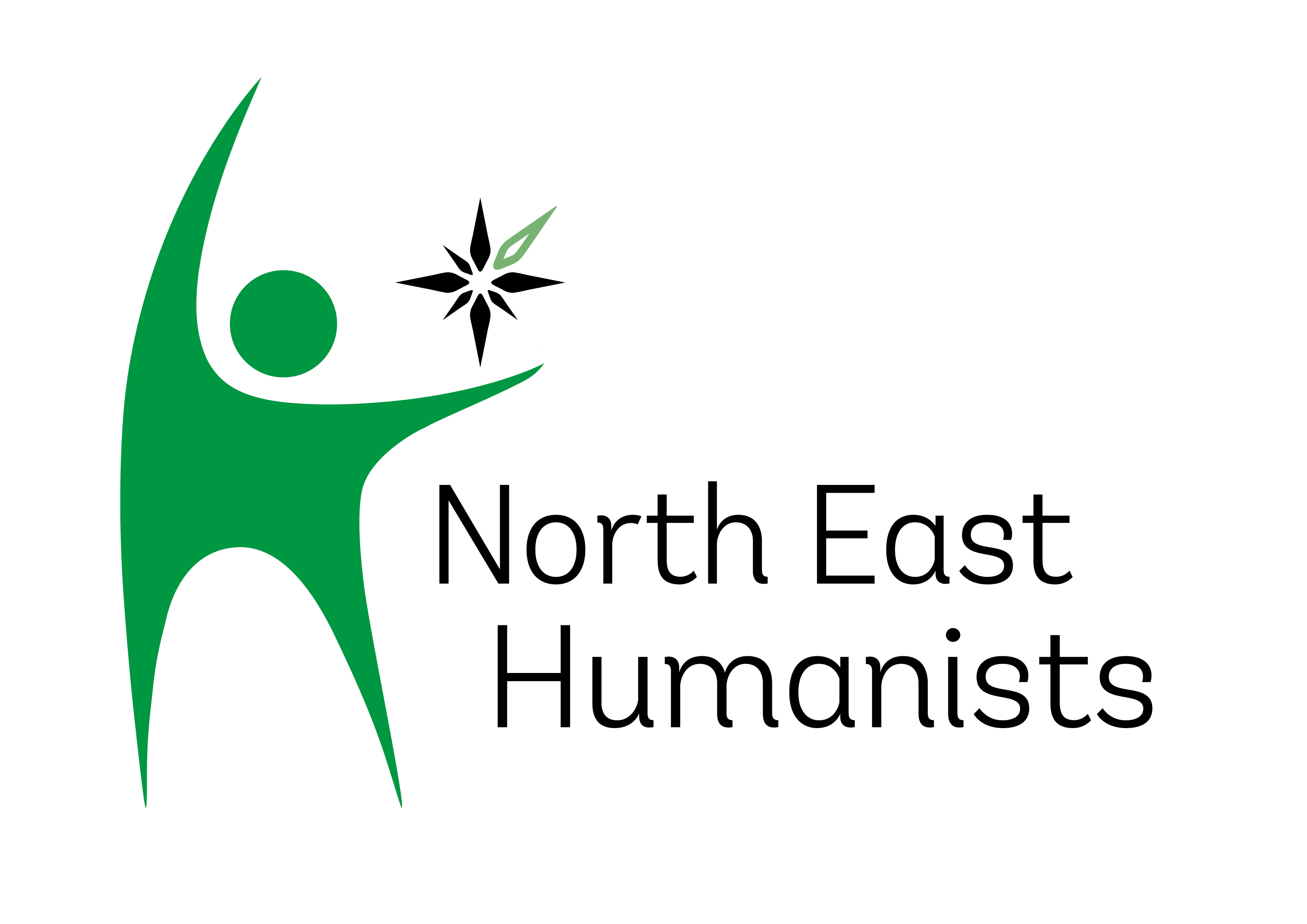
NEH logo.

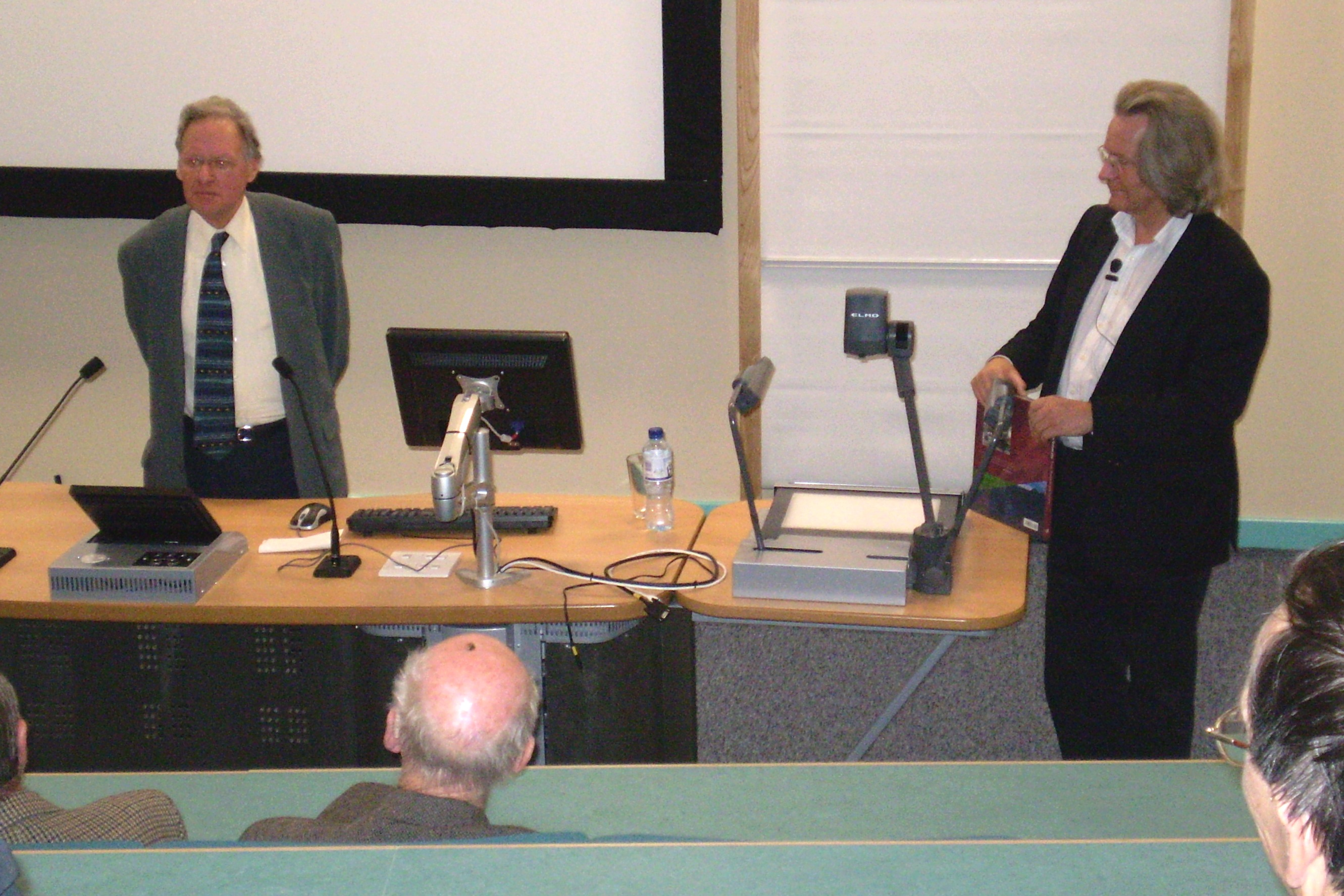
NEH Chairman Barrie Berkley introduces the philosopher A.C. Grayling at the NEH 50th anniversary lecture.

The Tyneside Group of the North East Humanists (NEH) was founded on 17 September 1957, although organised secularism in North East England had been active from the 1860s. The group adopted the name North East Humanists in 1997, after merging with the Teesside Humanist group.

NEH is a registered charity, consisting of over 200 members, and is the largest regional Humanist group in the United Kingdom. The group is involved in a wide range of activities including: working with school teachers to deliver lessons about Humanism in the RE curriculum, providing pastoral support in local hospitals and prisons, hosting events where invited speakers talk about a wide variety of topics, and numerous social events for members.

In common with the basic principles of Humanism, the NEH is concerned with values and moral issues from a non-religious viewpoint and with the achievement of a more open, just, and caring society.

To mark the 50th anniversary of the foundation of the NEH, the group held a joint lecture with Newcastle University. On 4 October 2007 A. C. Grayling gave a lecture on 'Reason and the Good', in which he explored the view (rooted in Aristotelian thinking) that reflection and choice, both expressions of the exercise of reason, are essential to the good life, underlying both the meaning we give to it and the value we find in it.

== History ==
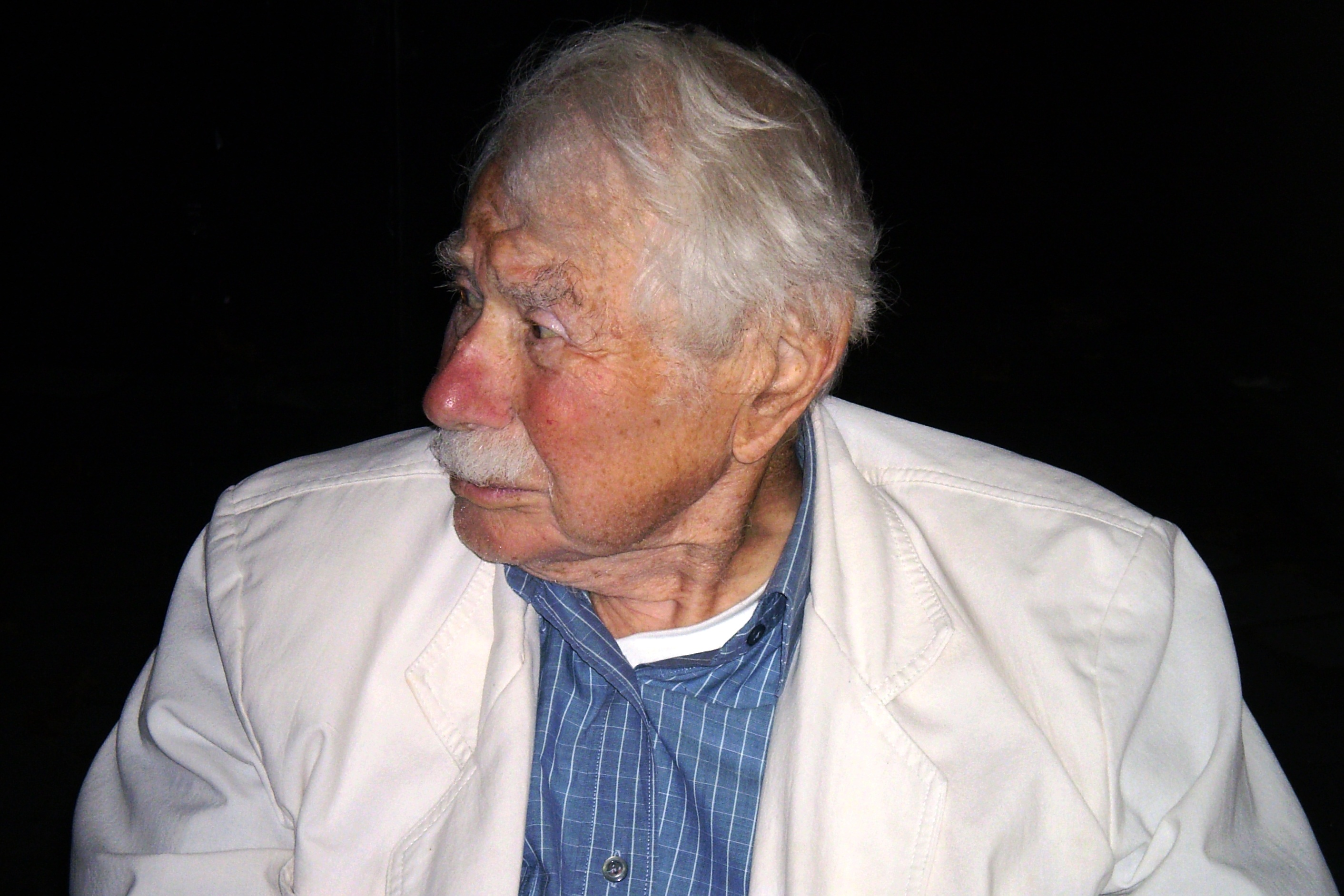
Neil Jenkins, co-author of 'Modern Humanism' and NEH President 1970–2007.

The first meeting of the Tyneside Humanist Group, later to become NEH, was attended by ten people and was held on 17 September 1957 in Kirkstone Gardens, Newcastle upon Tyne. Mr F. R. Griffin addressed the meeting about his attendance at the Second Congress of the International Humanist and Ethical Union (IHEU) in London, and he moved that the ten people present constitute the Tyneside Humanist Group. This motion was seconded by Mr J.W. Alexander and carried unanimously.

On 22 October 1957, the first of a series of ten fortnightly lectures began at Cowan House in the University of Durham, with a lecture by Mr G. Leith on Philosophy. In April 1958 it was decided to arrange a programme of speakers which would include group members. An annual membership fee of 2 shillings and 6 pence was decided upon, with regular members contributing 1 shilling a week, and a fee for visitors.

In October 1958, Mr F. R. Griffin began a series of twelve fortnightly lectures at the British Legion Social Club on the Great North Road in Newcastle upon Tyne, where meetings were held until 16 December of that year. The first annual general meeting of the group was held here in May 1959, by which point there were 21 paid-up members. In November 1959 the group agreed to send a £1 affiliation fee to the International Humanist and Ethical Union. The group began to organise various social events including theatre visits, and social evenings with games, films, prizes and gramophone record recitals.

In 1970, the Tyneside Humanist Society were holding meetings at The Friends’ Meeting House in Jesmond, Newcastle upon Tyne. Neil Jenkins was President of the group with Alfred Hobson as Chairman, and both went on to author the book Modern Humanism in 1989.

By 1993, membership of the group had increased to 60 members. At the annual general meeting of 1993, it was suggested that the group assume the title of North East Regional Humanist Association, continuing to operate as the Tyneside Group but prepared to act also as the Regional Association if requested.

In the spring of 1995, the first North East Humanist Newsletter was published. In the summer of 1995, a Teesside Humanist Group was formed as a branch of the Tyneside Group. In the autumn of 1995, a motion was carried to change the group name to North East Humanists, incorporating both the Tyneside Humanist Group and the Teesside Humanist Group. Humanism in the North East continued to expand, with the paid-up membership of the group at 114 by the beginning of 1996. By the summer of 1998, membership exceeded 150.

The first NEH regional conference was held on 12 May 2000 at Durham Castle, with Prof. David Cooper of the Durham University Philosophy Department as the keynote speaker. The group also launched a website this year.

To mark the 50th anniversary of the foundation of the NEH, the group held a joint lecture with Newcastle University. On 4 October 2007 A. C. Grayling gave a lecture on 'Reason and the Good', in which he explored the view (rooted in Aristotelian thinking) that reflection and choice, both expressions of the exercise of reason, are essential to the good life, underlying both the meaning we give to it and the value we find in it.

== Activities ==
North East Humanists hosts monthly events in Newcastle upon Tyne featuring talks and discussions on ethical and social issues with visiting speakers. The group occasionally holds one-day regional conferences on Humanist subjects. Group members receive a monthly bulletin which includes articles, a programme of events, and matters of current interest. A wide range of social events are organised for both members and non-members.

== Beliefs ==
The main beliefs of the North East Humanists are:

1. We only live once so we want to make the best of our lives. As far as we can tell, our life here is the only one we will ever have. We are part of an evolutionary process on Earth where all life is related and shares the same genetic building blocks. We see no evidence that anything supernatural affects our existence. It is up to us to give our lives purpose and to make them the best that we can for ourselves and others.
2. Our behaviour is guided by reason and empathy with concern for the welfare of all people and the entire planet. Morality is the product of our experience as evolved social animals. It is developed using natural capacities such as reason and empathy. Humanists believe that the underlying principle governing morality is a desire for the flourishing of all life.
3. Our knowledge of the world comes from experience and is aided by the sciences and humanities. Humanists ask questions and seek evidence to support their beliefs about the world. Our theories become robust in this way but must change when new information and better arguments become available.
4. We support democratic participation, secularism, and human rights. Humanists are committed to a pluralist, secular society. Whilst generally respecting the right of people to have different beliefs, Humanists will challenge ideas and practices which threaten harm to others or undermine their human rights.
5. Conflicts of interest require negotiated resolution and cooperation. Disputes at all levels, from the personal to the international, should be resolved through reasoned argument and negotiation, rather than through the use of power. We cooperate with others to address problems and reduce pain and suffering in the world.
6. Creativity and physical expression are key parts of our humanity. Humanists recognise that art, sports, practical skills, socialising, and mutual support meet innate needs in human beings. These things make our lives enjoyable and worth living. We believe that everyone deserves to have opportunities to express and experience their unique array of interests and capabilities.

== Charitable work ==
NEH became a registered charity in February 2006, their stated aims are:

- The advancement of Humanism, a non-religious ethical life-stance;
- The advancement of public knowledge about humanist values and beliefs;
- Promoting good fellowship and mutual care amongst humanists locally, regionally, nationally and internationally, fostering social interaction amongst them, and promoting social, intellectual and cultural ties between humanists and society at large;
- Promoting charitable purposes, in particular, but not exclusively, charitable causes having values compatible with Humanism.

The group has an established fund-raising committee which researches charitable causes compatible with Humanist thinking, and organises events to raise money for these charities and for the group’s own campaigns.

=== Isaac Newton High School ===
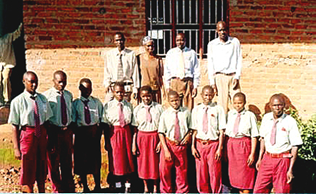
Staff and pupils at Isaac Newton High School.

The group supports the Isaac Newton High School at Kateera Village near Masaka, Uganda. The school was founded by Peter Kisirinya, a member of the Uganda Humanist Association, which is part of the worldwide International Humanist and Ethical Union. He bought land and built the first two classrooms with funds donated by his family and friends.

A major aim of the school is to help disadvantaged children who cannot afford to pay fees for secondary education. These include orphans (many of whose parents died from HIV/AIDS), children in very poor families who cannot afford to pay fees and abandoned children who can be placed in foster homes around the school and can then receive education there.

By 2006 the school had over 80 pupils, of whom only half could afford tuition fees. To facilitate the tuition of orphans and other disadvantaged children at the school, the NEH set up a fund which in 2006 raised £2880 to support 24 students for a year. The school has also received a grant of €10,000 for the construction of a science laboratory. These funds were obtained by Peter Kisirinya from IHEU, to which the NEH is affiliated, and the Humanist Institute for Development Cooperation (HIVOS). Fundraising for the school is ongoing, with money being raised through various charity events, such as quiz nights, bring and buy sales, coffee mornings, and countertop collections.

== Non-religious ceremonies ==
In recognition of the fact that those who choose to live without religion still wish to publicly mark important events in their lives, the NEH will put people in touch with accredited officiants, known as celebrants, to conduct non-religious weddings, baby namings, same sex affirmations, and funerals.

== See also ==
- British Humanist Association
