= Growing Up (1971 film) =

1971 British education film by Dr Martin Cole

- Directed by: Dr Martin Cole
- Produced by: Arnold Louis Miller
- Narrated by: Dr Martin Cole
- Production companies: Global Films; In association with The Institute for Sex Education and Research
- Release date: 1971
- Running time: 23 minutes
- Country: United Kingdom
- Language: English

Growing Up is a 23-minute sex education documentary film for schools directed and narrated by Dr Martin Cole. It was first shown in April 1971.

== Controversy ==
At the time of its release it was said to be "the most explicit and frank film ever made for use in schools", and attracted condemnation by Mary Whitehouse, Lord Longford, Margaret Thatcher and members of the Women's Liberation Movement who all, excepting Thatcher, attended the first public screening. Made two years before its earliest public showing, Cole though soon regretted a traditionalist description of gender roles in the film's opening commentary.

The function of women was described as "giving birth to children", while it claimed men were "better at giving birth to ideas", a sequence which the Women's Liberation Movement objected to. There was a version of the film shown to Aston University students earlier for feedback prior to the final version being released.

It features scenes rather than drawings of naked people of various ages, which included unsimulated erections, intercourse and masturbation, though not to orgasm and not showing explicit insertion and penetration during intercourse, except as an X-ray-style diagram of the sex organs superimposed on a closeup of the demonstrators' bodies during the act. Teachers and pupils gave it positive feedback, but the absence of a discussion of venereal disease (VD) was noted by sympathetic reviewers.

The film triggered a national controversy; "Educationally speaking, it is a rotten film", Whitehouse said after viewing the film, "which makes children no more than animals." Margaret Thatcher, then secretary of state for education who had sent an advisor to view the film, told the House of Commons on 21 April that she was "very perturbed" at the thought of the film being shown in schools and suggested local education authorities consider it "with extreme caution".

After insisting on a screening, the education authority in Birmingham, where Cole lived, banned the film from being shown in the city's schools. There is no record of the film being shown to school children anywhere by the end of 1971, although it was shown to students at Oxford University.

In 1976 the film was shown to pupils at Milham Ford Girls' School, Oxford with the support of the then headmistress and the majority of the governors. A number of parents and pupils subsequently raised concerns with the National Viewers and Listeners Association.

== Reception ==
In a contemporary review David McGillivray wrote in The Monthly Film Bulletin:

"At the time of going to press, the fate of Growing Up remains in the balance. It has been condemned by Mary Whitehouse and the Archbishop of Canterbury, and a decision is awaited from the Director of Public Prosecutions. ...

The film's director Dr. Martin Cole (a lecturer in genetics at Aston University) has admitted that "What we wanted to do was make a sexy film", and indeed, comparisons with 'sexploitation' in the commercial cinema are inescapable: the attendant literature promises unsimulated masturbation and intercourse, and the National Press has gleefully reported every sensational repercussion of the original press show. Basically, the film's "new approach" consists of an explicit study of physical and mental developments, for the benefit of (hopefully well-adjusted) ten to fifteen-year-olds. ...

The film is a series of lantern slides attempting to dramatize, punctuated by static shots of crowds around the Regent Street area. Dr. Cole's shots are of lady traffic wardens given as an example of women's struggle against inferiority; the onset of puberty is illustrated by two fully-grown adults masturbating. ...

But one should perhaps bear in mind that this is the only completed film in a projected series. Having concentrated on the processes of growing up it actually covers relatively few aspects of sexuality an only has time for a brief snatch of advice towards the end about using contraceptives as soon as possible in order to avoid unwanted babies."

== Home media ==
It is available as part of The Joy of Sex Education DVD and was described by one critic as "the most famous and controversial inclusion", and by Peter Bradshaw of The Guardian as the "undoubted masterpiece of this double-DVD set".
