= Martin Cole (sexologist) =

British sexologist (1931–2015)

- Born: Martin John Cole; 4 October 1931
- Died: 2 June 2015 (aged 83)
- Education: Southampton University
- Occupation: Sexologist

Martin John Cole (4 October 1931 – 2 June 2015) was a British sexologist, sex education advocate and campaigner for abortion law reform, dubbed "Sex King Cole" by The Sun newspaper for his work in this field.

== Life ==
Cole was born in London in 1931. He read Botany at Southampton University for a BSc and gained a PhD in Plant Genetics. After a period in Africa, in 1964 he took up the post of lecturer in Genetics at the College of Advanced Technology which became Aston University. In 1984 he left the university, to work full-time at the Institute for Sex Education and Research which he had established. He was married and divorced three times and had five children who survived him.

He died 2 June 2015 aged 83.

== Work ==
Apart from his academic work in genetics, he was Chairman of the Birmingham Group of the Abortion Law Reform Association and involved in the setting up of clinics for advice on sexual matters, contraception and abortion. Following the Abortion Act 1967 he was a founder of the Birmingham Pregnancy Advisory Service (which later became the British Pregnancy Advisory Service) which assisted women to get legal abortions, initially using the front room of his home for consultations in 1968. He also set up an Institute of Sex Education and Research in 1966 which included the use of female therapists acting as surrogate partners to treat men with erectile dysfunction. In 1972, Jill Knight, the Conservative MP for Birmingham Edgbaston, accused him of running a brothel.

In 1971 he placed into the public domain what was then said to be "the most explicit and frank film ever made for use in schools", a thirty-minute sex education film called Growing Up which had been made two years earlier. It was condemned by Mary Whitehouse, Lord Longford and Margaret Thatcher. Conservative MP Elaine Kellett-Bowman, then known as Elaine Kellett, walked out of the screening exclaiming: "I would shoot that man", meaning Cole. The same year his book Fundamentals of Sex was published. The work caused particular comment at the time because it contained explicit photographs.

By 1993 though, the Institute of Sex Education and Research had only two therapists still working there from a peak of ten; Cole's approach to resolving sexually problems had been affected by the onset of AIDS.

== See also ==
- Calthorpe Clinic
